= List of viceroys of Portugal =

Viceroy of Portugal
- Residence: Ribeira Palace
- Appointer: King of Portugal
- Formation: 18 July 1580
- First holder: Duke of Alba
- Final holder: Duchess of Mantua
- Abolished: 1 December 1640

The Viceroy of Portugal was the political chief of the Kingdom of Portugal and the highest representative of the King of Portugal during the period of the Iberian Union, when a personal union existed between the monarchies of Portugal and Spain.

== History ==
According to what was established in the Cortes of Tomar in 1581, the regency of the Kingdom of Portugal always had to be trusted by the king to a Portuguese, or in alternative to a member of the Royal Family. This was, in a general way, fulfilled, having during two periods the regency been trusted to a governmental council called Government Junta of the Kingdom of Portugal.

== List ==
Picture	Viceroy	From	Until	Monarch
	Fernando Álvarez de Toledo, 3rd Duke of Alba	18 July 1580	11 December 1582	Philip I of Portugal
	Albert VII, Archduke of Austria	11 February 1583	5 July 1593	Philip I of Portugal
	1st Regency Council; Presided by Miguel de Castro, Archbishop of Lisbon; João da Silva, 4th Count of Portalegre; Francisco de Mascarenhas, 1st Count of Santa Cruz; Duarte de Castelo Branco, 1st Count of Sabugal; Miguel de Moura	5 July 1593	1598	Philip I of Portugal
	Francisco Gómez de Sandoval, 1st Duke of Lerma	1598	29 January 1600	Philip II of Portugal
	Cristóvão de Moura, 1st Marquis of Castelo Rodrigo	29 January 1600	1603	Philip II of Portugal
	Afonso de Castelo Branco, Bishop-Count of Coimbra	1603	24 May 1605	Philip II of Portugal
	Pedro de Castilho, Bishop of Leiria	24 May 1605	February 1608	Philip II of Portugal
	Cristóvão de Moura, 1st Marquis of Castelo Rodrigo	February 1608	1612	Philip II of Portugal
	Pedro de Castilho, Bishop of Leiria	February 1612	1612	Philip II of Portugal
	Aleixo de Menezes, Archbishop-Primate of Braga	1612	1615	Philip II of Portugal
	Miguel de Castro, Archbishop of Lisbon	1615	10 May 1619	
	Diego de Silva y Mendoza, 1st Marquis of Alenquer	10 May 1619	1 September 1621	
	2nd Regency Council; Presided by Martim Afonso Mexia, Bishop-Count of Coimbra; Diogo de Castro, 2nd Count of Basto; Nuno Álvares Pereira Colón de Portugal, 3rd Duke of Veragua	1 September 1621	30 August 1623	Philip III of Portugal
	3rd Regency Council; Presided by Diogo de Castro, 2nd Count of Basto; Afonso Furtado de Mendonça, Archbishop of Lisbon; Diogo da Silva, 5th Count of Portalegre	30 August 1623	1631	Philip III of Portugal
	4th Regency Council; Presided by António de Ataíde, 5th Count of Castanheira; Nuno de Mendonça, 1st Count of Vale de Reis	1631	March 1632	Philip III of Portugal
	António de Ataíde, 5th Count of Castanheira	March 1632	12 May 1633	Philip III of Portugal
	João Manuel de Ataíde, Archbishop of Lisbon	12 May 1633	4 July 1633	Philip III of Portugal
	Diogo de Castro, 2nd Count of Basto	4 July 1633	23 December 1634	Philip III of Portugal
	Margaret of Savoy, Duchess of Mantua	23 December 1634	1 December 1640	Philip III of Portugal

== See also ==
- Iberian Union
- Council of Portugal

== Sources ==
- October 2009+05:53:11 Virreinato de Portugal
