= Pedro de Castilho =

- Bishop of Leiria
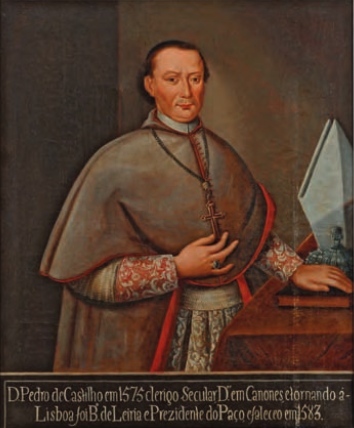
- Pedro de Castilho from the collection of portraits of Bishops of Angra
- Church: Catholic Church
- Diocese: Diocese of Leiria
- In office: 3 June 1583 – 1605
- Predecessor: António Pinheiro
- Successor: Martin Alphonso Mexia de Tovar
- Previous post: Bishop of Angra (1578-1583)

Personal details
- Born: Coimbra, Kingdom of Portugal and the Algarves
- Died: 31 March 1615 Coimbra, Kingdom of Portugal, Iberian Union

Pedro de Castilho (Coimbra, c. 1540 — Lisbon, 31 March 1615) was a Portuguese Bishop and Viceroy in the service of King Philip II and Philip III of Spain.

== Biography ==
He was the son of the architect João de Castilho and María Fernandes de Quintanilha.
Pedro Castilho studied literature at the Faculty of Arts of the University of Coimbra, which he completed in 1562. Shortly afterward, he began studying Theology, obtaining a Bachelor's degree in Canon Law in 1568 and a Licentiate in 1572. Upon graduating from university, he was appointed prior of the church of San Salvador de Ílhavo and beneficiary of the parish of San Andrés de Celorico. On 16 February 1575, he was made a deputy of the Holy Office of Coimbra thanks to the intercession of Cardinal-Infante Henry of Portugal.

In 1577, he departed for the Azores to assume the Bishopric of Angra, replacing the deceased Gaspar de Faria. During his time in the Azores, he defended the interests of Philip II against the supporters of António, Prior of Crato, later transferring to the island of São Miguel, where he founded the São José neighborhood in the city of Ponta Delgada. He remained in this see until 1582, when he was transferred to the Diocese of Leiria.

On 23 August 1604, he was made Grand Inquisitor of Portugal, and on 1 January 1605, Viceroy of Portugal. He held this position until 3 January 1608, when he was succeeded by Cristóvão de Moura, whom he again replaced in 1612, taking his oath on 18 February. This second time, he remained in office only for a few months, until Friar Aleixo de Menezes was appointed Viceroy of Portugal.
Pedro de Castilho died in 1615 or 1616.

Catholic Church titles
Preceded by Gaspar de Faria	Bishop of Angra; 1578 – 1583	Succeeded by Manuel de Gouveia
Preceded by António Pinheiro	Bishop of Leiria-Fátima; 1583 – 1604	Succeeded by Martim Afonso Mexia
Preceded by Alexandre de Bragança	Grand Inquisitor of Portugal; 1604–1615	Succeeded by Fernando Martins Mascarenhas
Government offices
Preceded by Afonso de Castelo-Branco	Viceroy of Portugal; 1605–1608	Succeeded by Cristóvão de Moura
Preceded by Cristóvão de Moura	Viceroy of Portugal; 1612–1612	Succeeded by Aleixo de Menezes
