= Missal of the Academy of Sciences =

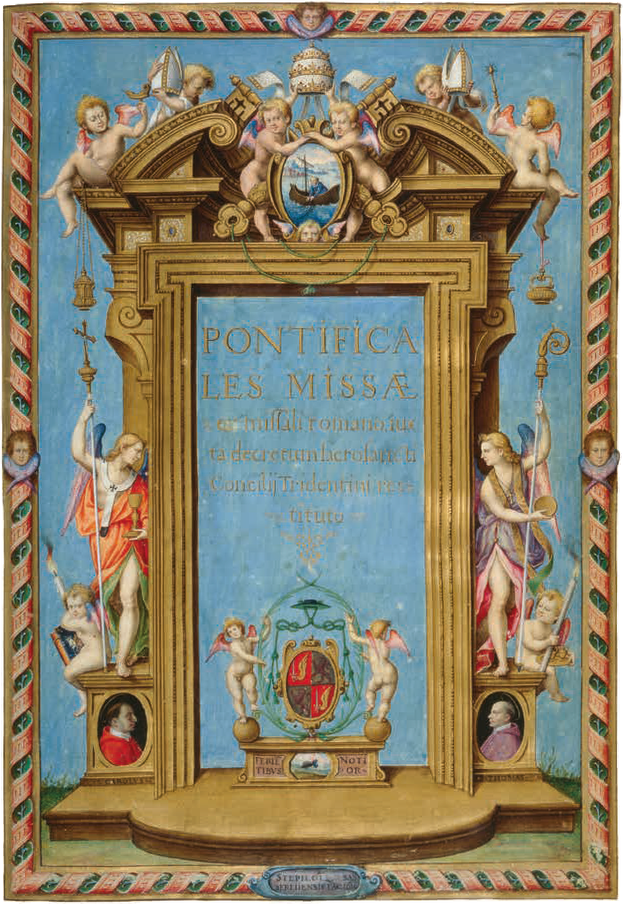
- Frontispiece, signed "STEPH. GL̃Z. ABBAS SEREIIENSIS FAC. 1616"
- Original title: Pontificales Missæ ex Missali Romano, Iuxta Decretum Sacrosancti Concilii Tridentini Restituto
- Illustrator: Estêvão Gonçalves Neto
- Subject: Roman Pontifical
- Publication date: c. 1622
- Publication place: Portugal
- Pages: 44, recto-verso

The Missal of the Academy of Sciences (Portuguese: Missal da Academia das Ciências) is a notable Portuguese 17th-century Roman Pontifical codex, profusely illuminated by Estêvão Gonçalves Neto.

Originally commissioned for João Manuel de Ataíde, at the time Bishop of Viseu, its iconographic programme reflects the ideas of the Counter-Reformation. Bishop Ataíde had it deposited in the library of the Convent of Our Lady of Jesus in Lisbon and, since 1834, it has belonged to the collection of the Lisbon Academy of Sciences.

It is widely considered the finest specimen of Portuguese miniature, and has been called by historian Joaquim Veríssimo Serrão a "veritable masterpiece of the national genius".

== History ==
The work can be dated to c. 1616-1622, based on the several signatures that feature on the most important miniatures in the codex. Not much information about Estêvão Gonçalves Neto, the author of the illuminated missal, is available; however, it is known that he was, around 1610, chaplain to the Bishop of Viseu, João Manuel de Ataíde, only to become later Abbot of Cerejo, in Pinhel, near Guarda (1613–1618), and, later still, became a canon of the Viseu Cathedral on 8 October 1622. Whenever his signatures on the Missal do not feature a date, they invariably feature his ecclesiastical office at the time (from "STEPH. GL̃Z. ABBAS SEREIIENSIS" to "STE. CANON. VISEN"), which allows to date them with some degree of certainty.

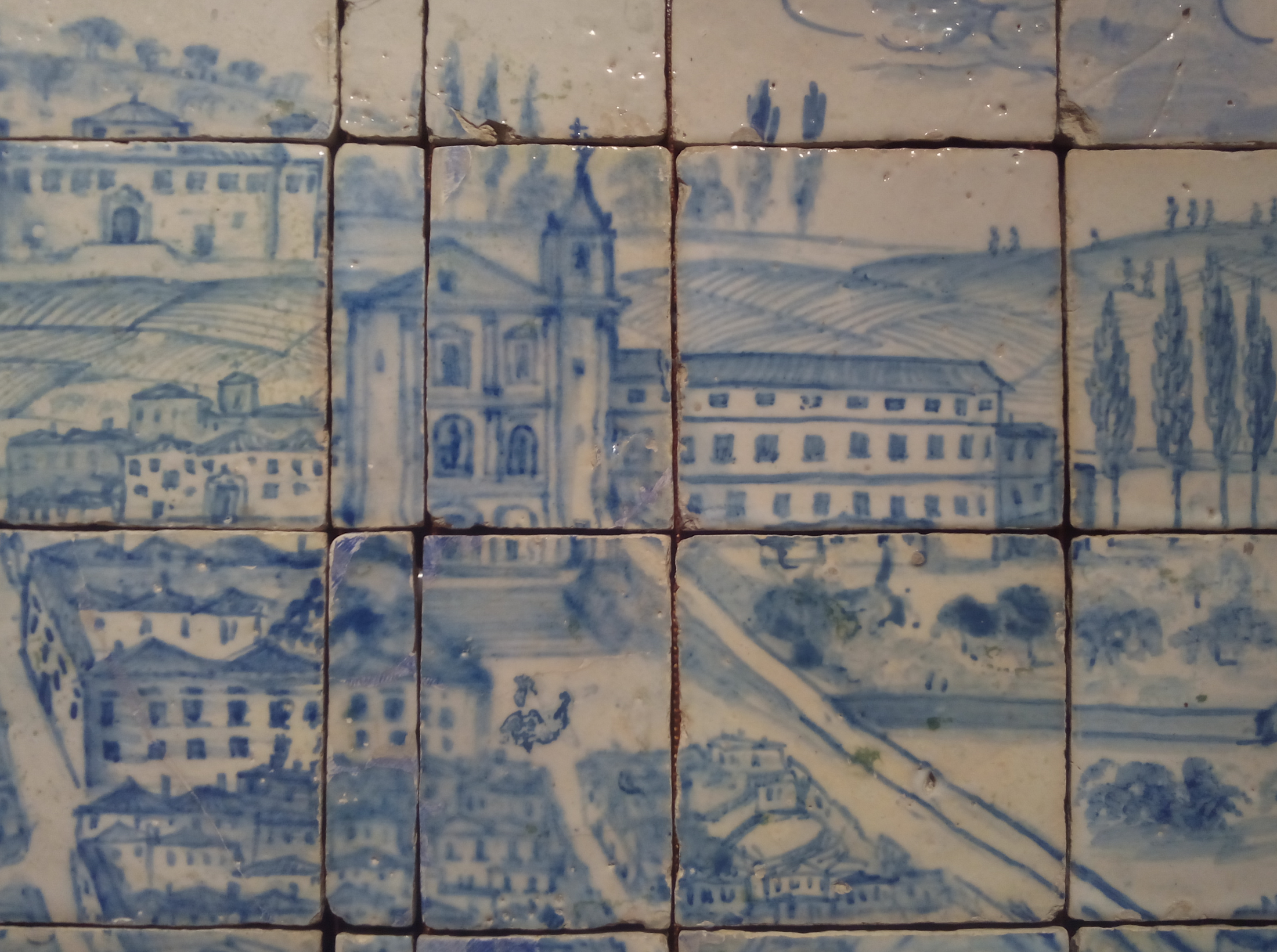
The Convent of Jesus, as it appeared in the early 18th century (Great Panorama of Lisbon, Gabriel del Barco, National Azulejo Museum)

The codex was originally presented by Gonçalves Neto to Bishop Ataíde, whose coat of arms — that of the powerful Manuel family, Counts of Atalaia, under a bishop's green galero with six tassels on each side — features prominently on the frontispiece. At some point, the bishop had the book deposited in the library of the Convent of Our Lady of Jesus in Lisbon, of his founding and patronage.

Following the dissolution of the monasteries and the nationalisation of their assets in 1834, the convent became the seat of the Lisbon Academy of Sciences; the Missal, along with the rest of the books in the library of the convent, became the property of the Academy of Sciences, and remains to this day in the library of the former convent.

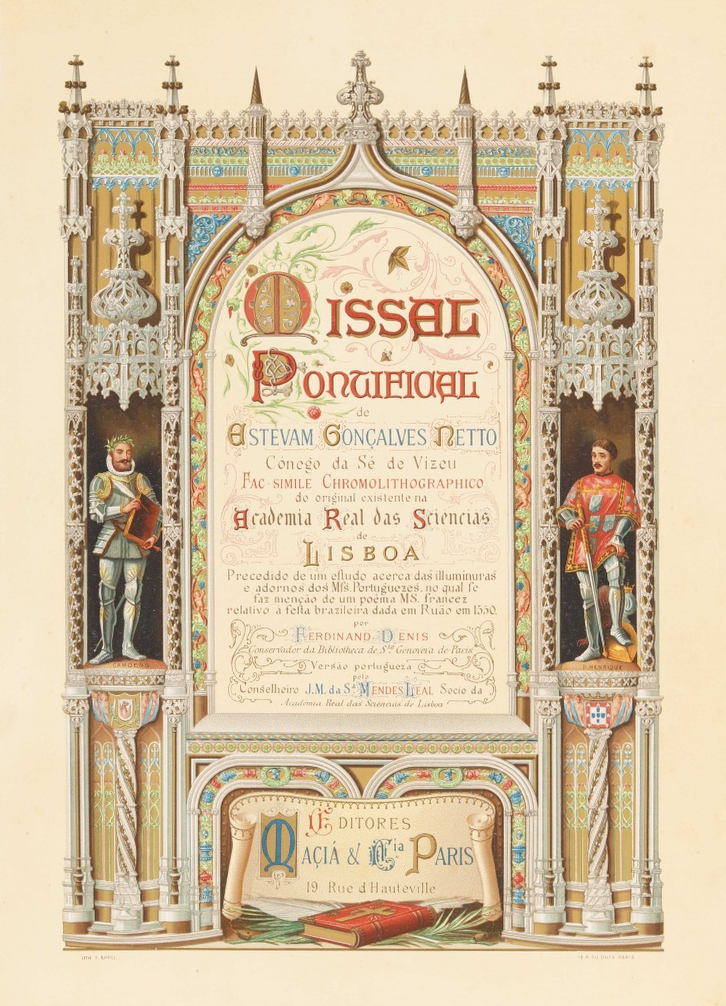
Frontispiece of the chromolithographic facsimile published in 1879 by Maciá & Cie.

The Missal seems to have resurfaced in the 19th century, and is briefly referenced in some works about Portuguese art, such as Almeida Garrett's essay that accompanies his libertine poem O Retrato de Vénus (1821), Cirilo Volkmar Machado's Colecção de Memórias (1823), Francisco de São Luís Saraiva's Lista de Alguns Artistas Portugueses (1839), and Atanazy Raczyński's Les Arts en Portugal (1846). However, it was only following the International Exposition of 1867, when it was exhibited in Paris, that it rose to greater prominence: it caused such sensation that a faithful chromolithographic facsimile was soon after published by popular demand, following a public subscription that included nearly all the crowned heads and art academies in Europe. This facsimile, published by the Parisian firm Maciá & Cie. on behalf of the Portuguese government and with the approval of the vice-president of the Academy of Sciences, the Marquis of Ávila and Bolama, was dedicated to Ferdinand II of Portugal, himself a noted artist and connoisseur.

The Missal last left the confines of the Academy of Sciences in 2016 for a monographic exhibition on Estêvão Gonçalves Neto in the National Museum of Ancient Art, "Estêvão Gonçalves Neto: The Last Illuminator"; Artur Anselmo, President of the Academy, has since made public the decision not to lend the Missal for exhibitions again, owing to its great value.

== Description ==
The codex is composed of 44 parchment leaves, in folio size. It is bound in crimson velvet with silver clasps.

It is ornamented throughout, and it includes eleven large plates drawn in pen and fully coloured, these are the frontispiece, The Adoration of the Shepherds (fl. 3v.), The Wise Men of the East (fl. 5v.), The Last Supper (fl. 7v.), Calvary (fl. 20v.), The Resurrection (fl. 28v.), Descent of the Holy Ghost (fl. 30v.), The Assumption (fl. 30v.), a Catafalque for a Requiem Mass (fl. 34), Christ Disputing with the Doctors (fl. 40v.), Our Lady Receiving the Child Jesus from Saint Francis of Assisi (fl. 42v.) — the authorship of the last three is unknown, since they are not signed and show some important but subtle stylistic differences to Estêvão Gonçalves Neto's work. The pictures aside, there are numerous vignettes and capital letters in fanciful decoration.

=== Frontispiece ===
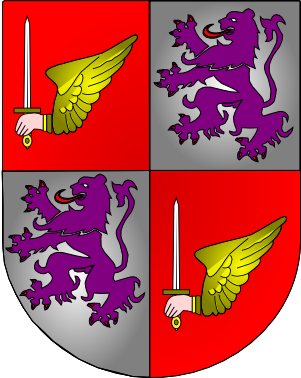
Coat of arms of the Manuel family: Quarterly, 1. and 4. Gules a winged arm or holding a sword, 2. and 3. Argent a lion rampant purpure.

The frontispiece comprises a symmetrical composition surrounded by a trompe-l'oeil frame resembling a ribbon draped around a plant stem. A portal, seemingly gilt wood with precious stones inlaid, topped by architecturally elaborate entablature and a broken pediment ending in volutes, has in the place of its tympanum, an elyptical medallion supported by three angels, over the crossed Keys of Heaven and under a papal tiara; it depicts Saint Peter casting his fishing net on the Sea of Galilee. Underneath the book's title, framed by the portal ("Pontificales Missæ ex Missali Romano, Iuxta Decretum Sacrosancti Concilii Tridentini Restituto"), are the coat of arms of the Manuel family, Counts of Atalaia, with the external ornaments befitting a bishop (a green galero with six tassels hanging on each side): the coat of arms of João Manuel de Ataíde as Bishop of Viseu. The achievement of arms is surrounded by two palm branches, tied together at the bottom by a blood-soaked piece of white cloth. Underneath it, a medallion depicting a sea creature (possibly a cetacean) accompanies the book's Latin inscriptio: "FERIENTIBUS NOTIOR". Beneath it all, over the lower margin of the fanciful vegetalist frame, the illuminator's signature "STEPH. GL̃Z. ABBAS SEREIIENSIS FAC. 1616". On either side of the portal are two medallions, each with the profile of a male figure of a saint: "S. CAROLVS" to the left (Saint Charles Borromeo) and "S. THOMAS" to the right (misidentified by older authors as Saint Thomas of Villanova or Saint Thomas Aquinas — it is actually Saint Thomas Becket, as denounced by the trickle of blood on the saint's head). On either side of the architectonic composition, eight angels hold episcopal vestments and liturgical objects: two large angels stand in the place of caryatids (the one to the left holds a large crucifix and a chalice and wears a pallium, the one on the right holds a crosier and a paten and wears a stole and a pectoral cross), two smaller angels sit at the former's feet (the one on the left holds a missal and a candle, the one on the right holds a cruet and a candle), and, at the top, two pairs of small angels hold, to the right, an archbishop's mitre, a situla and an aspergillum; the ones on the left hold a bishop's mitre, a navicula, and a thurible.

== Plates ==
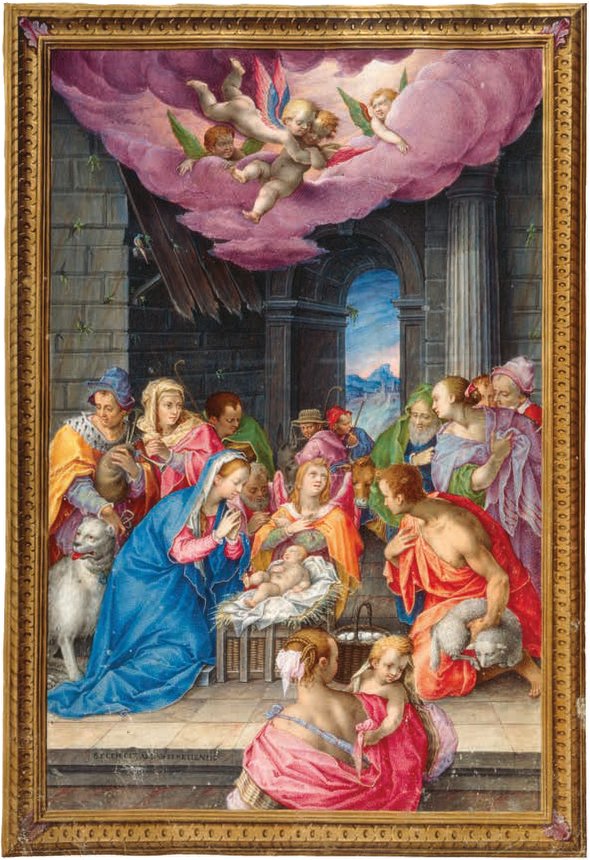
The Adoration of the Shepherds (fl. 3v.), 1616-18

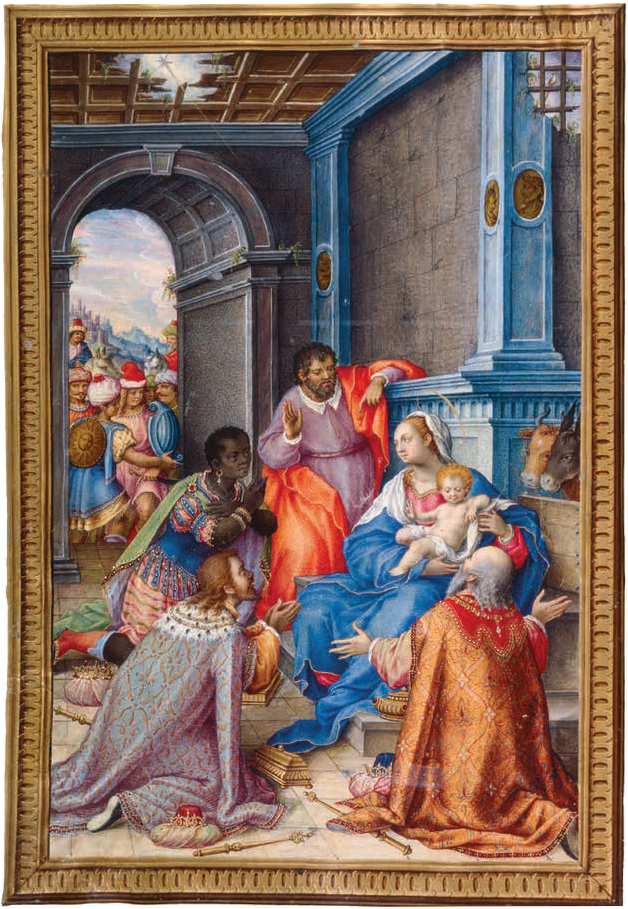
The Adoration of the Magi (fl. 5v.), 1616-22

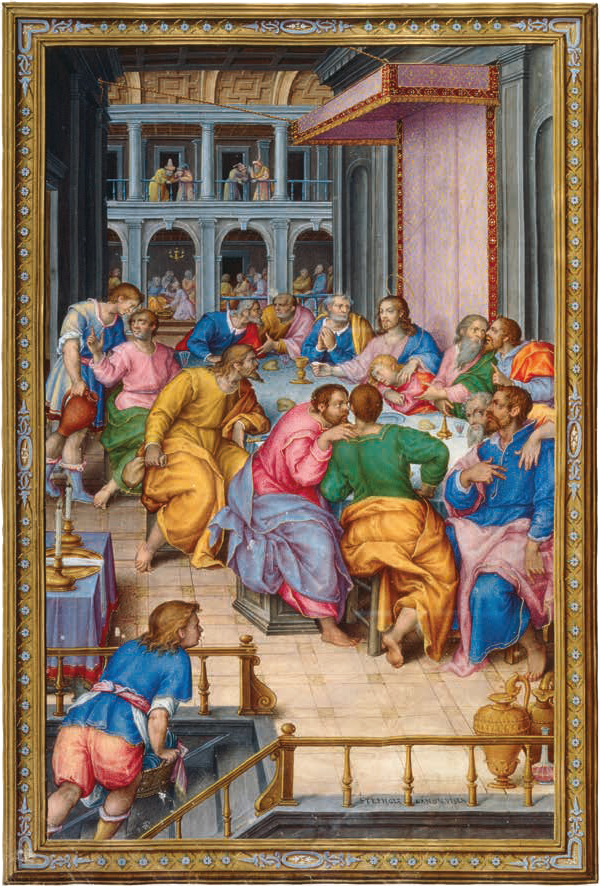
The Last Supper (fl. 7v.), c. 1622

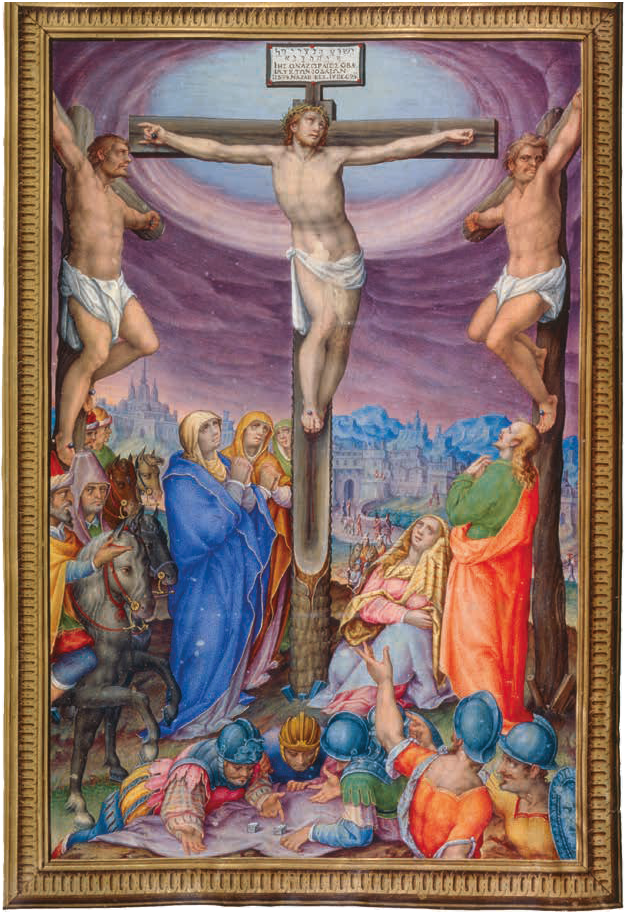
The Crucifixion (fl. 20v.), 1616-22

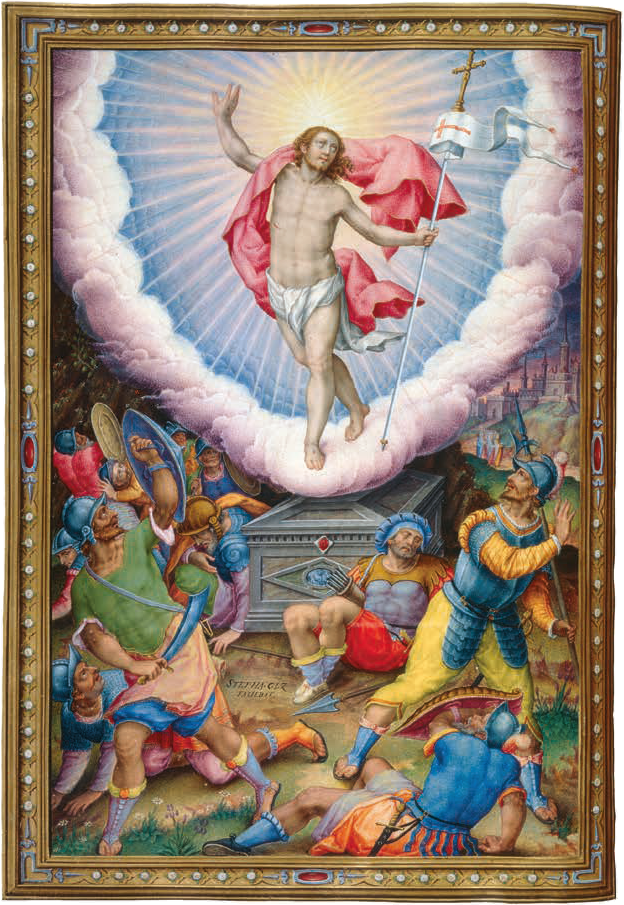
The Resurrection (fl. 28v.), 1616-22

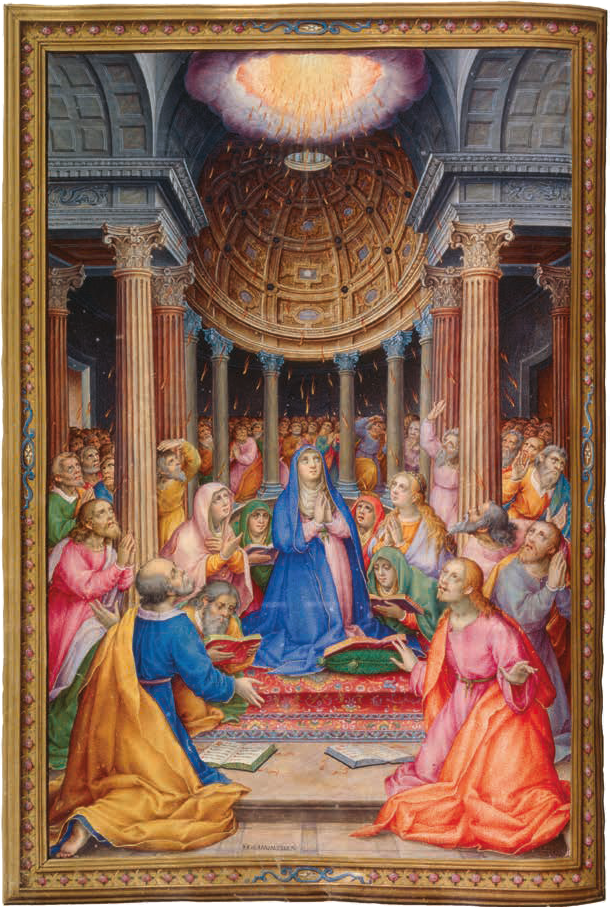
Pentecost (fl. 30v.), c. 1622

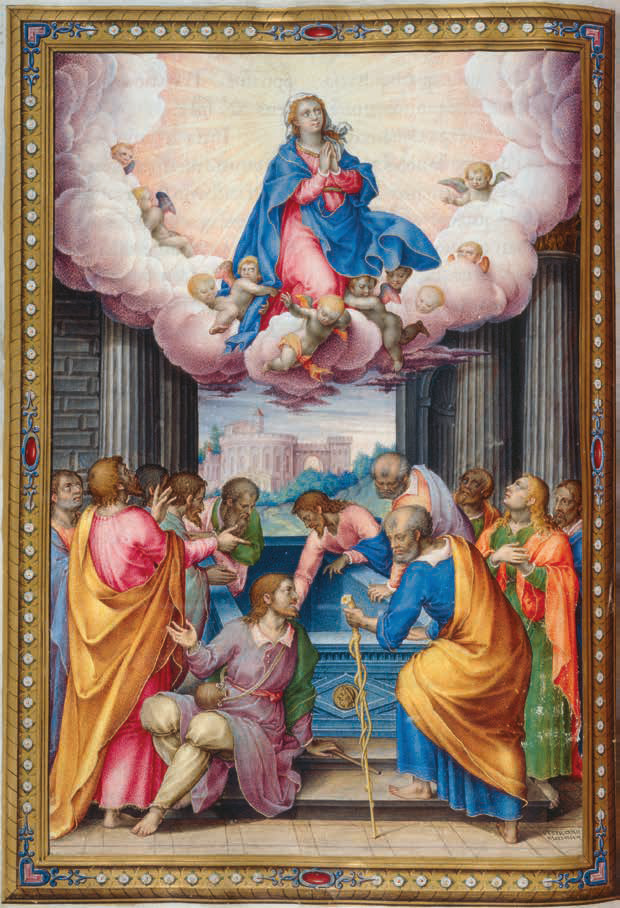
Assumption of Mary (fl. 30v.), c. 1622

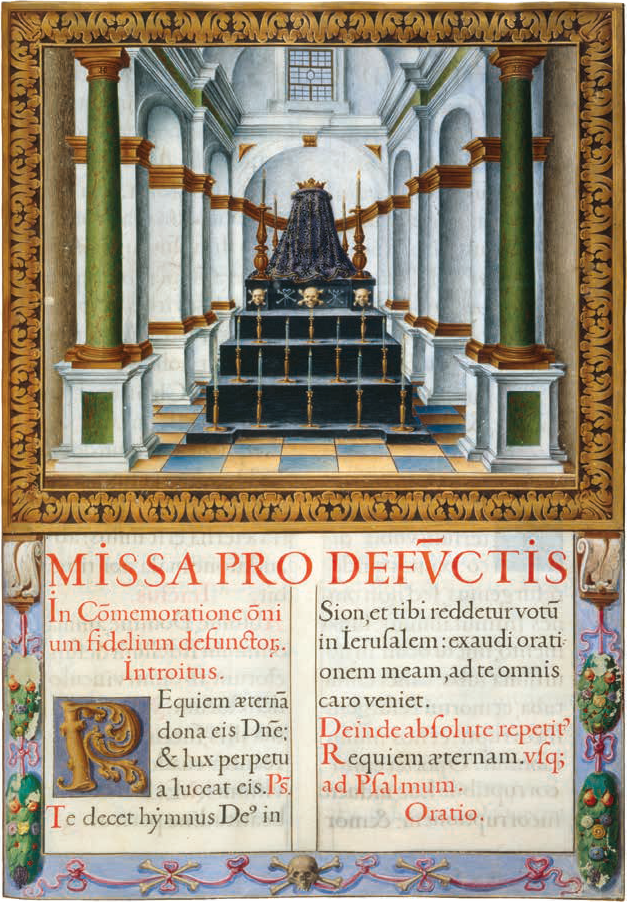
Catafalque (fl. 34), post-1622 (unsigned)

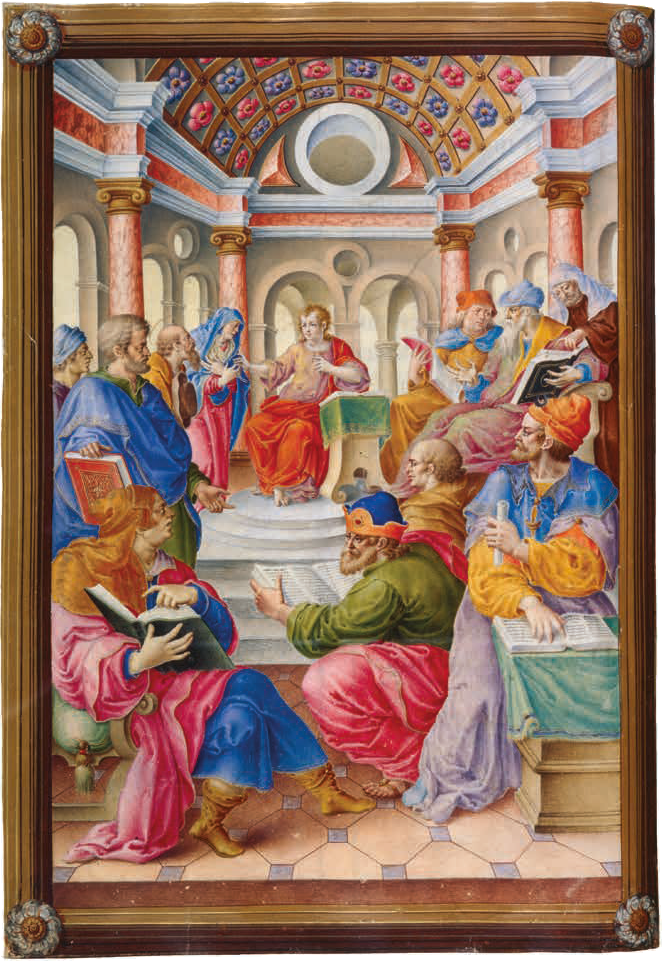
Jesus among the Doctors (fl. 40v.), post-1622 (unsigned)

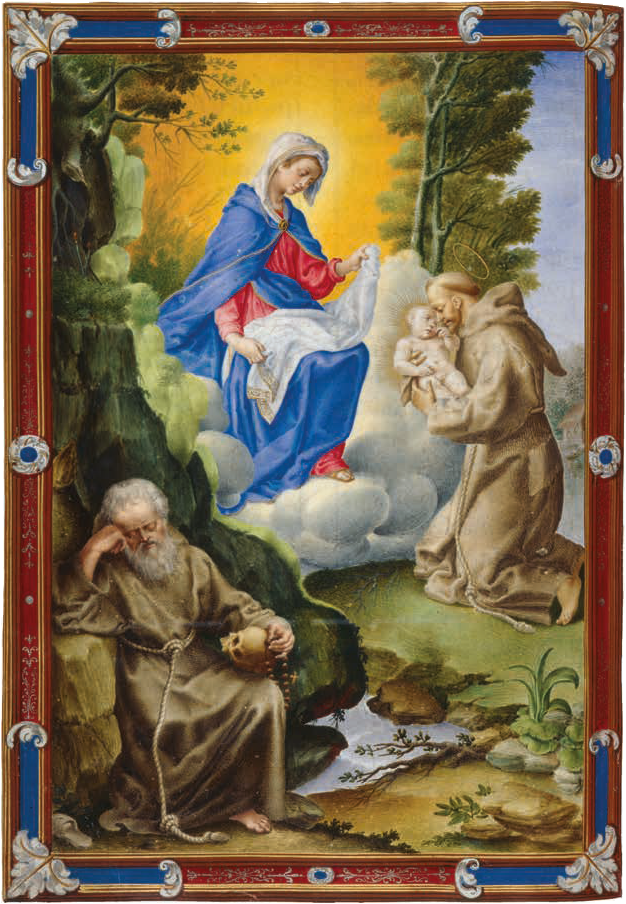
The Virgin offers the Baby Jesus to Saint Francis of Assisi (fl. 42v.), post-1622 (unsigned)
