= Estêvão Gonçalves Neto =

Portuguese priest and artist (d. 1627)

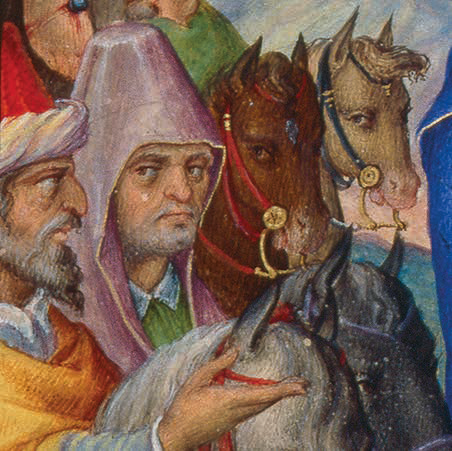
- Possible self-portrait as Joseph of Arimathea, in a detail from the Crucifixion (Missal of the Academy of Sciences, c. 1616-1622)
- Died: 29 July 1627; Viseu, Portugal
- Notable work: Missal of the Academy of Sciences
- Patrons: João Manuel de Ataíde

Estêvão Gonçalves Neto (d. 29 July 1627) was a Portuguese priest who became a notable illuminator and miniature artist. His work has been compared to that of Federico Barocci and Taddeo Zuccari.

== Early life ==
Little information is available about his early life and familial background. Historians speculate that he could be a descendant of Lord of Alba de Yeltes, who fled to Portugal to escape persecution by Isabella I of Castile due to his support of Joanna la Beltraneja's claim to the throne of Castile.

== Career ==
He was chaplain to the Bishop of Viseu, João Manuel de Ataíde, who made him a canon of his cathedral on 8 October 1622, following the death of canon Cristóvão de Mesquita. From some of his miniatures signed "Abbas Sereiiensis", he seems to have been previously abbot of Cerejo, in Pinhel, near Guarda (though some older authors erroneously interpret this as Serém, a place in Macinhata do Vouga, Águeda).

His masterpiece, a profusely illustrated Roman Pontifical made from 1616 to 1622 is part of the collection of the Lisbon Academy of Sciences. It is regarded as one of the best examples of Portuguese illumination.
