= Jerónimo Osório =

18th-century Portuguese prelate and historian (1506–1580)

His Lordship D. Jerónimo Osório
- Bishop of the Algarve
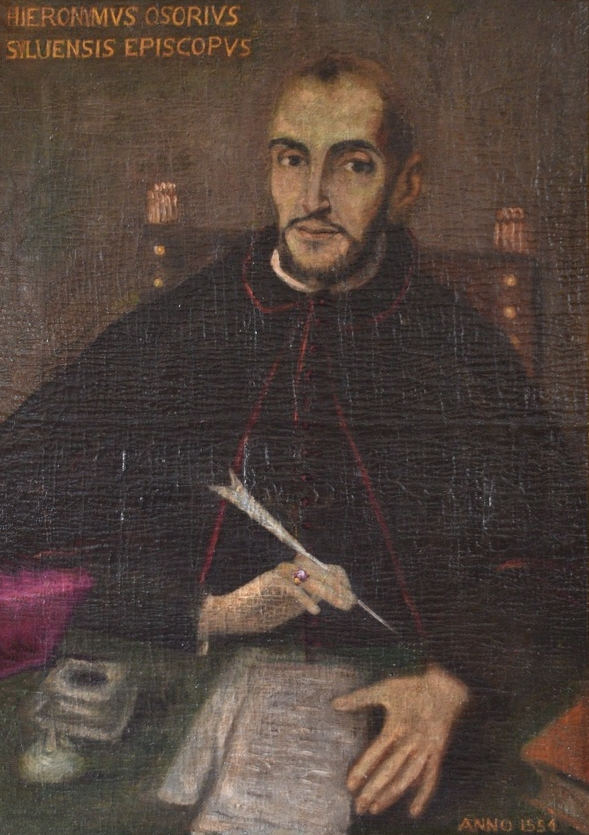
- Church: Roman Catholic Church
- Diocese: Archdiocese of Faro
- Appointed: 21 June 1564
- Term ended: 20 August 1580
- Predecessor: João de Melo
- Successor: Afonso de Castelo Branco

Orders
- Consecration: 22 October 1564 by Julião de Alva

Personal details
- Born: Jerónimo Osório da Fonseca; 1506 Lisbon, Portugal
- Died: 20 August 1580 (aged 73–74) Tavira, Portugal

Styles of Jerónimo Osório
- Reference style: His Lordship
- Spoken style: Your Lordship

D. Jerónimo Osório da Fonseca (1506 – 20 August 1580) was a Portuguese Roman Catholic humanist bishop, historian and polemicist. An extensive notice of his life and thought (Vita) was written by his nephew, a canon of Évora also named Jerónimo Osório, to introduce his edition of his uncle's Complete Works (dedicated to King Philip I of Portugal) published in 1592.

== Life ==
=== Young life and education ===
Osório was a native of Lisbon and one of two sons of João Osório de Fonseca, and Francisca, daughter of Affonso Gil de Gouveia, Ouvidor of the lands of the Infante Ferdinand, both families of aristocratic lineage. His father, appointed by John III to be Ouvidor Geral (Auditor-General) of Portuguese rule in India, went alone, and there found himself under the authority of Vasco da Gama. Jerónimo, at school in Portugal, showed such prodigious ability in Latin that in 1519, when aged 13, his mother sent him to Salamanca in Spain to study civil law. Two years later, with further fluency in Latin and Greek, he returned home wanting to make a military career with the Knights Hospitaller in Rhodes: his father sent him back to Salamanca, where he worked to strengthen and discipline both body and mind for that calling when his father's objections should be overcome. But he developed strongly devotional feelings, and on his father's death his mother persuaded him to give up military ambitions.

In 1525, aged 19, he went to Paris to study Aristotelian logic and Natural philosophy. There he became a near associate of Peter Faber, who with his companion Francis Xavier and others was then drawing close to Ignatius of Loyola. Returning to Portugal to settle his affairs, Osório next proceeded for Theology to Bologna, immersing himself in the Church Fathers (particularly Gregory Nazianzen, St Basil, John Chrysostom, Augustine of Hippo and St Jerome) and St Thomas Aquinas and making a higher study of Cicero, Demosthenes and Plato. His Neoplatonic leanings were nourished by the Corpus Areopagiticum, the author of which he considered, next to the Apostles, to be the prince of theologians. He made such a name that King John III invited him in 1536–1537 to lecture in the reorganized University of Coimbra, where he expounded on Isaiah and on St Paul's Epistle to the Romans.

=== De Nobilitate ===
Returning to Lisbon in 1540 he became secretary to Prince Luís, and tutor to his son António (afterwards Prior of Crato), obtaining also two benefices in the diocese of Viseu. Before the age of 30 he had begun his twin treatises De Nobilitate Civili and De Nobilitate Christiana: their publication in Lisbon in 1542 rapidly won him international acclaim. His mastery of Latin style earned him the name "The Portuguese Cicero". After the death of Prince Luís in 1553, he withdrew from court to his churches. De Nobilitate was promoted by his friend Roger Ascham in England to William Paget, Cuthbert Tunstall, Sir William Petre and, in 1555, to Cardinal Pole. (To Pole he afterwards dedicated his work De Justitia Caeli.) He was named archdeacon of Évora in 1560, and much against his will became Bishop of Silves, the diocese of the Algarve, in 1564.

=== The English question ===
As Osório had denounced Machiavelli, so in addressing England he could denounce the influence of Martin Luther and Martin Bucer. As the Council of Trent drew towards its close, in 1562, at the prompting of Cardinal Henrique, Osório published a Latin epistle to Queen Elizabeth urging her to return to the Roman Catholic communion and to accept papal authority. An English translation, A Pearl for a Prince, was issued by Richard Shacklock, a Catholic Englishman at Louvain. Taken aback by this public reproach to its sovereign, the English government employed Walter Haddon to compose a Latin response, published in Paris (English translation by Abraham Hartwell (the elder)). Osório exceeded himself in a lengthy Latin reply (English version by John Fenn). Haddon prepared a rejoinder, but it remained unfinished at his death in 1572 and was completed in excellent style, and with additions, by John Foxe. The controversy was notorious and widely-read, and culminated in the Papal Bull Regnans in Excelsis being issued against Elizabeth. It is held that the name and colour of Osorio's diatribes influenced the character of Hieronimo in Thomas Kyd's drama The Spanish Tragedy.

=== Later years ===
The Cardinal Prince Henry, who had advanced him to the see of Silves, wished to employ him at Lisbon in state business when King Sebastian took up the reins of power in 1568, but Osório excused himself on the ground of his pastoral duties. In 1571 his extensive History of the reign of King Emmanuel was published at Lisbon, which rendered in his accomplished Latin much of the material in the Chronicle on the same subject by Damião de Góis. Encompassing the adventures of Vasco da Gama, it coincided with the publication of Os Lusíadas, The Lusiads, of his great contemporary Luís Vaz de Camões.

He further showed his zeal for the commonwealth by writing two letters, one seeking to dissuade the King from going to Africa, and the other sent during the latter's first expedition there calling upon him to return to his kingdom. Sebastian looked with disfavour on opponents of his African adventure, and Osório found it prudent to leave Portugal for Parma and Rome to make a visit ad limina. His scruples regarding residence, and the appeals of the King and the Cardinal Prince, prevented him from long enjoying the hospitality of Pope Gregory XIII. He therefore returned to his diocese, the seat of which was transferred from Silves to Faro in 1577, and continued there through the brief reign of the Cardinal King. He died at Tavira on 20 August 1580.

=== The library ===
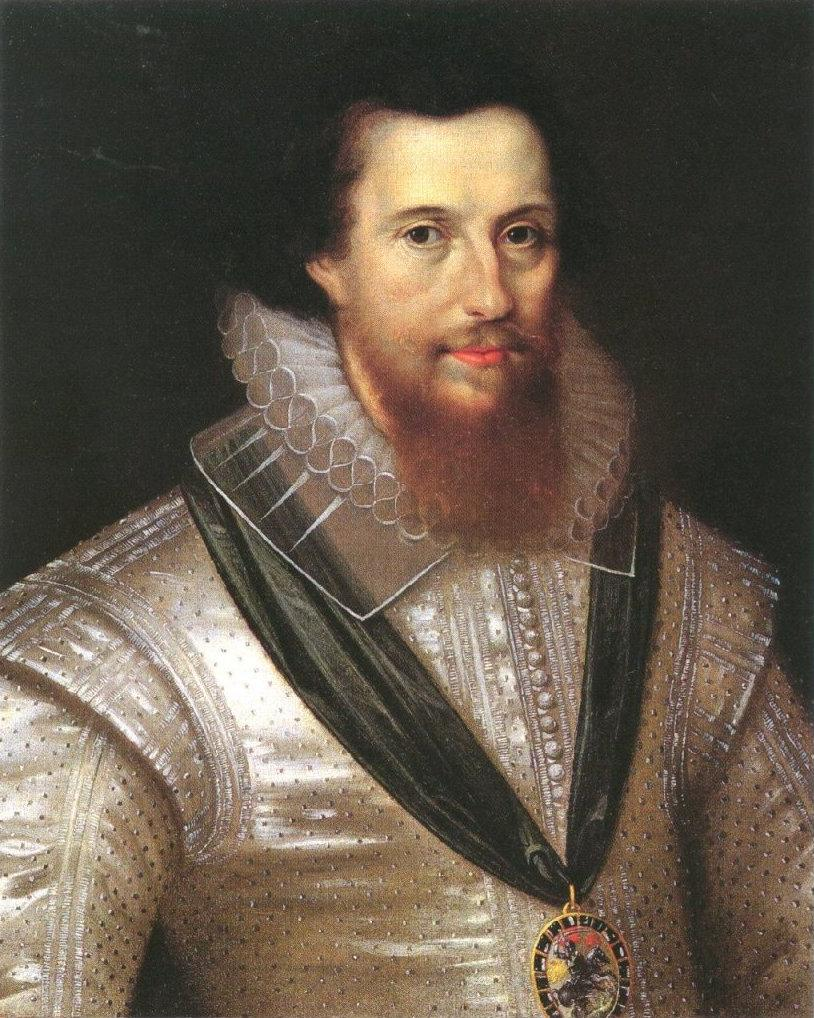
Robert Devereux, 2nd Earl of Essex

Haddon said of him that "he was a most perverse, overthwart Brawler, who besides a commendable Facility in the Latin Tongue, could profit the Publick nothing at all." It has been said that his library was carried off from Faro when the Earl of Essex, returning from the Capture of Cádiz, raided the town in 1596. The library taken by the Earl was that of Dom Fernando Martins Mascarenhas, then Bishop of Faro, whose house Essex occupied during the raid: it is said to have included many of Osorio's books. In 1600 Essex gave some 200 volumes to the Bodleian Library (then in the care of Thomas Bodley) in Oxford, none of which bear the signature of Bishop Osório. It is possible however that the early codex of Tomé Pires' Suma Oriental and the Book of the cartographer Francisco Rodrigues, among the French National Manuscript Collections, belonged to Osório.

== Works ==
His principal works written in Latin include:

- De Nobilitate Civile, et De Nobilitate Christiana (1542). Lisbon 1542 edition (Googlebooks). Florence 1552 edition (Googlebooks). The English version by William Blandie appeared in London in 1576.
- De Justitia Coelesti (1564) (Dedicated to Cardinal Pole). Cologne 1586 edition (Internet archive)
- De Gloria (1568). Alcalá de Henares (Compluti) 1568 edition (HathiTrust).
- De Regis Institutione et Disciplina (1571). Cologne 1574 edition (Googlebooks).
- De Rebus Emmanuelis Regis Lusitaniae Invictissimi Virtute et Auspicio Gestis (1571), Cologne 1586 edition (Internet archive).
- De Vera Sapientia (1578). Lisbon 1578 edition (Internet archive).

The Complete Works were collected and published in four volumes by his nephew in 1592:

- Volume I (Googlebooks): (Vita Auctoris, H.O. nepotis); De Nobilitate; De Gloria; De Regis Institutione; De Rebus Emmanuelis Gestis; Epistolae
- Volume II (Internet Archive): Epistolae ad Elizabetham Angliae et ad Gualterum Haddonum; De Justitia; De Sapientia; In Epistola Sci Pauli ad Romanos
- Volume III (Internet Archive): Paraphrasis in Job; Paraphrasis in Psalmos; (Notationes in illos, H.O., nepotis); Commentarius in Parabolas Salomonis; Paraphrasis in Sapentiam Salomonis; (Paraphrasis et Notationes in Cantica, H.O., nepotis)
- Volume IV (Googlebooks): Paraphrasis in Isaiam; Commentarius in Oseam Profetam; Commentarius in Zachariam; Oratio in Laudem D. Aecatherinae; In Evangelium Joannis

De Nobilitate was turned into Portuguese by Francisco Manoel de Nascimento, into French by J. Crispin (2 vols., Geneva, 1610), and an English paraphrase in 2 vols. by J. Gibbs came out in London in 1752. His Portuguese epistles were printed in Lisbon in two editions in 1818 and 1819, and in Paris in 1859.

== Attribution ==
- This is largely derived from the biographical note by F.A. Lobo.
