= Afonso de Castelo Branco =

Afonso de Castelo Branco, Bishop of Coimbra.

Afonso de Castelo Branco (Santiago do Cacém, 1522 – Coimbra, 12 May 1615) was a Portuguese Bishop and Viceroy of Portugal.

== Biography ==
Afonso de Castelo Branco was the illegitimate son of António de Castelo Branco, Dean of the Royal Chapel and paternal grandson of Martinho de Castelo Branco, 1st Count of Vila Nova de Portimão.

He held a Doctorate in Theology from the Faculty of Theology of the University of Coimbra. He became the 2nd Bishop of Faro, in 1581, and the 41st Bishop of Coimbra - 6th Count of Arganil by right of inheritance in 1585.

In 1603 he was appointed 5th Viceroy of Portugal by Philip II of Portugal, resigning from the post in the same year, to be again appointed 7th Viceroy of Portugal in 1604 by the same King until 24 May 1605.

He died in 1615 and was buried in the Old Cathedral of Coimbra.

Catholic Church titles
Preceded by Jerónimo Osório	Bishop of Faro; 1581 – 1585	Succeeded by Jerónimo Barreto
Preceded by Gaspar do Casal	Bishop of Coimbra; 1585 – 1615	Succeeded by Afonso Furtado de Mendonça
Government offices
Preceded by Cristóvão de Moura	Viceroy of Portugal; 1603–1603	Succeeded by Cristóvão de Moura
Preceded by Cristóvão de Moura	Viceroy of Portugal; 1604–1605	Succeeded by Pedro de Castilho
