= Cristóvão de Moura, 1st Marquis of Castelo Rodrigo =

Portuguese nobleman

Cristóvão de Moura
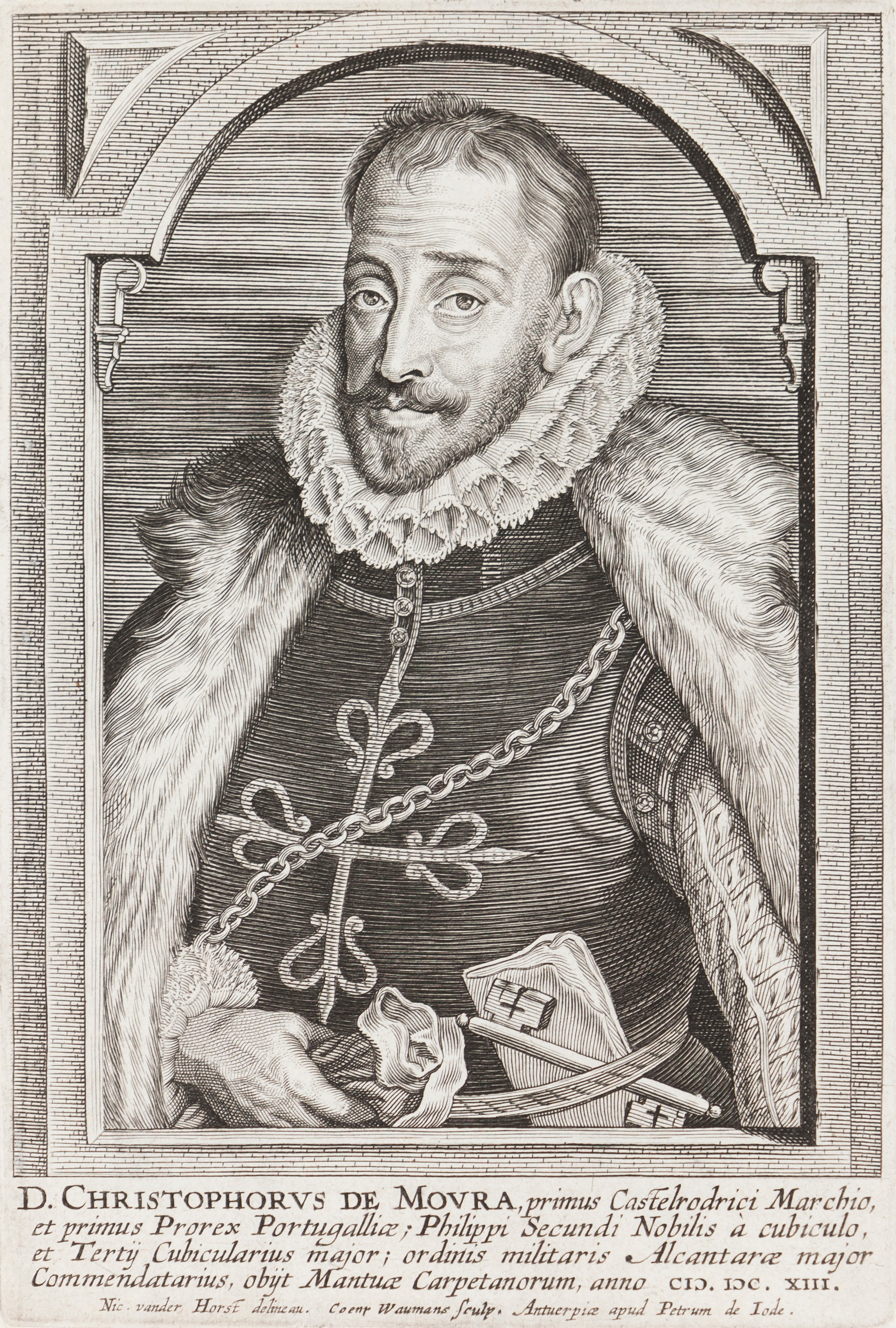

Viceroy of Portugal
- In office 29 January 1600 – 1603
- Monarch: Philip II of Portugal
- Preceded by: The Duke of Lerma
- Succeeded by: Afonso de Castelo Branco

Viceroy of Portugal
- In office 1603–1603
- Monarch: Philip II of Portugal
- Preceded by: Afonso de Castelo Branco
- Succeeded by: Afonso de Castelo Branco

Viceroy of Portugal
- In office February 1608 – 1612
- Monarch: Philipe II of Portugal
- Preceded by: Pedro de Castilho
- Succeeded by: Pedro de Castilho

Personal details
- Born: 1538 Lisbon, Portugal
- Died: 1613 (aged 74–75) Madrid, Spain
- Spouse: Margarida Corte-Real

D. Cristóvão de Moura e Távora (1538 in Lisbon – 1613 in Madrid) was a Portuguese nobleman who led the Spanish party during the Portuguese succession crisis of 1580.

== Biography ==
He was the son of D. Luís de Moura, Chief Equerry (estribeiro-mor) to Infante Duarte, and his wife, D. Brites de Távora, daughter of Cristóvão de Távora, 2nd Lord of the Majorat of Caparica, and his wife, Francisca de Sousa.

Established in Spain since 1554, and famous for his intelligence, Cristóvão de Moura was put in charge of diplomacy among the Portuguese nobility by Philip II of Spain, fuelling the political rivalry between the Prior of Crato and the Duke of Braganza, and gathering sympathisers to the cause of the Spanish monarch among the crust of Portuguese society and government.

After Philip II's accession to the Portuguese throne, Cristóvão de Moura was made part of the Council of Portugal, a five-member body that advised the sovereign on the government of the Kingdom of Portugal and its colonial empire. Among other privileges, the King rewarded his services with the post of Comptroller of the Exchequer (vedor da Fazenda) and, afterwards, granted him the title of 1st Count of Castelo Rodrigo (1594).

The king's son and successor, Philip III of Spain, made him the first Marquis of Castelo Rodrigo (1600). This king abolished the Council and named Cristóvão de Moura Viceroy of Portugal. He went on to serve as Viceroy in three separate occasions: first from 29 January 1600 to 1603, again in 1603, and from February 1608 to 1612. The government of the Marquis of Castelo Rodrigo was not well-liked by the Portuguese; the higher taxes he introduced were a contributing factor for this.

Cristóvão de Moura married Margarida Corte-Real, heiress of the Captaincy of Angra, in Terceira Island, Azores, in 1581. The marriage contract stipulated that their descendants would adopt the surname Corte-Real. The couple constructed the Corte Real palace in Lisbon.

== Descendants ==
Of his wife, Margarida Corte-Real

- D. Manuel de Moura Corte Real, 2nd Marquis of Castelo Rodrigo, who married D. Leonor de Melo, daughter of D. Nuno Álvares Pereira de Melo, 3rd Count of Tentúgal.
- D. Margarida Coutinho, who married D. Manrique de Silva, 1st Marquis of Gouveia, having no offspring.
- D. Maria de Mendonça, who married D. Afonso de Portugal, 5th Count of Vimioso and 1st Marquis of Aguiar.
- D. Beatriz de Moura, who married Fernando Afán de Ribera, 3rd Duke of Alcalá de los Gazules

Of Ana Afonso:

- Inês Afonso de Moura
