= Navicula (disambiguation) =

Navicula is a genus of boat-shaped diatom algae.

Navicula may also refer to:

- A vessel similar to a nef brought by the boat boy in Catholic and Anglican Churches
- Navicula de Venetiis or "little ship of Venice", an altitude dial used to tell time that was shaped like a little ship.

== See also ==
- List of Navicula species
- Navicular
