= Count of Vila da Horta =

The Count of Vila da Horta was a title created by Philip I of Portugal in 1585 in favor of Francisco de Mascarenhas.

The first count lost the captaincy of the island of Faial (and title), thereby requesting that King Philip I substitute his former-title for another. He was, therefore, given the title of Count of Santa Cruz, and donatary-captaincy of the islands of Corvo and Flores.

The Countship of Vila da Horta had only one titleholder:

- Francisco de Mascarenhas, 1st count of Vila da Horta, becoming the 1st count of Santa Cruz.
