= Abraham Hartwell (the elder) =

English poet

Abraham Hartwell the elder (fl. 1565), was an English poet, who wrote in Latin.

== Life ==
Hartwell was born in 1542 or 1543. He was educated at Eton College and admitted scholar at King's College, Cambridge, on 25 August 1559, becoming a fellow on 26 August 1562. He graduated B.A. in 1563, M.A. in 1567, and resigned his fellowship in 1567.

When Richard Shacklock published a translation of a letter written by the Portuguese bishop, Jerónimo Osório da Fonseca, urging Queen Elizabeth to return to Catholicism, Hartwell, a Protestant, responded with an English translation of Walter Haddon's Latin riposte to Osorio. Describing himself as "an Englishe man borne, one of the quenes majesties suppliauntes, and enfourmed in my countrie fashions", Hartwell accused the exiled Shacklock of "grosse ignorance of our English customes".

Four Latin lines by Thomas Newton in his Illustrium aliquot Anglorum Encomia (1589), addressed to Abraham Hartwell the younger, speak of the elder as a distinguished poet lately dead.

== Works ==
- Regina Literata sive de Serenissimæ Dominæ Elizabethæ … in Academiam Cantabrigiensem adventu, &c. Anno 1564, Aug. 5. Narratio Abrahami Hartvelli Cantabrigiensis, London, 1565, 8vo. Two long Latin letters to the reader and to Walter Haddon are prefixed to the poem, which is in elegiacs, containing over fifteen hundred lines: a few Latin epigrams on the subject of the queen's visit conclude the volume. One of these epigrams and two extracts from the poem were printed in Gabriel Harvey's Gratulationum Valdinensium Libri Quatuor, London, 1578, i. 2, ii. 5, iii. 3.
- A Sight of the Portugall Pearle, that is The Aunswere of D. Haddon Maister of the requests unto our soveraigne, Lady Elizabeth … against the epistle of Hieronimus Osorius a Portugall, entitled a Pearle for a Prince. Translated out of lattyn into Englishe by Abraham Hartwell, Student in the kynges colledge in Cambridge, London, 8vo, n.d. This tract contains an epistle 'To Mayster Shacklock' (translator of Osorius's 'Pearl'), and a preface dated Cambridge, 27 May 1565, besides some distichs of Latin verse.
- Nearly a hundred lines of elegiacs in memory of Paul Fagius, published in the university collection of verses on the restitution of the remains of Bucer and Fagius in 1560; they are to be found also in Martini Buceri Scripta Anglicana, Basle, 1577, p. 954.
- A few elegiacs prefixed to G. Haddoni … Lucubrationes, London, 1567.
- Nearly sixty lines, 'In Sanct. Martyrum Historiam', prefixed to the second edition of John Foxe's Acts and Monuments, 1570.

Some verses found in Robert Hacomblene's Commentarii in Aristotelis Ethica manuscript in King's College Library have also been ascribed to Hartwell, although Charles Henry Cooper in his Athenae Cantabrigienses disagreed with the attribution.
