= São Pedro (Angra do Heroísmo) =

- Civil parish
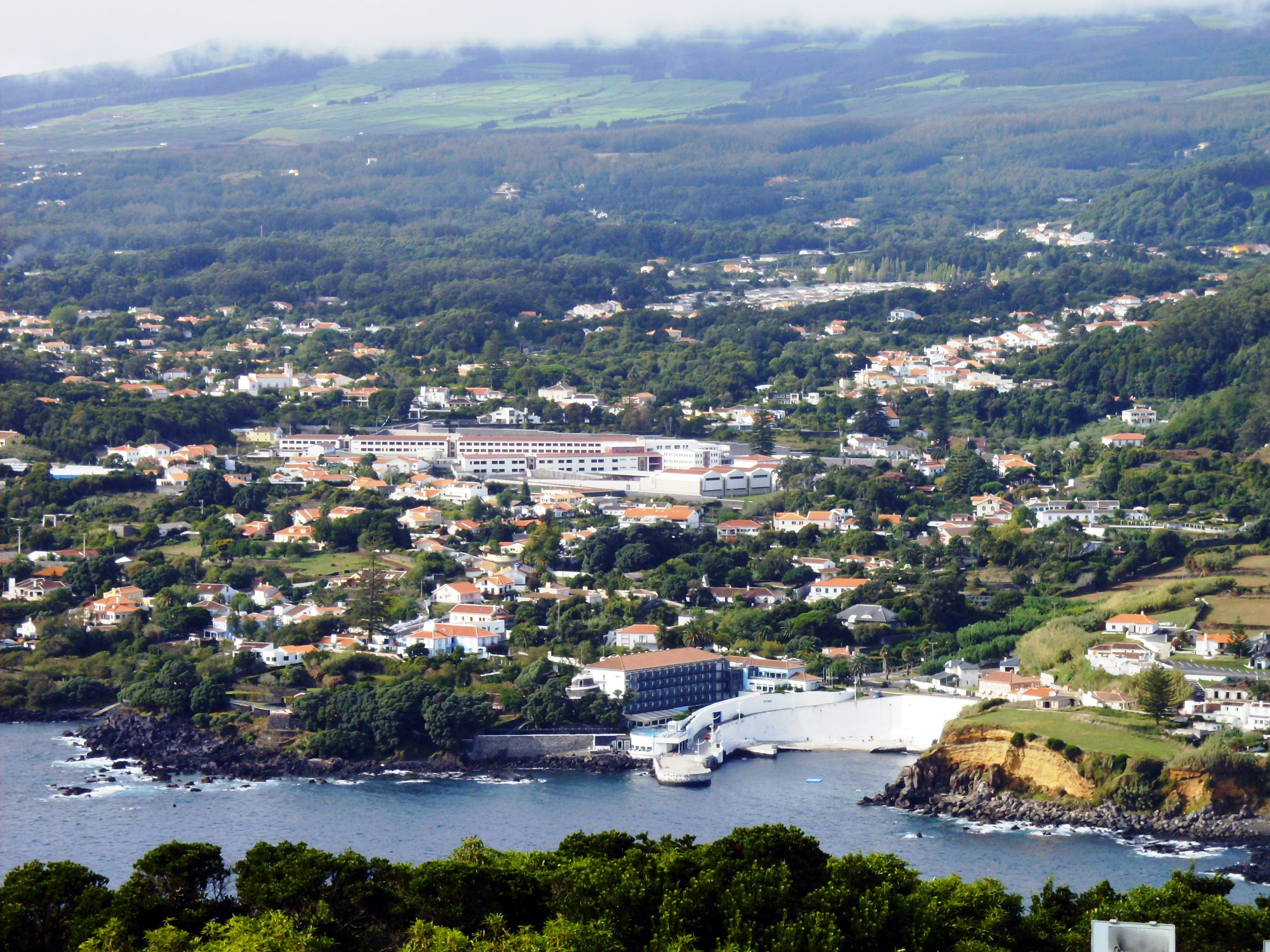
- The built-up corner of São Pedro, as seen from Monte Brasil

- Location in the Azores São Pedro (Terceira)
- Coordinates: 38°39′27″N 27°13′50″W
- Country: Portugal
- Auton. region: Azores
- Island: Terceira
- Municipality: Angra do Heroísmo
- Established: Settlement: fl. 1500; Parish: c. 1572; Civil parish: 20 May 1575

Area
  - Total: 3.66 km^{2} (1.41 sq mi)
- Elevation: 28 m (92 ft)

Population (2011)
  - Total: 3,460
  - Density: 945/km^{2} (2,450/sq mi)
- Time zone: UTC−01:00 (AZOT)
  - Summer (DST): UTC+00:00 (AZOST)
- Postal code: 9700-025
- Area code: (+351) 292 XX XX XX
- Patron: São Pedro
- Website: http://www.jfsaopedro.pt/

São Pedro (Portuguese for Saint Peter) is one of the five urban civil parishes of the municipality of Angra do Heroísmo on the island of Terceira in the Portuguese archipelago of the Azores. The population in 2011 was 3,460, in an area of 3.66 square kilometres (1.41 mi^{2}). The parish has a median elevation of 7 metres (23 ft).

== History ==
The first notice identifying the parish of São Pedro appeared in the first half of the 15th century, when it was then a convalescent retreat of Sé. In the testament of Pero Anes do Canto, dated 1543, when the nobleman indicated his interest in being buried in one of the hermitages of the parish.

In the A Fénix the church dedicated to the apostle Saint Peter was the third ecumenical parish of Angra: created in 1572 by Bishop Gaspar de Faria, who was the main benefactor, in addition to locals of the barrio. This included the area from the large water tank (chafariz das covas) until the gates of the old city., along with portions of São Mateus, Fonte Faneca and Terra-Chã (which in total amounted to 300 homes).

São Pedro was elevated to the status was confirmed by regal authority on 20 May 1575 (by then King John III.

== Geography ==
The parish constitutes the western part of the urbanized zone and city of Angra do Heroísmo and includes both the historic, as well as suburban, areas (such as São Carlos, Pico da Urze and Bicas de Cabo Verde) of the city. The parish contains the localities Cais da Silveira, Pico do Urze, Nossa Senhora da Penha de França, São Carlos, São Pedro and Vila Maria. Bairro de São Pedro is included in the zone classified as public interest in the city of Angra, although it does not include lands classified by UNESCO as World Heritage. The territory between the Portões de São Pedro and Silveira, along with rest of the parish situated to the interior of the express-way (Portuguese: Via Circular), is included in the area designated as public interest.
