= Abraham Hartwell =

English translator, antiquarian and Member of Parliament

Abraham Hartwell, the younger (1553/4–1606), was an English translator and antiquary, and Member of Parliament. Another Abraham Hartwell of the period was also an author, publishing Regina Literata in 1564, and the two have in the past been confused.

== Life ==
A student of Trinity College, Cambridge, he graduated BA in 1571 and M.A. in 1575, and was incorporated M.A. at Oxford in 1588. At Trinity College, Hartwell apparently attracted the notice of John Whitgift, who made him his secretary, reported in this capacity in 1584. A notary public, he was MP for East Looe in 1586 and Hindon in 1593.

Hartwell is recorded in 1587 as one of the proctors of the Archbishop of Canterbury's Court of Audience.

Hartwell met Richard Hakluyt, who urged him successfully to translate Odoardo Lopez's account of Africa. Hartwell later wrote that he did so "...to help our English Nation, that they might knowe and understand many things, which are common in other languages, but utterly concealed from this poore Island".

He was buried at Lambeth on 17 December 1606.

== Works ==
Three translations by him from the Italian are dedicated to Whitgift, 'at your Graces in Lambith.' He published:

- 'The History of the Warres betweene the Turkes and the Persians. Written in Italian by Iohn-Thomas Minadoi, and translated by Abr. Hartwell' (licensed 1588). The volume contained 'a new Geographicall Mappe.' Minadoi's 'Epistle to the Reader' is translated by Hartwell with the title 'the Author's,’ and has given rise to the notion that Hartwell was a traveller.
- 'A Report of the Kingdome of Congo, a Region of Africa And of the Countries that border rounde about the same...Drawen out of the writings and discourses of Odoardo Lopez, a Portingall, by Philippo Pigafetta,’ London, 1597, 4to. The 'Epistle to the Reader' tells that this translation was undertaken at the request of R. Hakluyt; the volume contains several cuts. It has been reprinted in 'Purchas his Pilgrimes,’ &c., pt. ii. 1625, and in 'A Collection of Voyages and Travels,’ vol. ii. 1745.
- 'The Ottoman of Lazaro Soranzo. Wherein is delivered ... a full and perfect report of the might and power of Mahomet the third, ... as also a true Description of divers peoples, Countries, Citties, and Voyages, which are most necessarie to bee knowen, especially at this time of the present Warre in Hungarie,’ London, 1603. A chance question of the archbishop's about Turkish 'Bassaes and Visiers' was the occasion of this translation.
- 'A True Discourse upon the matter of Martha Brossier of Romorantin, pretended to be possessed by a Divell,’ London, 1599, from the French. The dedication to Richard Bancroft, bishop of London, explains that the cases of possession and witchcraft at Nottingham which, in his capacity of secretary to the archbishop, Hartwell had become acquainted with had suggested this translation to him. She was examined by Louis Duret and Jean Riolan and found she had nothing from the devil, but many pretended things plus a few diseases.

Hartwell was the last member admitted into the old Society of Antiquaries. Two short papers which he wrote for the society are printed in Thomas Hearne's 'Curious Discourses,’ London, 1771; they are entitled 'Of Epitaphs' (ii. 375), and 'Of the Antiquity, Variety, and Reason of Motts with Arms of Noblemen and Gentlemen in England' (i. 278), and were both read before the society in 1600.

Two of Hartwell's letters to Whitgift written in Latin survive in the Cambridge University Library.
