= Count of Portalegre =

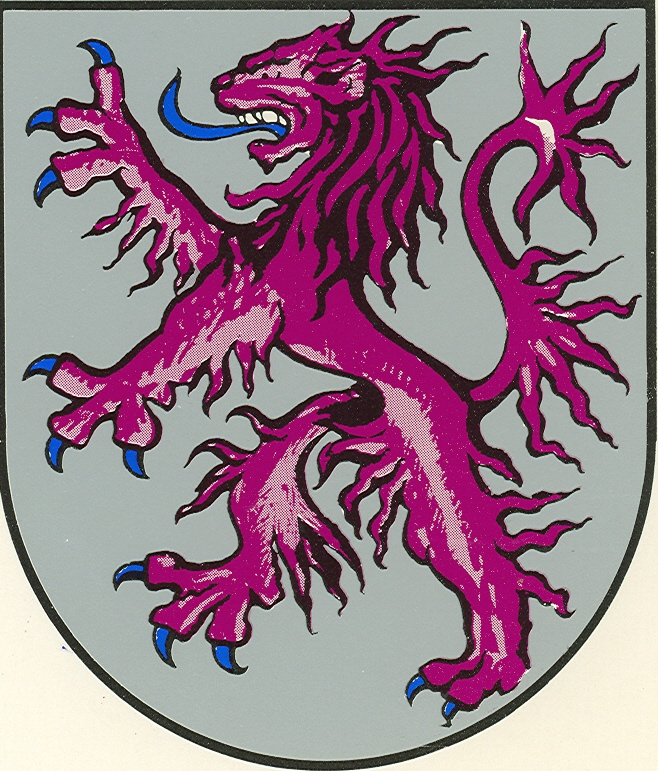
The Coat of Arms of the Silva family, Counts of Portalegre and Marquesses of Gouvêa.

Count of Portalegre is a Portuguese title of nobility created by Letters Patent dated 6 February 1498 by King Manuel I of Portugal granted to D. Diogo da Silva.

D. Diogo da Silva was the son of D. Rui Gomes da Silva, Governor of Campo Maior and his wife D. Isabel de Menezes, natural daughter of D. Pedro de Menezes, 1st Count of Vila Real.

The 3rd Count of Portalegre, D. Álvaro da Silva, was succeeded by his granddaughter, D. Filipa da Silva, thanks to a royal dispensation of the Lei Mental, which stated that all Crown assets, including titles of nobility, could only be inherited by male primogeniture.

Filipa married twice, in both cases with distant cousins. Firstly to D. Pedro de Lancastre, son of the 1st Duke of Aveiro, with whom she had one daughter who died young. Her second marriage was to the Spanish ambassador, Juan de Silva, very influential during the reign of Sebastian I of Portugal and who, on his marriage, became 4th Count of Portalegre and inherited the office of Mordomo-mór. He participated with the Portuguese in the Battle of Alcacer Quibir, where he fell prisoner to the moors. During the transitional reign of Henry I of Portugal, the Cardinal King, he was a firm supporter of Philip II of Spain's claims to the throne of Portugal.

The Habsburgs rewarded this House's fidelity with new honours and titles, elevating the 6th Count to the marquessate of Gouvêa, a Portuguese noble title granted by Letters Patent of King Philip III of Portugal, (IV of Spain), dated 20 January 1625). The title of Count of Portalegre was then used by the heir presumptive of the House of Gouvêa.

When the 2nd Marquess of Gouvêa died without issue, this assets, honours and titles were incorporated into the House of the Counts of Santa Cruz, with the 5th Count inheriting the office of Mordomo-mor and his eldest son the marquessate of Gouvêa.

The 6th Marquess of Gouvêa died without legitimate issue, following the unfortunate trial of his father, 5th Marquess of Gouvêa and 8th Duke of Aveiro, who was found guilty of treason. His inheritable assets were passed on to his cousin, the 3rd Marquess of Lavradio, eldest grandson of his father's sister, whose legitimate issue continues to the present day.

== List of counts of Portalegre ==
1. Diogo da Silva, 1st Count of Portalegre (1430- ? );
2. João da Silva, 2nd Count of Portalegre (1480- ? ), son of the 1st count;
3. Álvaro da Silva, 3rd Count of Portalegre (1505–1580), son of the 2nd count;
4. Filipa da Silva, 4th Countess of Portalegre (1550–1590), granddaughter of the 3rd count;
5. Diogo da Silva, 5th Count of Portalegre (1579–1640), older son of the 4th counts;
6. Manrique da Silva, 6th Count of Portalegre (1585- ? ), younger son of the 4th counts, became 1st Marquess of Gouvêa in 1625;
7. João da Silva, 7th Count of Portalegre (1625–1686), son of the previous count; also 2nd Marquess of Gouvêa, died without issue.

== See also ==
- Marquess of Gouvêa
- Duke of Aveiro
- Marquess of Lavradio
- Count of Santa Cruz
- List of marquisates in Portugal
- List of countships in Portugal
