= Diocese of Angra =

Roman Catholic diocese in Portugal

Coordinates: 38°39′19.04″N 27°13′15.41″W

Roman Catholic Diocese of Angra Dioecesis Angrensis Diocese de Angra

Catholic
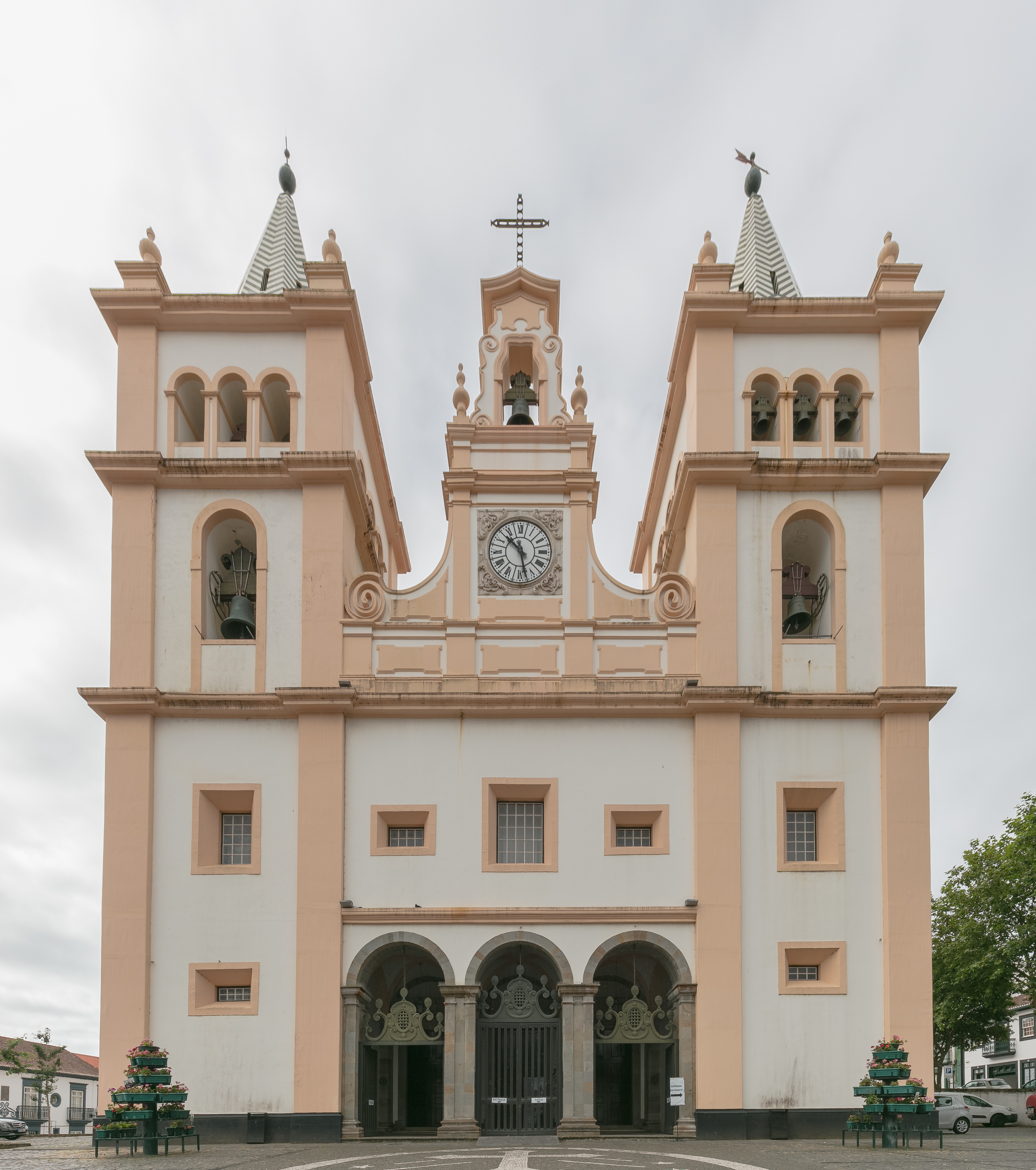
- The Sé Cathedral of Angra

Location
- Country: Portugal
- Territory: Azores
- Ecclesiastical province: Lisbon
- Metropolitan: Patriarchate of Lisbon

Statistics
- Area: 2,243 km^{2} (866 sq mi)
- Population: Total; Catholics: (as of 2022); 236,440; 205,360 (86.9%)
- Parishes: 165

Information
- Denomination: Roman Catholic
- Rite: Roman rite
- Established: 5 November 1534
- Cathedral: Cathedral of the Holy Savior in Angra do Heroísmo
- Patron saint: São Salvador do Mundo; Blessed John Baptist Machado

Current leadership
- Pope: Leo XIV
- Bishop: Armando Esteves Domingues
- Metropolitan Archbishop: Manuel III

Map
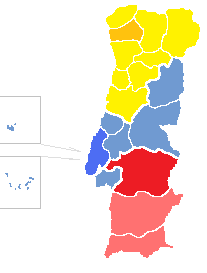

Website
- Website of the Diocese

The Diocese of Angra (Portuguese: Diocese de Angra, Latin: Dioecesis Angrensis) is a Latin Church diocese of the Catholic church in the Portuguese archipelago of the Azores. The see is located in Angra do Heroísmo, in the Terceira island. The current Ordinary is Armando Esteves Domingues.

== History ==
The Azores, like all the islands and lands discovered during the Portuguese Age of Discoveries, began as jurisdictions of the Order of Christ, under the direction of the vicar of Tomar (Latin: vicarius nullius).

Upon the creation of the Bishopric of Funchal, in 1514, the communities of the Azores began to fall within the jurisdiction of the Bishop of Funchal. As the result of a petition by King John III of Portugal, Pope Clement VII created the Bishopric of São Miguel (São Salvador), but this patriarch died (31 January 1533) before a Papal bull was issued. The request to Clement VII included the creation of two new Dioceses, one for the islands of the Azores and the other for the settlements established along the coast of Western African (or its frontiers).

A papal bull entitled Æquum reputamus, was issued by Pope Paul III on 3 November 1534, that reorganized the religious jurisdiction of the nascent Empire of Portugal in the lines of the original petition (retroactively to the original Clement VII bull): based on John III's petition and creating the Diœcesis Angrensis for the Azores. The bull was part of a group of decrees and concessions to the Portuguese clergy, beginning with the bull Dum diversas on 18 June 1452.

The following year, Pope Paul III elevated the Bishopric of São Salvador, reclassified the Church of São Salvador as a cathedral and placed it under the suffragan of the Archbishop of Funchal. In 1550, the diocese was transferred to the suffragan of the metropole of Lisbon. It was vacant from 1637 to 1671.

=== Bishops of Angra ===
Since its creation, the Diocese of Angra has been governed by the following bishops:

- Agostinho Ribeiro (1534–1540)
- Rodrigo Pinheiro (1540–1552)
- Jorge de Santiago, OP (1552–1561)
- Manuel de Almada (1564–1567)
- Nuno Álvares Pereira (1568–1570)
- Gaspar de Faria (1571–1576)
- Pedro de Castilho (1578–1583)
- Manuel de Gouveia (1584–1596)
- Jerónimo Teixeira Cabral (1600–1612)
- Agostinho Ribeiro (1614–1621)
- Pedro da Costa (1623–1625)
- João Pimenta de Abreu (1626–1632)
- António da Ressurreição, OP (1635–1637)
- Lourenço de Castro, OP (1671–1678)
- João dos Prazeres, OFM (1683–1685)
- Clemente Vieira, OAD (1688–1692)
- António Vieira Leitão (1694–1714)
- João de Brito e Vasconcelos (1718)
- Manuel Álvares da Costa (1721–1733)
- Valério do Sacramento, OFM (1738–1757)
- António Caetano da Rocha (1758–1772)
- João Marcelino dos Santos Homem Aparício (1774–1782)
- José da Avé-Maria Leite da Costa e Silva (1783–1799)
- José Pegado de Azevedo (1802–1812)
- Alexandre da Sagrada Família, OFM (1816–1818)
- Manuel Nicolau de Almeida, OCD (1820–1825)
- Estêvão de Jesus Maria, OFM (1827–1870)
- João Maria Pereira de Amaral e Pimentel (1872–1889)
- Francisco Maria do Prado Lacerda (1889–1891)
- Francisco José Ribeiro Vieira e Brito (1892–1901)
- José Manuel de Carvalho (1902–1904)
- José Correia Cardoso Monteiro (1905–1910)
- Manuel Damasceno da Costa (1915–1922)
- António Augusto de Castro Meireles (1924–1928)
- Guilherme Augusto Inácio de Cunha Guimarães (1928–1957)
- Manuel Afonso de Carvalho (1957–1978)
- D. Aurélio Granada Escudeiro (1979–1996)
- António de Sousa Braga (1996–2016)
- Joao Evangelista Pimentel Lavrador (2016–2021)
- Armando Esteves Domingues (2022–present)

== Diocese ==
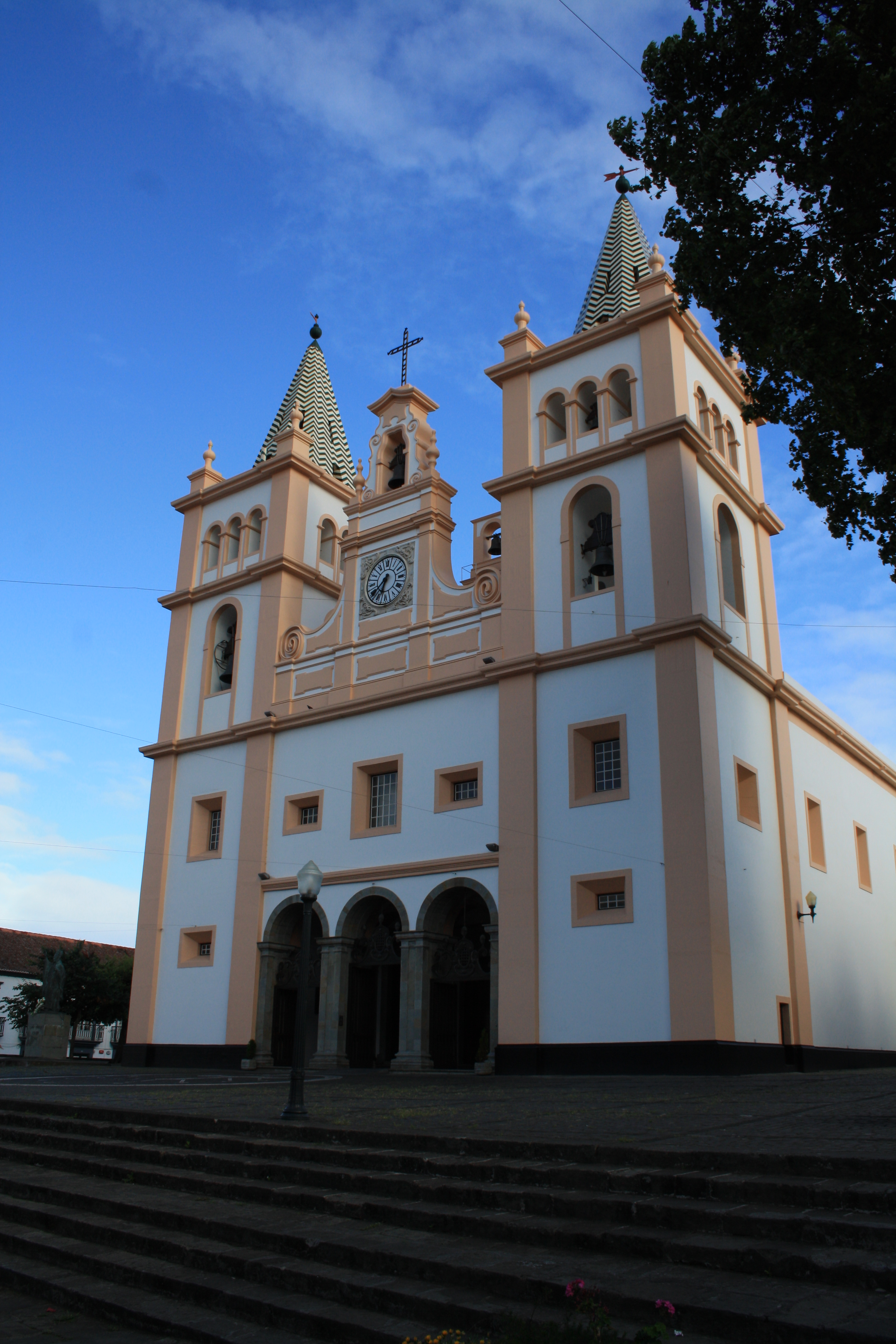
The cathedral as it appeared at the end of the 20th century

The episcopal see remains a suffragan of the patriarch of Lisbon, Cardinal Manuel Clemente, and serves the entirety of the archipelago of the Azores.

== See also ==
- Catholic Church in the Azores
- List of Roman Catholic dioceses in Portugal
- Roman Catholicism in Portugal
