= Gaspar de Faria =

Portuguese bishop

- Bishop of Angra
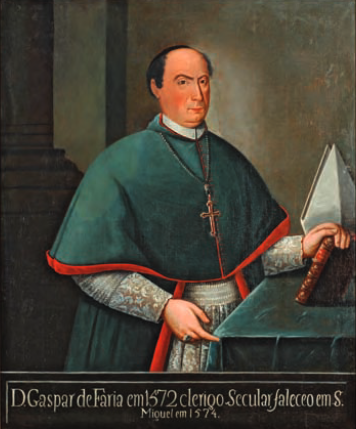
- 6th Bishop of Angra
- Church: Sé Cathedral of Angra
- Province: São João Evangalista
- Diocese: Angra
- Appointed: 1571
- Installed: 1572
- Term ended: 1576
- Predecessor: Nuno Álvares Pereira
- Successor: Pedro de Castilho

Personal details
- Born: 1520 Barcelos
- Died: March 19, 1576 Angra do Heroísmo (Azores), Portugal
- Buried: Angra do Heroísmo (Azores), Portugal
- Denomination: Roman Catholic
- Residence: Agualva, Praia da Vitória (Azores), Portugal
- Parents: Sebastião de Faria (father); Grácia Machado (mother)
- Occupation: Bishop
- Profession: Religious
- Education: University of Coimbra

Gaspar de Faria (Barcelos, c. 1520 — Angra, 19 March 1576), was the 6th Bishop of Angra, governing the Diocese between 1571 and 1576.

== Early life ==
Gaspar de Faria was the son of Sebastião de Faria and, his wife, Grácia Machado, a family of Barcelos.

== Bishop ==
He was clergy in the habit of Saint Peter, doctored in the sacred canons at the University of Coimbra, presented to bishopric of Angra by the Vicar-General of the Archbishopric of Lisbon. After being confirmed as Bishop of Angra, by papal bull Gratiae divinae preamium issued by Pope Pius V, on 15 October 1571, he arrived at his post in 1572.

One of his first actions was to establish vicarages to represent all the ecumenical parishes of the island of Terceira, which included São Pedro and São Bento in the city of Angra. He was one of the first prelates of Angra to visit the islands that corresponded to the Diocese, with notice that he celebrated mass at the Church of São Sebastião in the city of Ponta Delgada. The bishop was also attributed with the creation, around 1576, of the parish of São Pedro da Ribeira Seca, on the outskirts of the town of Ribeira Grande. The parish of Santa Clara was also created at the beginning of 1570, during the bishop's prelature, obtaining its seat in the hermitage of its invocation that already existed before the 1522 earthquake. Yet, his visit to São Miguel was not all that calm, as he launched an injunction against the nuns at the Convent of Esperança, in Ponta Delgada. This resulted in the nuns sending the Franciscan Brás Camelo, who was able to obtain a determination against the injunction, from the Cardinal-King Henry. The King, therefore, sent Luís de Vasconcelos, rector of the College of the Society of Jesus, in order to smooth the conflict between the nuns and prelate.

There is also notice that he celebrated mass in the parochial Church of Vila Nova (in Praia da Vitória) on the day of Pentecosts, signalling that the settlement of Ramo Grande was already, by the 16th century, the center of the Cult of the Holy Spirit on the island of Terceira.

Alleging his "inspiration by God", managed to quell the scandal that developed with the marriage of Beatriz Dinis, daughter of Gonçalo Vaz Dinis, with Brás Lourenço do Rego, and members of the principal families of the islands.

Despite understanding the inclinations of King Sebastian, in favor of the economic situation clergy, many of the payments were being hindered by others with the Cortes, and the bishop appealed directly to the king, and was attended on 4 September 1572. He later obtained a regal writ from King John III, dated 4 September 1572, so that local clergy could be paid 2:1 in wheat and monies, while on the remaining islands the payment was evenly divided. In this writ, wheat was equivalent to 3$300 réis per moio, noting its importance.

== Later life ==
For many years Bishop Faria lived along the margins of the Ribeira dos Moinhos in the northern parish of Agualva, municipality of Praia da Vitória, in a small farm with orchards, noting that the air and waters of the area were fresh and of the highest quality. The farm, identifiable by an episcopal coat-of-arms, was for a period linked to buried silver and money, which the prelate had hidden away, but was recuperated years later by other property-owners.

Bishop Gaspar de Faria died suddenly in the Sé Cathedral of Angra, and was buried alongside the epistle side of the altar of the Santíssmo Sacramento.

== Sources ==
- Bruno, Jorge A. Paulus, ed. (2009), Retrato dos Bispos de Angra (in Portuguese), Angra do Heroísmo (Azores), Portugal: Museum of Angra do Heroísmo
- Sousa, António Caetano de, "Catálogo dos bispos de Angra", Colecção dos Documentos e Memórias da Academia Real de História (in Portuguese), vol. II, Lisbon, Portugal
- Pereira, José Augusto (1950), A Diocese de Angra na História dos seus Prelados (in Portuguese), Angra do Heroísmo (Azores), Portugal: União Gráfica Angrense
- Frutuoso, Gaspar (1998), Saudades da terra (in Portuguese), vol. IV, Ponta Delgada (Azores), Portugal: Instituto Cultural de Ponta Delgada
