= Miguel de Castro =

Portuguese archbishop and viceroy

His Excellency Miguel de Castro
- Archbishop of Lisbon, Viceroy of Portugal
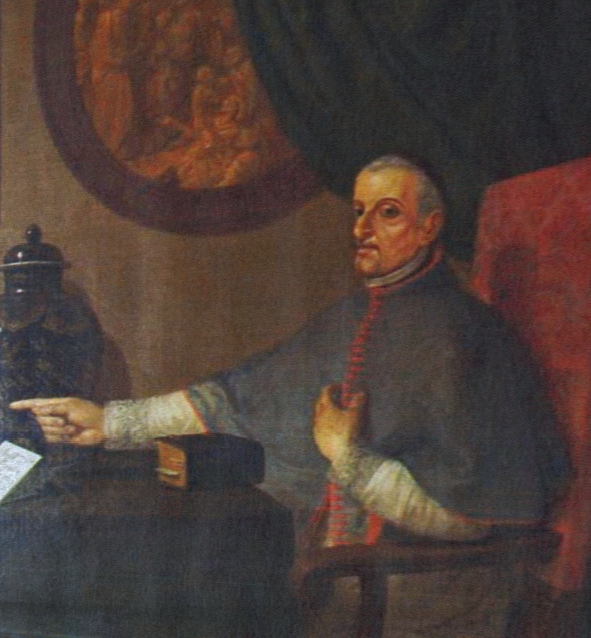
- Portrait by Vieira Lusitano, 1755
- Church: Roman Catholic Church
- Archdiocese: Lisbon
- See: Cathedral of St. Mary Major
- Installed: 26 February 1586
- Term ended: 1 July 1625
- Predecessor: Jorge de Almeida
- Successor: Afonso Furtado de Mendonça
- Other post: Bishop of Viseu (1579–86)

Personal details
- Born: 1536
- Died: 1 July 1625 Lisbon, Portugal
- Education: University of Coimbra (Th.D.)

Dom Miguel de Castro (Évora, 1536- 1 July 1625) was Bishop of Viseu in 1579, Archbishop of Lisbon in 1586, and later Viceroy of Portugal. He received his doctorate in Theology at the University of Coimbra, and was appointed Inquisitor of the Holy Office in 1556, eleven years later becoming a member of the General Council.

== Biography ==
He was born in Évora, as son of Diego de Castro, Mayor of Alegrete and Sabugal and Felipa de Ataíd , Chief Lady-in-Waiting to Queen Catherine.
He earned a doctorate in Theology from the University of Coimbra. Shortly after receiving his doctorate, he was granted the priorship of the Church of São Cristóvão in Lisbon. In 1566, he was appointed Inquisitor of the Holy Office of Lisbon, and in 1577, Deputy of the General Council of the Inquisition.
Protected by the Cardinal-King Henry of Portugal, he ascended to the prelacy of Viseu in 1579.

Like his family, Miguel de Castro, supported Philip II of Spain during the Portuguese succession crisis of 1580. Thus, as Bishop of Viseu, he attended the Cortes of Tomar, which proclaimed Philip II King of Portugal. This staunch support allowed him to hold important positions in the administration during the following years. He was a member of the Privy Council, which advised Viceroy Albert VII of Austria on matters of governance and in 1585, he was named Archbishop of Lisbon, successor to Don Jorge de Almeida.

He also directed the reprinting of the Constituições do Arcebispado de Lisboa "both the old and the extravagant." D. Miguel held high positions during the Philippine rule, being one of the Governors of the Kingdom in 1593.

A biography of Bartolomeu da Costa was dedicated to him, in 1611, by António Carvalho de Parada.

In 1615 he succeeded Archbishop Aleixo de Menezes as Viceroy of Portugal, a post he held for two years.

Government offices
Preceded by Aleixo de Menezes	Viceroy of Portugal; 1615–1617	Succeeded by Diego de Silva y Mendoza
