= Aurélio Granada Escudeiro =

Portuguese prelate

- Bishop of Diocese of Angra Emeritus
- Church: Roman Catholic Church
- See: Diocese of Angra
- In office: 1979 - 1996
- Predecessor: Manuel Afonso de Carvalho
- Successor: António de Sousa Braga

Orders
- Ordination: 17 January 1943

Personal details
- Born: 19 May 1920 Alcains, Portugal
- Died: 25 August 2012 (aged 92) Ponta Delgada, Azores

Aurélio Granada Escudeiro (19 May 1920 – 25 August 2012) was a Portuguese prelate of the Roman Catholic Church.

Escudeiro was born in Alcains, Portugal and was ordained a priest on 17 January 1943.

He was appointed Coadjutor Bishop of the Diocese of Angra on 18 March 1974 as well as titular bishop of Drusiliana, and was ordained bishop on 26 May 1974. Escudeiro was appointed Bishop of the Diocese of Angra on 30 June 1979, where he would serve until his retirement on 9 April 1996.

He died on 25 August 2012 at the Casa Sacerdotal in Ponta Delgada.
