= António de Sousa Braga =

Roman Catholic prelate (1941–2022)

His Excellency António de Sousa Braga S.C.I.
- Bishop Emeritus of Angra
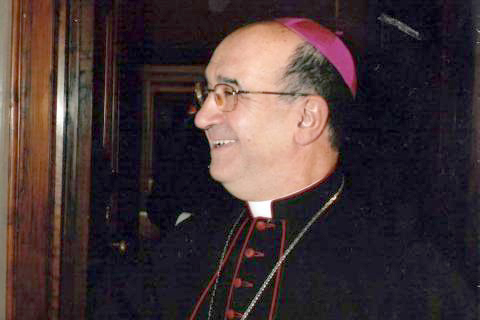
- Metropolis: Lisbon
- Diocese: Angra
- Appointed: 9 April 1996
- Term ended: 15 March 2016
- Predecessor: Aurélio Granada Escudeiro
- Successor: João Evangelista Pimentel Lavrador

Orders
- Ordination: 17 May 1970 by Pope Paul VI
- Consecration: 30 June 1996 by Aurélio Granada Escudeiro

Personal details
- Born: 15 March 1941 Santo Espirito, Portugal
- Died: 22 August 2022 (aged 81) Lisbon, Portugal

António de Sousa Braga S.C.I. (15 March 1941 – 22 August 2022) was a Portuguese Roman Catholic prelate.

De Sousa was born in Portugal and was ordained to the priesthood in 1970. He served as bishop of the Roman Catholic Diocese of Angra, Portugal from 1996 until his retirement in 2016.

Catholic Church titles
Preceded by Aurélio Granada Escudeiro	Bishop of Angra; 1996–2016	Succeeded by João Evangelista Pimentel Lavrador
