= Francisco Manoel de Nascimento =

Portuguese poet

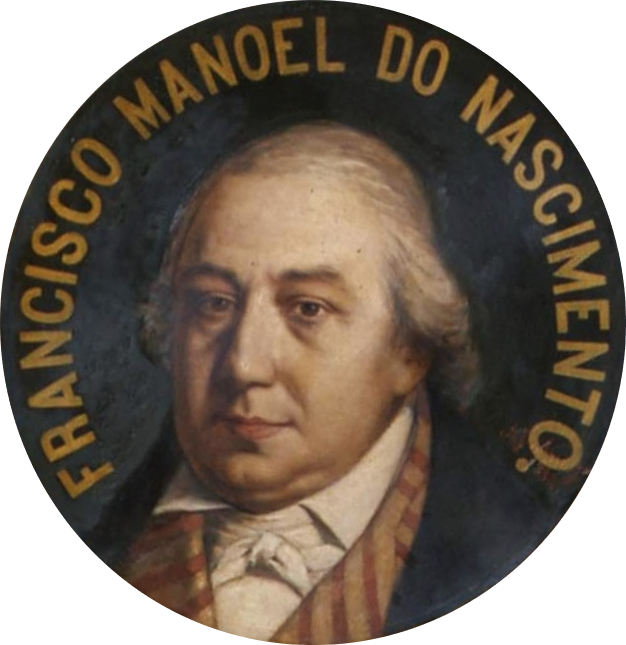
- Born: 21 December 1734; Lisbon, Portugal
- Died: 25 February 1819 (aged 84); Paris, France
- Occupation: Poet

Francisco Manoel de Nascimento (21 December 1734 – 25 February 1819), better known by the literary name of Filinto Elísio (in the old orthography Filinto Elysio), bestowed on him by the Marquise of Alorna, was a Portuguese poet and the reputed son of a Lisbon boat-owner.

== Early years ==
In his early years he acquired a love of national customs and traditions which his humanist education never obliterated. In addition, he learnt to know the whole range of popular literature (litteratura de cordel) songs, comedies, knightly stories and fairy tales, which were then printed in loose sheets (folhas volantes) and sold by the blind in the streets of the capital. These circumstances explain the richness of his vocabulary, and joined to an ardent patriotism they fitted him to become the herald of the literary revival known as Romanticism, which was inaugurated by his distinguished follower Almeida Garrett.

Nascimento began to write verses at the age of fourteen. He was ordained a priest in 1754, and shortly afterwards became treasurer of the Chagas church in Lisbon. He led a retired life, and devoted his time to the study of the Latin classics, especially Horace, and to the society of literary friends, among whom were numbered some cultivated foreign merchants. These men nourished the common ambition to restore Camões, then half forgotten, to his rightful place as the king of the Portuguese Parnassus, and they proclaimed the cult of the Quinhentistas, regarding them as the best poetical models, while in philosophy they accepted the teaching of the French Encyclopaedists.

Nascimento's first publication was a version of one of Pietro Metastasio's operas, and his early work consisted mainly of translations. Though of small volume and merit, it sufficed to arouse the jealousy of his brother bards. At this time the Arcadia was working to restore good taste and purify the language of gallicisms, but the members of this society forgot the traditions of their own land in their desire to imitate the classics.

Nascimento and other writers who did not belong to the Arcadia, formed themselves into a rival group, which met at the Ribeira das Naus, and the two bodies attacked one another in rhyme without restraint, until the "war of the poets", as it was called, ended with the collapse of the Arcadia. Nascimento now conceived a strong but platonic affection for D. Maria de Almeida, afterwards Condessa da Ribeira, sister of the famous poet the Marquise of Alorna. This lady sang the chansonnettes he wrote for her, and their poetical intercourse drew from him some lyrics of profound emotion.

== The Inquisition ==
This was the happiest epoch of his life, but it did not last long. The accession of D. Maria I inaugurated an era of reaction against the spirit and reforms of Pombal, and religious succeeded to political intolerance. In June 1778 Nascimento was denounced to the Portuguese Inquisition on the charge of having given vent to heterodox opinions and read the works of modern philosophers who follow natural reason. The tribunal held a secret inquiry, and without giving him an opportunity of defence issued an order for his arrest, which was to take place early in the morning of the 14th of July. He had received a warning, and succeeded in escaping to the house of a French merchant, Verdier, where he lay hid for eleven days, at the end of which his friend the Marquis of Marialva put him on board a French ship which carried him to Havre.

Nascimento took up his residence in Paris, and his first years there passed pleasantly enough. Soon, however, his circumstances changed for the worse. He received the news of the confiscation of his property by the Inquisition; and though he strove to support himself by teaching and writing he could hardly make ends meet.

In 1792 his admirer António de Araújo, afterwards Count of Barca, then Portuguese minister to the Dutch Republic, offered the poet the hospitality of his house at the Hague, but neither the country, the people, nor the language were congenial, and when his host went to Paris on a diplomatic mission in 1797 Nascimento accompanied him, and spent the rest of his life in and near the French capital.

== Return to Portugal ==
He retained to the end an intense love of country, which made him wish to die in Portugal, and in 1796 a royal decree permitting his return there and ordering the restoration of his goods was issued, but delays occurred in its execution, and the transfer of the court to the Portuguese colony of Brazil as a result of the French invasion finally dashed his hopes. Before this the Count of Barca had obtained him a commission from the Portuguese government to translate the De Rebus Emanuelis of Jerónimo Osório; the assistance of some fellow-countrymen in Paris carried him through his last years, which were cheered by the friendship of his biographer and translator Alexandre Sane and of the Lusophil Ferdinand Dénis. Lamartine addressed an ode to him; he enjoyed the esteem of Chateaubriand; and his admirers at home, who imitated him extensively, were called after him Os Filintistas. Exile and suffering had enlarged his ideas and given him a sense of reality, making his best poems those he wrote between the ages of seventy and eighty-five, and when he died, it was recognised that Portugal had lost her foremost contemporary poet.

== Poetry ==
Garrett declared that Nascimento was worth an academy in himself by his knowledge of the language, adding that no poet since Camões had rendered it such valuable services. By his life, as by his works, Nascimento links the 18th and 19th centuries, the Neo-Classical period with Romanticism. Wieland's Oberon and Chateaubriand's Martyrs opened a new world to him, and his contos, or scenes of Portuguese life, have a romantic flavour; they are the most natural of his compositions, though his patriotic odes — those "To Neptune speaking to the Portuguese" and "To the liberty and independence of the United States" — are the most quoted and admired.

On leaving Portugal, he abandoned the use of rhyme as cramping freedom of thought and expression; nevertheless his highly polished verses are generally robust to hardness and overdone with archaisms. His translations from Latin, French and Italian, are accurate though harsh, and his renderings of Racine and the Fables of Lafontaine entirely lack the simplicity and grace of the originals. But Nascimento's blank verse translation of the Martyrs is in many ways superior to Chateaubriand's prose.

== Bibliography ==
The most useful edition of his collected works is that in 22 vols., Lisbon, 1836-1840. See Innocencio da Silva, Diccionario bibliographico Portuguez, ii. 446-457 and ix. 332-336; also Filinto Elysio e a sua Epoca, by Pereira da Silva (Rio, 1891); and Filinto Elysio, by Dr Teófilo Braga (Porto, 1891).
