= Catholic Church in the Azores =

The Catholic Church in The Azores is part of the worldwide Roman Catholic Church, under the spiritual leadership of the Pope in Rome. The Azores was under the Grand Prior of the Order of Christ, and had their first diocese established in 1534 by Pope Paul III. The diocese was originally suffragan to Funchal, but in 1547 it was put under the jurisdiction of the archdiocese of Lisbon.

== See also ==
- Catholic Church by country
- Diocese of Angra (the Azores)
