= Aleixo de Menezes =

Portuguese Catholic prelate and politician (1559–1617)

Alexeu de Jesu de Meneses O.S.A.
- Archbishop of Braga
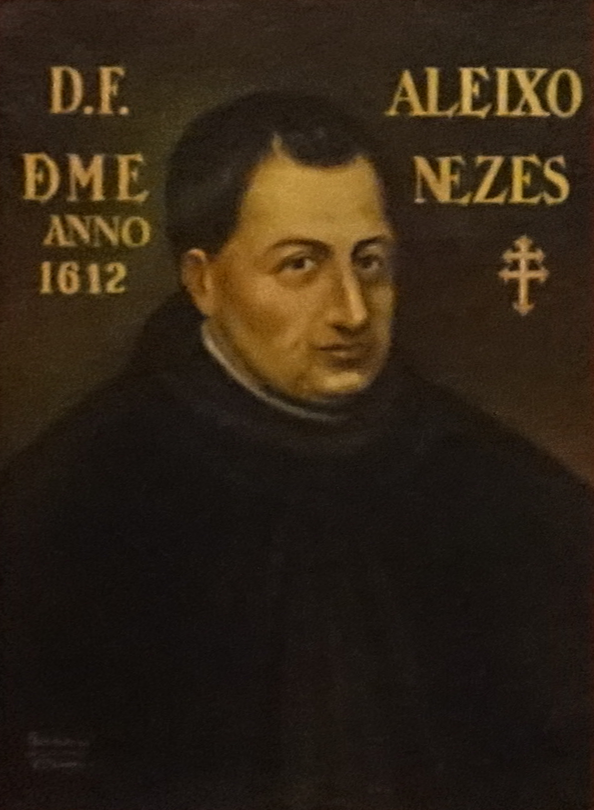
- Church: Catholic Church
- Archdiocese: Archdiocese of Braga
- In office: 19 March 1612 – 3 May 1617
- Predecessor: Agostinho de Jesus
- Successor: Afonso Furtado de Mendonça
- Previous post: Archbishop of Goa (1595-1612)

Orders
- Consecration: 26 March 1596 by Fabio Biondi da Montalto

Personal details
- Born: 25 January 1559 Lisbon, Kingdom of Portugal and the Algarves
- Died: 3 May 1617 (aged 58) Madrid, Kingdom of Castile, Crown of Castile

Aleixo de Menezes or Alexeu de Jesu de Meneses (25 January 1559 – 3 May 1617) was a Catholic prelate that served as Archbishop of Goa, Archbishop of Braga and Viceroy of Portugal during the Philippine Dynasty.

== Biographical sketch ==
Aleixo was born on 25 January 1559. His father was Lord Dom Aloysius De Menezes, a famous lord and family member of Kantlhield and his mother Louisa de Norohna. After the initial education, he joined the order of St. Augustine at the age of 15. He studied philosophy, rhetoric, theology and literature from the university of Coimbra. Once, he was offered the status of the rector of the Coimbra academy, but he refused out of humility. Alexi's desire was to work for the pastoral care of souls. Later he was appointed as the chaplain of the Portugal palace. He worked as the prior of the Augustinian monastery in santhralsa and ulsiponi. He was consecrated Archbishop of Goa in 1595, when he was only 35.

As Archbishop of Goa, Menezes focused on strengthening Catholic ascendancy in Portugal. Part of this mission involved bringing the Saint Thomas Christians, an ancient body formerly part of the Church of the East, under the authority of the Catholic Church. By 1597 the last metropolitan bishop of the Saint Thomas Christians, Abraham, had died, and Menezes was able to secure the submission of Archdeacon George, the highest remaining representative of the native church hierarchy. That year Menezes convened the Synod of Diamper, which introduced a number of forcible reforms to the church in order to be bring the Saint Thomas Christians fully into the Latin Church of the Catholic Church. The traditions of the Saint Thomas Christians, created during centuries of maintaining their Christian way of life in a predominantly Hindu and Muslim environment, were disregarded and overturned, and many of their holy writings were condemned as heretical and consigned to the fire.

Following the synod, Menezes consecrated Francis Ros as archbishop of the Archdiocese of Angamalé for the Saint Thomas Christians.

In 1612 Aleixo de Menezes was appointed Archbishop of Braga, Portugal. He was viceroy of Portugal during the Philippine Dynasty from 1612 to 1615. He died in 1617, his remains are located at the Populo Church in Braga, Northern Portugal.

== Controversy ==
Styles of Aleixo de Menezes
- Reference style: His Lordship
- Spoken style: Your Lordship

Aleixo de Menezes, under the authority of the Goa Inquisition and the Council of Trent, continued the latinisation of the St. Thomas Christians started by the Portuguese in the early 16th century.

The result of his Synod of Diamper significantly altered the local rituals. The Catholic Encyclopedia (1913) says:

The only case in which an ancient Eastern rite has been wilfully romanized is that of the Malabar Christians, where it was not Roman authority but the misguided zeal of Alexius de Menezes, Archbishop of Goa, and his Portuguese advisers at the Synod of Diamper (1599) which spoiled the old Malabar Rite.

Nasranis gathered at Mattancherry church on Friday, 3 January 1653 (M.E. 828 Makaram 3), and made an oath that is known as the Great Oath of Bent Cross

The situation is explained by Stephen Neill (an Anglican Protestant missionary, from Scotland) in his book A History of Christianity in India: The Beginnings to AD 1707.

"On [sic] January 1653, priests and people assembled in the church of Our Lady at Mattancherry, and standing in front of a cross and lighted candles swore upon the holy Gospel that they would no longer obey Garcia, and that they would have nothing further to do with the Jesuits they would recognize the Archdeacon as the governor of their Church. This is the famous oath of the "Coonan Cross" (the open-air Cross which stands outside the church at Mattancherry). The Saint Thomas Christians did not at any point suggest that they wished to separate themselves from the Pope. They could no longer tolerate the arrogance of Garcia. And their detestation of the Jesuits, to whose overbearing attitude and lack of sympathy they attributed all their troubles, breathes through all the documents of the time. But let the Pope send them a true bishop not a Jesuit, and they will be pleased to receive and obey him."

Francisco Ros bishop of Angamaly consecrated by Aleixo de Menesis, just after the Synod of Diamper, has mentioned in his letter to Padroado that Archbishop de Menesis added a few additional canons on his own to the Portuguese version of the decrees of synod, which was submitted to Holy See after it ended. The currently available Malayalam version, on which participants signed, lacks 35 of the canons given in the Portuguese text.

== See also ==
- Nasrani
- Malankara Church
