= Marquess of Gouveia =

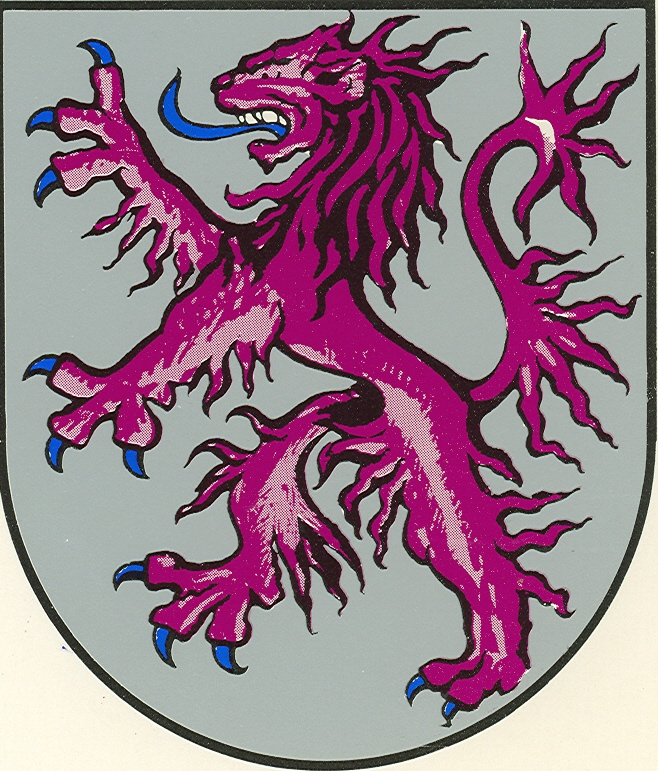
The Coat of Arms of the Silva family, the first to bear the title of Marquis of Gouveia.

Marquess of Gouveia (in Portuguese Marquês de Gouveia) was a Portuguese title of nobility created by King Philip III of Portugal, also known as Philip IV of Spain, by a royal decree dated from January 20, 1625, granted to Manrique da Silva, who already was 6th Count of Portalegre, second male child of the 4th Counts of Portalegre.

The title was extinguished by King Joseph I of Portugal following the Távora affair.

In the late 19th Century, King Charles I of Portugal granted the title of Marquis of Gouveia (as a second creation) to Afonso de Serpa Leitão Freire Pimentel, by a royal decree dated from November 15, 1900 .

== List of the Marquesses of Gouveia ==
=== First creation (1625) ===
1. Manrique da Silva, also 6th Count of Portalegre;
2. João da Silva (c. 1625-1686), also 7th Count of Portalegre;
3. Martinho Mascarenhas, (1681-1723), also 6th Count of Santa Cruz;
4. João Mascarenhas (1699- ? ), also 7th Count of Santa Cruz;
5. José Mascarenhas da Silva e Lencastre (1708-1759), also 8th Count of Santa Cruz and 8th Duke of Aveiro;
6. Martinho Mascarenhas (1740-1805), older male child of the 5th Marquis of Gouveia, he was nicknamed o marquesinho (the little Marquis).

=== Second creation (1900) ===
1. Afonso de Serpa Leitão Freire Pimentel (1848-1930), 1st Count of Gouveia (May 20, 1879, by King Louis I), upgraded to 1st Marquis of Gouveia (November 15, 1900, by King Charles I);
2. Jorge de Serpa Pimentel (1923-1997), also 3rd Baron of São João de Areias;
3. Jorge Paiva Brandão de Serpa Pimentel (born 1958), also 4th Baron of São João de Areias.

== See also ==
- Count of Portalegre
- Count of Santa Cruz
- Duke of Aveiro
