= Navicula de Venetiis =

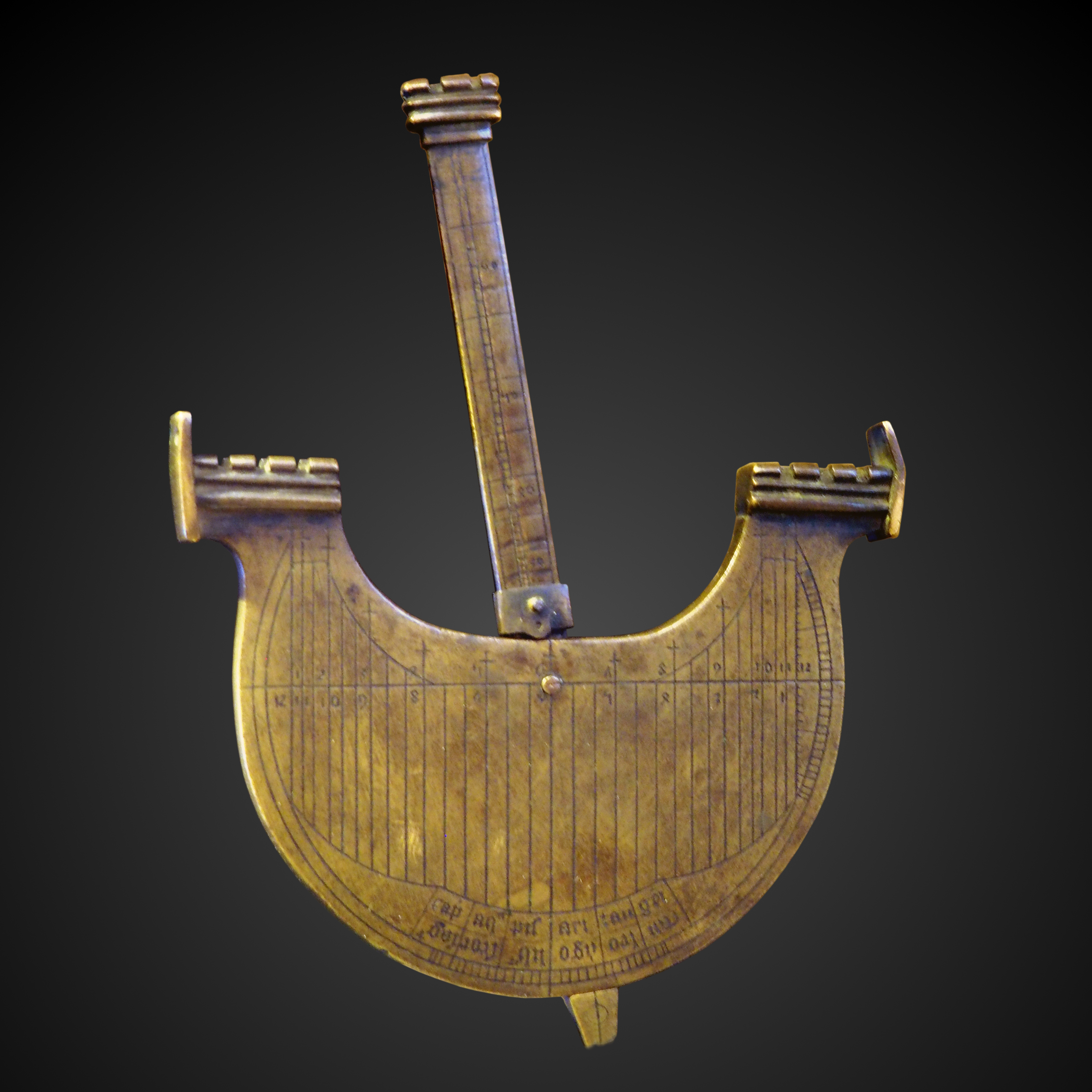
Navicula de Venetiis on display at Musée d'histoire des sciences de la Ville de Genève.

A navicula de Venetiis or "little ship of Venice" was an altitude dial used to tell time and which was shaped like a little ship. The cursor (with a plumb line attached) was slid up/down the mast to the correct latitude. The user then sighted the sun through the pair of sighting holes at either end of the "ship's deck". The plumb line then marked what hour of the day it was. Some naviculas had additional information inscribed, such as the latitude of some common English towns, some zodiac signs, etc.
