= Count of Santa Cruz =

Portuguese title of nobility

Count of Santa Cruz (in Portuguese Conde de Santa Cruz) was a Portuguese title of nobility created by a royal decree of King Philip II of Portugal, also known as Philip III of Spain, dated from October 3, 1593, and granted to Francisco de Mascarenhas (1530-1608), nephew of Dom Pedro de Mascarenhas, 6th Viceroy of Portuguese India.

Through a remarkable marriage policy, this family inherited several other titles and estates, such as Marquess of Gouveia in 1686, and Duke of Aveiro in 1745.

== List of the counts ==
1. Francisco de Mascarenhas (1530–1608), 1st Count of Vila da Horta and 13th Viceroy of Portuguese India;
2. Martinho Mascarenhas (1570–?), 2nd Count of Santa Cruz;
3. Beatriz Mascarenhas (1610–? ), 3rd Countess of Santa Cruz. She married a distant cousin, João de Mascarenhas (1600-1668), who became 3rd Count of Santa Cruz by marriage;
4. Martinho Mascarenhas (1630–1676), 4th Count of Santa Cruz;
5. João Mascarenhas (1650–1691), 5th Count of Santa Cruz;
6. Martinho Mascarenhas (1681–1723), 6th Count of Santa Cruz and 3rd Marquess of Gouveia;
7. João Mascarenhas (1699–?), 7th Count of Santa Cruz and 4th Marquess of Gouveia, forced to renounce the title after fleeing Portugal for adultery, he chose to live maritally with his mother;
8. José Mascarenhas da Silva e Lencastre (1708–1759), 8th Count of Santa Cruz, 5th Marquess of Gouveia and 8th Duke of Aveiro;
9. Martinho Mascarenhas (1740–1804), 9th Count of Santa Cruz and 6th Marquess of Gouveia. The last Count of Santa Cruz before the title was extinct following the Távora affair.

== See also ==
- Marquess of Gouveia
- Duke of Aveiro
- Távora affair

== Count and Marquis of Santa Cruz (Brazilian title) ==
During the Brazilian Empire, there was also a title of Count of Santa Cruz, later upgraded to Marquis of Santa Cruz, granted to Romualdo António de Seixas (1787-1860), and it should not be confused with this Portuguese title.
