= Diogo de Castro =

Portuguese nobleman and politician

Diogo de Castro, 2nd Count of Basto (Évora, 1562 – Évora, 1639) was a Portuguese nobleman and politician, who served as viceroy of Portugal between 1633 and 1634. Son of Fernando de Castro, 1st Count of Basto, Diogo inherited this title from his father.

He began his military career at the Battle of Alcácer Quibir, where he was captured by the Arabs, but he was subsequently released by the intervention of the King of Spain, Philip II, whom Castro began to support in the War of the Portuguese Succession. Castro participated in the Conquest of the Azores, which meant Philip's victory in the war.

He served as president of the courts Casa da Suplicação and Desembargo do Paço.

He was a member of the boards of government of the Viceroyalty of Portugal and was elected in 1633 as penultimate Viceroy of Portugal. During his rule, an attempt was made to regain Spanish might in Portugal, but Castro resigned quickly after opposing authoritarianism of the Count-Duke of Olivares.

After failing in a mediation attempt during the Manuelinho Revolt, Castro died in his hometown as he prepared to travel to Madrid to discuss the future of Portugal. Soon after, the Portuguese Restoration War broke out.
