= Fernando Martins Mascarenhas =

Portuguese scholar, theologian and church leader

His Lordship D. Fernando Martins Mascarenhas
- Bishop of Faro, Inquisitor General of Portugal
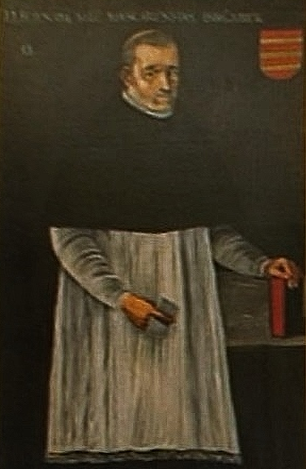
- Church: Catholic Church
- Diocese: Diocese of Faro
- Appointed: 3 January 1594
- Retired: 4 June 1616
- Predecessor: Francisco Cano
- Successor: João Coutinho
- Other post: Inquisitor General (1616–1628)

Orders
- Consecration: 5 February 1595 by Miguel de Castro

Personal details
- Born: Fernando Martins Mascarenhas c. 1548 Montemor-o-Novo, Portugal
- Died: 20 January 1628 (aged 79–80)
- Parents: D. Vasco Mascarenhas; D. Maria de Mendonça
- Education: University of Évora

Fernando Martins Mascarenhas (otherwise referred to as Fernão Martins Mascarenhas; c. 1548 – 20 January 1628) was a Portuguese scholar, theologian, and church leader. King Philip I appointed him Rector of the University of Coimbra and, later, Bishop of Faro; he later resigned to take up the post of Inquisitor General of Portugal.

== Biography ==
Fernão Martins de Mascarenhas was born in Montemor-o-Novo, Alentejo, the second-born of D. Vasco Mascarenhas, Keeper of the Wardrobe (Reposteiro-mor) of Prince John (son of King John III), and Maria de Mendonça. He studied Philosophy in the University of Évora, earning the degree of Artium Magister and, later, a doctorate in Theology from the University of Coimbra as a student (porcionista) in the Royal College of Saint Paul.

On 15 May 1586, he was made Rector of the University of Coimbra by decree of King Philip I. On 3 January 1594 he was nominated Bishop of Faro, a vacant see since the death of his predecessor, Francisco Cano; he was consecrated by Miguel de Castro, Archbishop of Lisbon, in the Lisbon Cathedral, on 5 February 1595.

As bishop, he was highly regarded for his charity. During his episcopate, the Algarve endured a plague outbreak, and Bishop Mascarenhas assisted the sick with great commitment; when Vila Nova de Portimão faced a terrible famine, he had all the wheat in his granary distributed amongst the populace. In 1599, he established the Jesuit College in Portimão and, in 1607, he donated large sums to help build the Capuchin Convent of Saint Anthony in Tavira.

On 4 July 1616 he was made Inquisitor General by papal brief of Pope Paul V, and took office on 15 December. He accumulated this post with that of Councilor of State, and of Lord Prior of the Collegiate Church of Our Lady of the Olive Tree in Guimarães. He was offered the Sees of Coimbra and of Lisbon, but he refused.

His remains are buried in the chancel of the Church of Saint Roch, in Lisbon.
