= Afonso Furtado de Mendonça =

Portuguese prelate

His Grace Afonso Furtado de Mendonça
- Archbishop of Lisbon
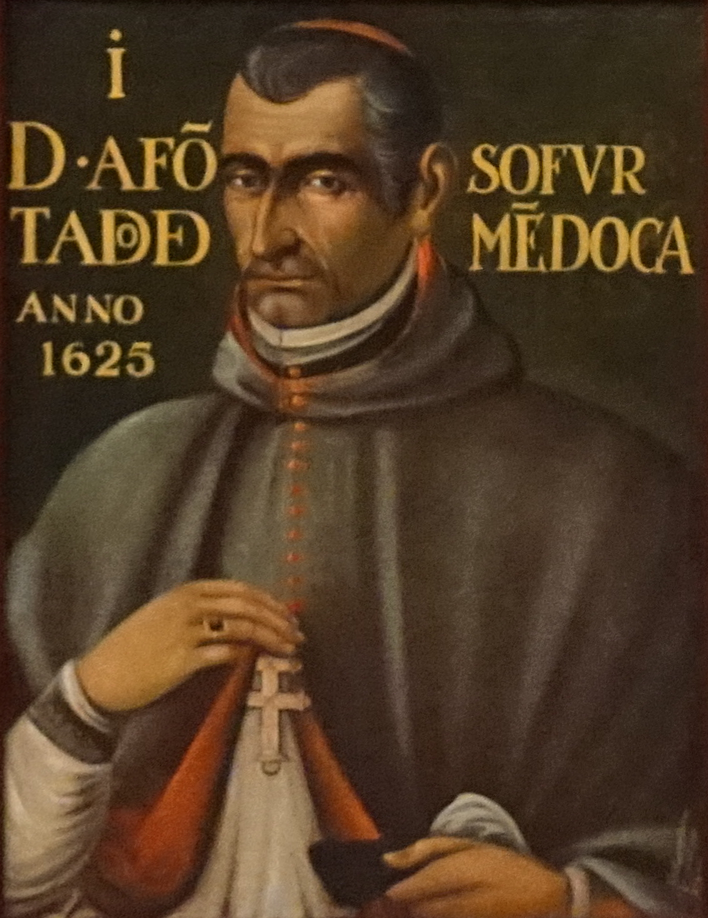
- Church: Roman Catholic Church
- Archdiocese: Lisbon
- See: Cathedral of St. Mary Major
- Installed: 2 December 1626
- Term ended: 2 June 1630
- Predecessor: Miguel de Castro
- Successor: João Manuel de Ataíde
- Other posts: Archbishop of Braga (1618–26) Bishop of Guarda (1609–16); Bishop of Coimbra (1616–18)

Personal details
- Born: 1561 Montemor-o-Novo, Portugal
- Died: 2 June 1630 Lisbon, Portugal
- Buried: Patriarchal Cathedral, Lisbon
- Education: University of Coimbra

D. Afonso Furtado de Mendonça (Montemor-o-Novo, 1561 - Lisbon, 2 June 1630) was a Portuguese prelate, who was for five years Bishop of Guarda, two years Bishop of Coimbra, seven years Archbishop of Braga, and four years of Lisbon, in whose cathedral, in the main chapel, he was buried.

== Biography ==
D. Afonso was the son of Jorge Furtado de Mendonça, Commander of the Entries, of Patterns and of the Dam in the Order of Santiago, and of his wife D. Mécia Henriques.

He made his first studies in Lisbon and confirmed them in Coimbra, according to the Bibliotheca Lusitana, Tomo I, page 36. Graduated from the University of Coimbra with his Doctorate in the Faculty of Canons, he was admitted to the College of Saint Peter on 10 May 1592, where he became the rector of the same university in 1597. Philip II of Portugal nominated him, in January 1605, Councilor of State in the Council of Portugal. In 1608 he was elected President of the Bureau of Conscience and Orders.

He was appointed Bishop of Guarda in August 1609, taking office on 13 February 1610, where he "took away the pernicious roots of many abuses and introduced the sacred ordinances of the Council of Trent". Then elevated to the See of Coimbra by Pope Paul V's bull, passed on 5 December 1615.

Varying the Priory Mithra of Braga by the death of D. Frei Aleixo de Meneses, in 1618, D. Afonso was named successor as Archbishop of Braga.

He was appointed Archbishop of Lisbon in January 1626, confirmed by Pope Urban VIII on December 3 of that same year, being until his death on 2 June 1630. He was also created one of the Governors of the Kingdom, along with Diogo de Castro, Count de Basto, and Diogo da Silva, Count of Portalegre, a post he held from 13 September 1623 until shortly before his death.
