= João Manuel de Ataíde =

Portuguese prelate, Archbishop of Lisbon and Viceroy of Portugal

His Excellency João Manuel de Ataíde
- Archbishop of Lisbon, Viceroy of Portugal
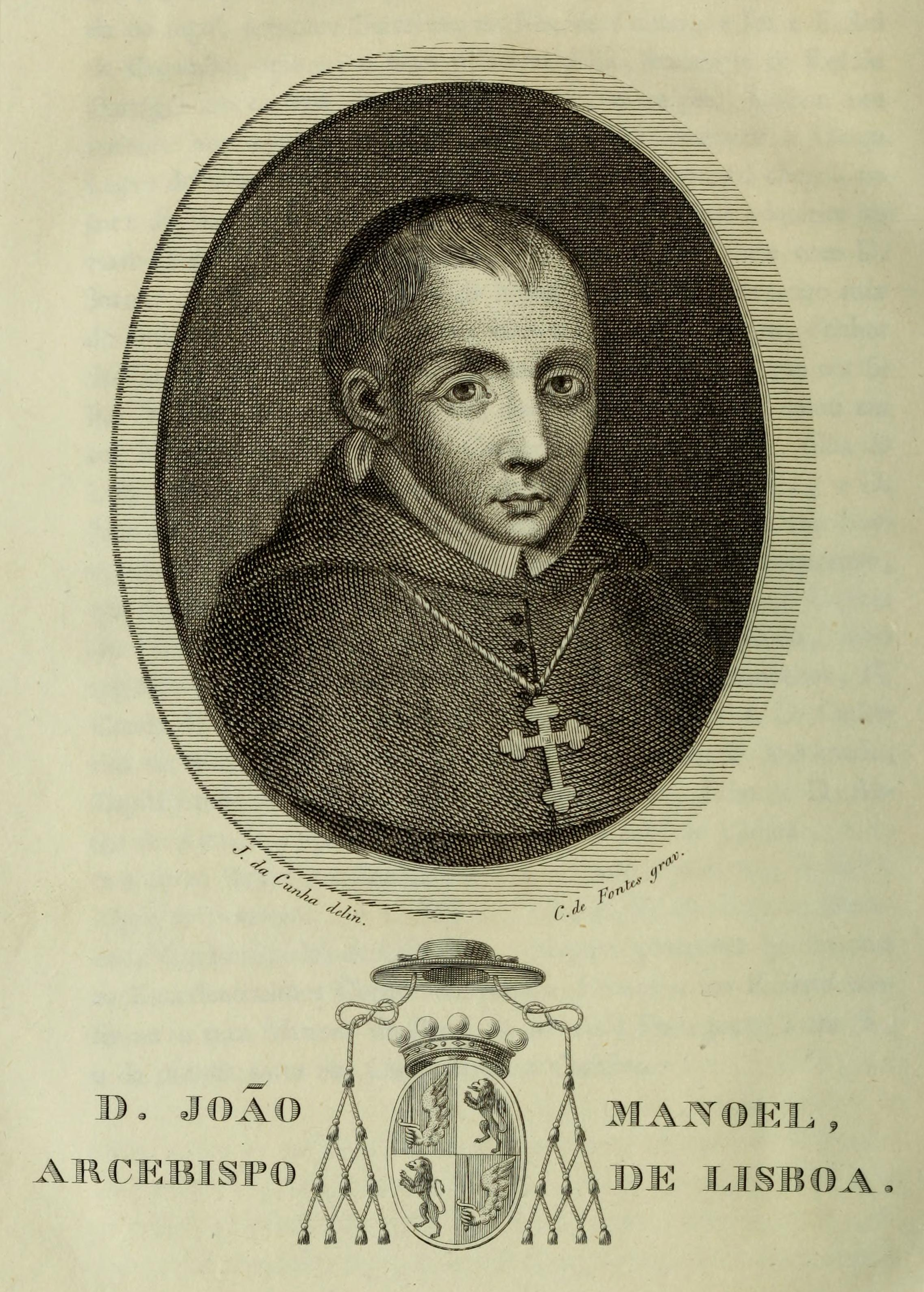
- Church: Roman Catholic Church
- Archdiocese: Lisbon
- See: Cathedral of St. Mary Major
- Installed: 24 November 1632
- Term ended: 4 July 1633
- Predecessor: Afonso Furtado de Mendonça
- Successor: Rodrigo da Cunha
- Other posts: Bishop of Viseu (1609–25); Bishop of Coimbra (1625–32)

Personal details
- Born: 1570 Lisbon, Portugal
- Died: 4 July 1633 (aged 62–63) Lisbon, Portugal
- Education: University of Coimbra (Th.D.)

D. John Manuel of Athanagilds, 9th Count of Arganil (Portuguese Archaic: João Manoel de Ataíde; Lisbon, 1570 – Lisbon, 4 July 1633) was a Portuguese prelate, Archbishop of Lisbon and Viceroy of Portugal.

== Biography ==
He was the fifth son of Nuno Manuel, grandson of bastardy by D. Duarte I, and D. Joana de Athayde. He received his doctorate in Theology from the University of Coimbra, and soon after was appointed canon of the See of Lisbon. Later he was appointed chief almoner of Philip II of Portugal when, in 1609, was invited to be Bishop of Viseu, taking possession of the diocese on 25 April 1610. After vacating the seat of Bishop of Guarda in 1615, he was invited to exercise that prelature, but refused. In 1625, he was transferred to the Diocese of Coimbra, thus being made Count of Arganil, the title given to Bishops of Coimbra, and bishop on May 26.

In 1632, he was appointed Archbishop of Lisbon, having his ascension confirmed in 1633 by Pope Urban VIII. King Philip III appointed him Viceroy of Portugal on 26 March 1633, and his inauguration as such on May 12. According to orders of the King, he could not make any visit and for the ecclesiastical visits, he should be accompanied by guards. By these orders, he was admitted to the Archdiocese of Lisbon by proxy, with his procurator D. Gaspar do Rêgo. He did not receive the pallium, for he died on 4 July 1633.
