= Francisco de Mascarenhas =

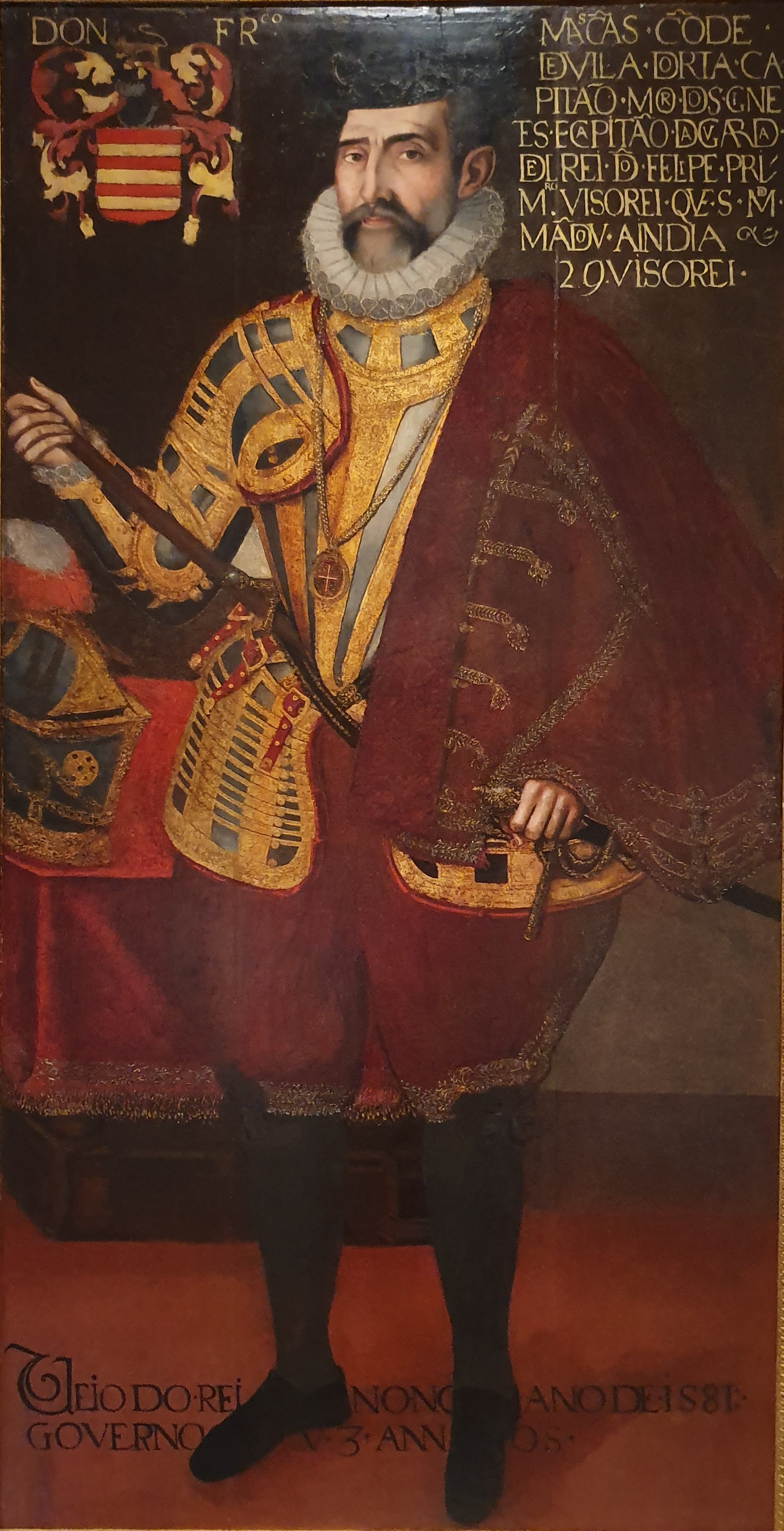

Viceroy of Portuguese India
- In office 1581–1584
- Monarch: Philip I
- Preceded by: Fernão Teles de Meneses
- Succeeded by: Duarte de Meneses

Personal details
- Born: 1530 Kingdom of Portugal
- Died: 4 September 1608

D. Francisco de Mascarenhas, 1st Count of Vila da Horta and 1st Count of Santa Cruz (1530 – 4 September 1608) was a Portuguese nobleman and colonial administrator who was the 13th viceroy of India from 1581 to 1584. He was also a donatary captain of the islands of Flores and Corvo.

== Titles ==
The Count of Vila da Horta was a title created by Philip I of Portugal in 1580 in favour of Francisco. The first count was lost the captaincy of the island of Faial and demanded with the Royal Family, Philip I substituted the title with the count of Santa Cruz conceded the title as a captaincy of donatary in the islands of Corvo and Flores.

Count of Santa Cruz (in Portuguese Conde de Santa Cruz) was a Portuguese title of nobility created by a royal decree of King Philip I of Portugal, dated from October 3, 1593, and granted to Francisco de Mascarenhas (1530-1608), nephew of Dom Pedro de Mascarenhas, 6th Viceroy of Portuguese India.

Through a remarkable marriage policy, this family inherited several other titles and estates, such as Marquis of Gouveia in 1686, and Duke of Aveiro in 1745.

== Early career in India ==
D. Francisco started his career in Portuguese India in 1555, with his uncle the vice-roy Pedro Mascarenhas (1554-1555). He was the general that vice-roy Dom Luís de Ataíde (1568-1571) appointed to face the forces of the Ahmadnagar Sultan at Portuguese Chaul in 1570-71. He became famous for this military success to an extent that Philip II of Spain decided to appoint him as vice-roy of India, in 1581, to succeed earl D. Luís de Ataíde in his second government of Asia (1578-1581). He was mainly tasked with ensuring that Philip II would be accepted as King of Portugal in Portuguese Asia.

== Later career ==
After a successful government in India, between 1581 and 1584, D. Francisco returned to his estates in Portugal. In 1593, when cardinal Albert VII, Archduke of Austria left the viceroyalty of Portugal, Philip II of Spain, appointed D. Francisco was one of the five governors of Portugal. He ruled Portugal until the next vice-roy of Portugal was named by Philip III of Spain.

== Bibliography ==
A Casa de Atouguia, os Últimos Avis e o Império: Dinâmicas entrecruzadas na carreira de D. Luís de Ataíde (1516 - 1581)

Virtual Encyclopedia of the Portuguese Expansion Articles 2008-2018. D. Francisco Mascarenhas pages 31 – 34

Preceded by Fernão Teles de Menezes	13th Viceroy of Portuguese India; 1581-1584	Succeeded by Duarte de Menezes, 14th Viceroy of India
