= List of Portuguese cardinals =

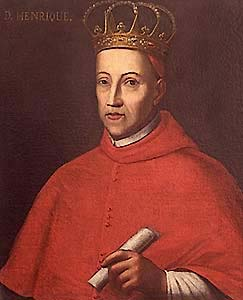
Henry of Portugal, both cardinal and King of Portugal

The following is a list of Portuguese cardinals in the Roman Catholic Church, ordered by years of consistory.

Throughout history, 46 Portuguese prelates were elevated to the cardinalate. This list includes 5 cardinal bishops, 36 cardinal priests and 5 cardinal deacons.

Two Portuguese cardinals ascended to the Papal and Portuguese thrones, respectively: Pedro Hispano was elected Pope in 1276, under the name of John XXI, and Cardinal Henry of Portugal was acclaimed King of Portugal in 1578.

#	Picture	Name	Lifespan	Consistories and titles	Coat of Arms
1		Gil Júlio Rebolo (Magister Egidius)	13th century	Pope Innocent III; Cardinal-Deacon (title unknown)	
2		Paio Galvão	1165–1230 († 65 years)	1205 Pope Innocent III; Cardinal deacon of Santa Lucia in Silice; 1210 Pope Innocent III; Cardinal priest of Santa Cecilia in Trastevere; 1212 Pope Innocent III cardinal bishop of Albano	
3		Pedro Julião, later Pope John XXI	1215–1277 († 62 years)	1273 Pope Gregory X Cardinal bishop of Frascati (1273–1276)	
4		Pedro da Fonseca	14th century–1422	1409 Antipope Benedict XIII; 1419 Pope Martin V Cardinal deacon of Sant'Angelo in Pescheria	
5		João Afonso Esteves de Azambuja	1340–1415 († 75 years)	1411 Pope Gregory XII; Cardinal priest of San Pietro in Vincoli	
6		Antão Martins de Chaves	?–1447	1439 Pope Eugene IV; Cardinal priest of San Crisogono	
7		Infante Jaime of Portugal	1433–1459 († 25 years)	1456 Pope Calixtus III; Cardinal deacon of Sant'Eustachio	
8		Jorge da Costa (Cardinal de Alpedrinha)	1406–1508 († 102 years)	1476 (in pectore); 1476 Pope Sixtus IV (revealed); Cardinal priest of Santi Marcellino e Pietro al Laterano; 1491 Pope Innocent VIII; Cardinal bishop of Albano	
9		Infante Afonso of Portugal	1509–1540 († 30 years)	1517 Pope Leo X Cardinal deacon (no title assigned); 1525 Pope Clement VII; Cardinal deacon of Santa Lucia in Septisolio; 1535 Pope Paul III; Cardinal priest of Santi Giovanni e Paolo al Celio	
10		Miguel da Silva	1480–1556 († 76 years)	1539 (in pectore); 1541 Pope Paul III (revealed); Cardinal priest of Santa Maria in Trastevere	
11		Infante Henry of Portugal, later King Henry I of Portugal	1512–1580 († 68 years)	1545 Pope Paul III; Cardinal priest of Santi Quattro Coronati	
12		Veríssimo de Lencastre (Cardinal de Lencastre)	1615–1692 († 77 years)	1686 Pope Innocent XI; Cardinal priest (no title assigned)	
13		Luís de Sousa	1630–1702 († 71 years)	1697 Pope Innocent XII; Cardinal priest (no title assigned)	
14		Nuno da Cunha e Ataíde	1664–1750 († 85 years)	1712 Pope Clement XI; Cardinal priest of Sant'Anastasia	
15		José Pereira de Lacerda	1662–1738 († 76 years)	1719 Pope Clement XI; Cardinal priest of Santa Susanna	
16		João da Mota e Silva (Cardinal da Mota)	1685–1747 († 62 years)	1727 Pope Benedict XIII; Cardinal priest (no title assigned)	
17		Tomás de Almeida	1670–1754 († 83 years)	1737 Pope Clement XII; Cardinal priest (no title assigned)	
18		José Manuel da Câmara de Atalaia	1686–1758 († 71 years)	1747 Pope Benedict XIV; Cardinal priest (no title assigned)	
19		Francisco de Saldanha da Gama	1723–1776 († 53 years)	1756 Pope Benedict XIV; Cardinal deacon (no title assigned); 1759 Pope Clement XIII; Cardinal priest (no title assigned)	
20		Paulo António de Carvalho e Mendonça	1702–1770 († 68 years)	1769 (in pectore); 1770 Pope Clement XIV (revealed); Cardinal deacon (no title assigned)	
21		Friar João Cosme da Cunha; OCSA (Cardinal da Cunha)	1715–1783 († 67 years)	1770 Pope Clement XIV; Cardinal priest (no title assigned)	
22		Fernando de Sousa e Silva	1712–1786 († 68 years)	1778 Pope Pius VI; Cardinal priest (no title assigned)	
23		José Francisco Miguel António de Mendonça	1725–1808 († 82 years)	1788 Pope Pius VI; Cardinal priest (no title assigned)	
24		Miguel Carlos José de Noronha e Silva Abranches	1744–1803 († 58 years)	1803 Pope Pius VII; Cardinal deacon (no title assigned)	
25		Carlos da Cunha e Meneses	1759–1825 († 82 years)	1819 Pope Pius VII; Cardinal priest (no title assigned)	
26		Friar Patrício da Silva; OESA	1756–1840 († 83 years)	1824 Pope Leo XII; Cardinal priest (no title assigned)	
27		Friar Francisco de São Luís Saraiva; OSB (Cardinal Saraiva)	1766–1845 († 79 years)	1843 Pope Gregory XVI; Cardinal priest (no title assigned)	
28		Guilherme Henriques de Carvalho	1793–1857 († 64 years)	1846 Pope Gregory XVI; Cardinal priest of Santa Maria sopra Minerva	
29		Pedro Paulo de Figueiredo da Cunha e Melo	1770–1855 († 85 years)	1850 Pope Pius IX; Cardinal priest (no title assigned)	
30		Manuel Bento Rodrigues da Silva; CSJE	1800–1869 († 68 years)	1858 Pope Pius IX; Cardinal priest (no title assigned)	
31		Inácio do Nascimento Morais Cardoso	1811–1883 († 71 years)	1873 Pope Pius IX; Cardinal priest of Santi Nereo e Achilleo	
32		Américo Ferreira dos Santos Silva	1829–1899 († 70 years)	1879 Pope Leo XIII; Cardinal priest of Santi Quattro Coronati	
33		Friar José Sebastião de Almeida Neto; OFM	1841–1920 († 79 years)	1884 Pope Leo XIII; Cardinal priest of Santi XII Apostoli	
34		António Mendes Bello	1842–1929 († 87 years)	1911 (in pectore); 1914 Pope Pius X (revealed); Cardinal priest of Santi Marcellino e Pietro	
35		Manuel Gonçalves Cerejeira (Cardinal Cerejeira)	1888–1977 († 88 years)	1929 Pope Pius XI; Cardinal priest of Santi Marcellino e Pietro	
36		Teodósio Clemente de Gouveia	1889–1962 († 72 years)	1946 Pope Pius XII; Cardinal priest of San Pietro in Vincoli	
37		José da Costa Nunes	1880–1976 († 96 years)	1962 Pope John XXIII; Cardinal priest of Santa Prisca	
38		António Ribeiro	1928–1998 († 69 years)	1973 Pope Paul VI; Cardinal priest of Sant'Antonio da Padova in Via Merulana	
39		Humberto Sousa Medeiros	1915–1983 († 67 years)	1973 Pope Paul VI; Cardinal priest of Santa Susanna	
40		José Saraiva Martins; CMF	1932 (94 years)	2001 Pope John Paul II; Cardinal deacon of Nostra Signora del Sacro Cuore; 2009 Pope Benedict XVI; Cardinal bishop of Palestrina	
41		José da Cruz Policarpo	1936–2014 († 78 years)	2001 Pope John Paul II; Cardinal priest of Sant'Antonio in Campo Marzio	
42		Manuel Monteiro de Castro	1938 (88 years)	2012 Pope Benedict XVI; Cardinal deacon de San Domenico di Guzmán; 2012 Pope Francis; Cardinal priest of San Domenico di Guzmán pro hac vice	
43		Manuel José Macário do Nascimento Clemente	1948 (78 years)	2015 Pope Francis; Cardinal priest of Sant'Antonio in Campo Marzio	
44		António Augusto dos Santos Marto	1947 (79 years)	2018 Pope Francis; Cardinal priest of Santa Maria sopra Minerva	
45		José Tolentino Calaça de Mendonça	1965 (60 years)	2019 Pope Francis; Cardinal deacon of Santi Domenico e Sisto	
46		Américo Manuel Alves Aguiar	1973 (52 years)	2023 Francisco; Cardinal priest of Sant'Antonio da Padova in Via Merulana	
