= Francisco Rodrigues da Cruz =

Portuguese Catholic priest (1859–1948)

Servant of God Francisco Rodrigues da Cruz SJ
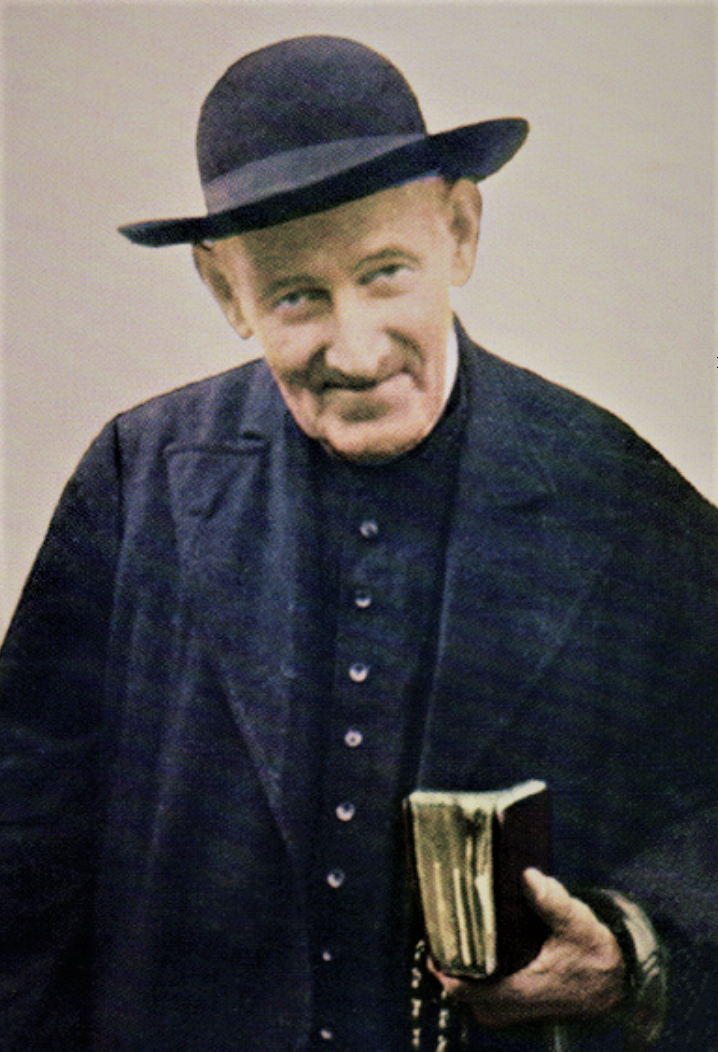
- Church: Roman Catholic Church

Orders
- Ordination: 3 June 1882

Personal details
- Born: 29 July 1859 Alcochete, Kingdom of Portugal
- Died: 1 October 1948 (aged 89) Lisbon, Second Portuguese Republic
- Buried: Benfica Cemetery
- Residence: Caldas Palace (from 1927)
- Education: University of Coimbra

Francisco Rodrigues da Cruz, SJ (29 July 1859 – 1 October 1948), more commonly known as Father Cruz (Portuguese: Padre Cruz) was a Portuguese Catholic priest. Revered in Portugal for his apostolic fervor and charity, he visited prisons and hospitals in every city, gave alms to the poor and ministered spiritually to all, achieving a great reputation for sanctity. Some called him "Blessed Father Cruz" and "Apostle of Charity" still in his lifetime.

Cruz expressed a desire to enter the Society of Jesus as early as 1880, but was unsuccessful; the Superior General of the Jesuits obtained permission first from Pope Pius XI in 1929 to allow Cruz to take vows as a Jesuit on his death bed, and then from Pope Pius XII in 1940 to take vows immediately and without the need to undergo a novitiate or of residing in a Jesuit community. He did pronounce his vows at the Costa Seminary in Guimarães on 3 December 1940 (the feast of Saint Francis Xavier, to whom he had great devotion).

Cruz was the first priest to openly preach devotion to Our Lady of Fátima, at a time when most of the Portuguese clergy was still uneasy to show any sentiments favourable to the apparitions; this was before the Bishop of Leiria, José Alves Correia da Silva, recognised them as worthy of belief in 1930.

The cause for his beatification was officially opened in 1951 and its diocesan phase took place until 1965; due to changes in the norms of beatification processes, a suppletory process was opened in the Patriarchate of Lisbon in September 2009 and was formally closed on 17 December 2020. The cause is now before the Congregation for the Causes of Saints.

== Early life ==
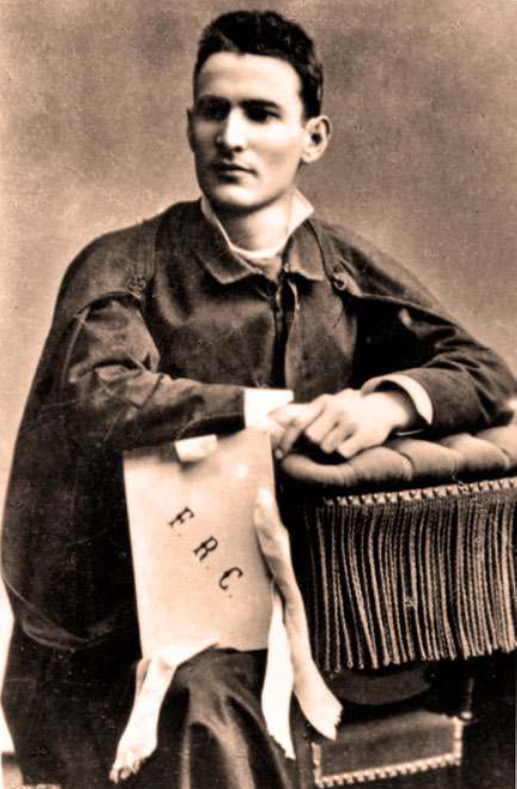
Francisco Rodrigues da Cruz as a student in the University of Coimbra, 1880

Francisco Rodrigues da Cruz was born in Alcochete at 10 p.m. on 29 July 1859, the fourth son of Manuel da Cruz and Catarina Maria de Oliveira. Due to the apparent frailty of the newborn and fearing imminent death, Francisco had an emergency baptism at home, by the parish coadjutor Francisco Gomes da Rosa. The baptismal rites were only concluded on the next 25 February, in the Parish Church of Saint John the Baptist, when Manuel Teixeira Salgueiro anointed him with the oil of catechumens and pronounced the exorcism.

Francisco Rodrigues da Cruz was born less than a week before the death of John Vianney; some authors have drawn parallels between the two.

After concluding his secondary education in Lisbon, as he had expressed an interest in becoming a priest, his father sent him at age 16 to attend the Faculty of Theology of the University of Coimbra; he concluded his licentiate degree in 1880, aged 21. Shortly afterwards, the Cardinal-Patriarch Inácio do Nascimento de Morais Cardoso had him teaching philosophy in the Patriarchal Seminary in Santarém; he was ordained on 3 June 1882.

A nervous breakdown prevented him from continuing to teach. In 1886 he was invited instead to direct the College of Saint Cajetan (Colégio de São Caetano), an orphan school in Braga; for similar reasons he asked to be replaced in this position by the Salesian Fathers in 1894. From then until 1903, he acted as spiritual director of the minor seminary in Lisbon, in the Monastery of St. Vincent Outside the Walls.

== Apostle of Charity ==
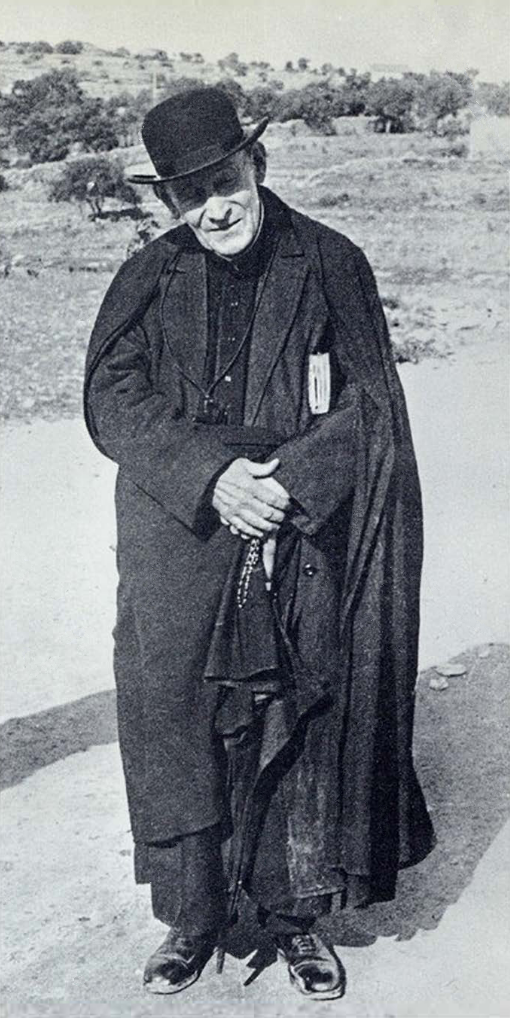
Father Cruz in Fátima, in 1939

Cruz had a reputation for sanctity from a young age: an 1894 letter from his successor as Director of the College of Saint Cajetan, Pietro Cogliolo, to Michele Rua described Cruz as being "of such virtue that people in Braga call him 'the Blessed Father'." Msgr. António Paulo Marques relates that as early as 1909, people took small pieces of cloth from his cassock and kept them as relics.

With a missionary zeal for the salvation of souls, Cruz became famous for tirelessly travelling from parish to parish throughout Portugal, at the invitation of the local parish priests, to pray, to preach, and to bless. His favourite ministry was with the poor and needy, the sick, and the imprisoned. He was a constant presence in the country's hospitals, sanatoriums and prisons, distributing spiritual and material alms, and carried out this "continuous pilgrimage" until 1947, aged 88.

Among his diocesan responsibilities, he was entrusted with the preparation of the Cardinal-Patriarch's pastoral visits; for this reason he earned the moniker of "Saint John the Precursor". In 1925, Cardinal-Patriarch António Mendes Belo (who had selected Cruz as his confessor), wished to appoint him a canon of the Patriarchal Cathedral; Cruz's reply came in a letter, thanking Belo and the Cathedral Chapter for the honour and — while ultimately expressing a submission to the Cardinal's will — telling him that he felt it was the Lord's wish that he continued to minister to the wretched all around Portugal, spiritually helping "the sick, the imprisoned in the jails, the poor and abandoned, and all those sinners and forsaken souls that Our Lord sends my way". The Cardinal agreed.

Cruz is credited with the conversions of notable people in Portuguese society, such as the philosopher Leonardo Coimbra (1883–1936), Councillor Luís de Magalhães (1859–1935), and leading syndicalist activist Manuel Ribeiro (1878–1941).

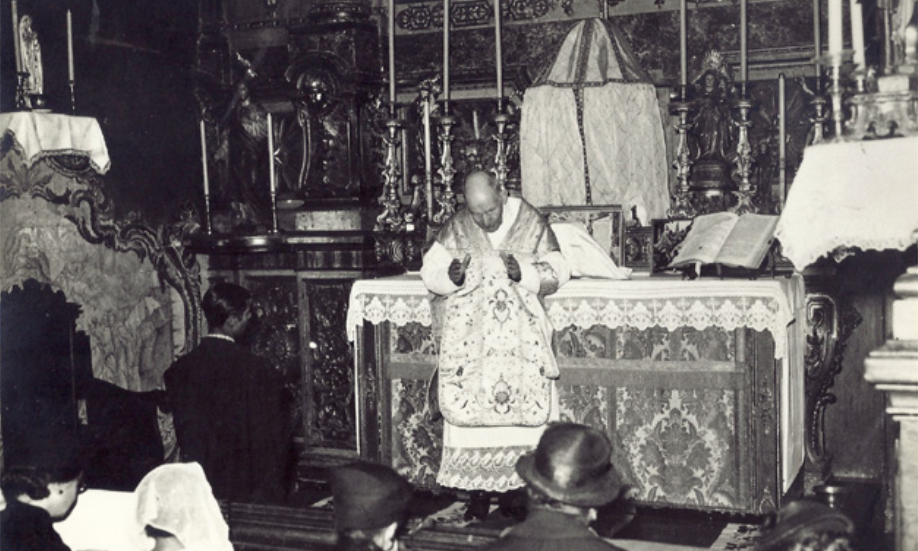
The elderly Father Cruz celebrating Mass in the private chapel of the Mmes. Caldas, in Lisbon, Portugal

Cruz was in Vila Nova de Ourém in 1913 to preach at a First Communion Mass. He was the priest who persuaded the local parish priest to permit six-year-old Lúcia dos Santos, one of the three shepherd children who claimed to have witnessed Marian apparitions in Fátima in 1917, to receive Holy Communion after he had made sure that she knew her catechism exceptionally well and had a good understanding of the faith even though she fell short of the age requirement. He was also the priest who told Lucia and her two cousins, Francisco and Jacinta Marto, four years later in June 1917: "Be assured, have no fear; it was not a devil who appeared to you but the Holy Virgin" when he was asked by the parish priest to question them about the apparitions and to set them straight.

In 1942, at age 83, he visited Madeira and the Azores at the request of the respective ordinaries.

In August 1947, at age 88, he was still travelling across Portugal in his apostolic mission. In December of that year, he fell gravely ill with bronchopneumonia and was bedridden for almost a year; he finally died on 1 October 1948 of a myocardial infarction, clutching a holy card of the Most Sacred Heart of Jesus and the large rosary he always carried around. His funeral was held at Lisbon Cathedral, presided by Cardinal-Patriarch Manuel Gonçalves Cerejeira, who said in his sermon: "The blessed Father Cruz will remain one of the purest glories of our patriarchate. The clergy of Lisbon will always venerate him as a striking example of an apostolate worker, of a priest totally consecrated to the glory of God and the salvation of souls. In him they will find a model and an advocate."

Cruz was interred in the Cemitery of Benfica, in Lisbon; the mausoleum is the site of a popular pilgrimage on the dates of his birth, of his death, and of All Souls' Day.
