= António Barroso =

Portuguese missionary and prelate (1854-1918)

Venerable António Barroso GCC GCNSC
- Bishop of Porto
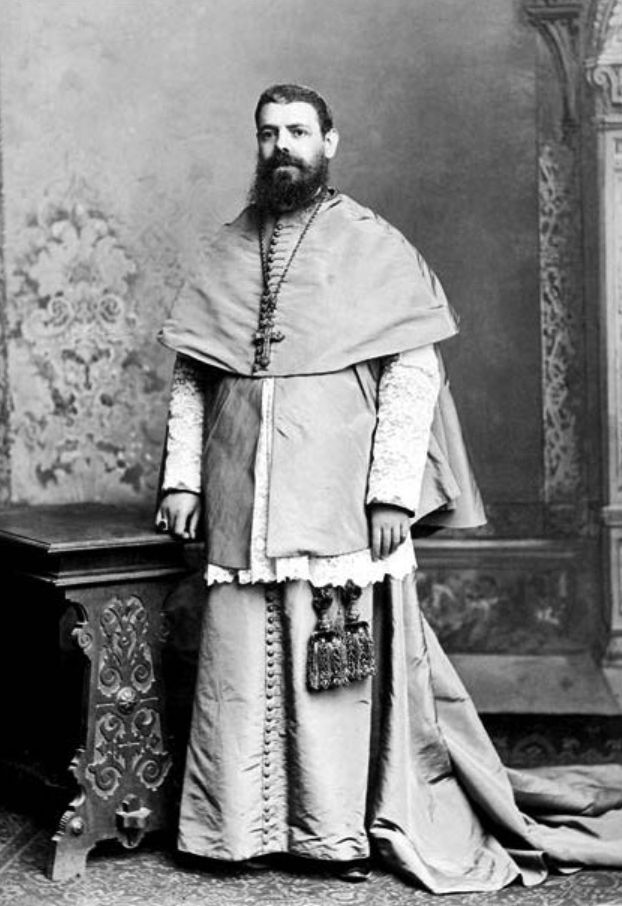
- Church: Roman Catholic Church
- Diocese: Porto
- Appointed: 23 May 1899
- Predecessor: Américo Ferreira dos Santos Silva
- Successor: António Barbosa Leão
- Previous posts: Prelate of Mozambique (1891–1897); Bishop of Saint Thomas of Mylapore (1897–1899)

Orders
- Ordination: 20 September 1879 by José Maria da Silva Ferrão de Carvalho Martens
- Consecration: 5 July 1891 by José Sebastião de Almeida Neto

Personal details
- Born: António José de Sousa Barroso; 5 November 1854 Remelhe, Barcelos, Portugal
- Died: 31 August 1918 (aged 63) Porto, Portugal
- Coat of arms

António José de Sousa Barroso GCC GCNSC (5 November 1854 – 31 August 1918) was a Portuguese missionary and prelate of the Catholic Church, who was Prelate of Mozambique from 1891 to 1897, Bishop of Saint Thomas of Mylapore from 1897 to 1899, and thence Bishop of Porto until his death.

The cause for Borroso's beatification was opened in 1992 by Archbishop Júlio Tavares Rebimbas. In June 2017, Pope Francis recognized a decree from the Congregation for the Causes of Saints stating that Barroso lived a life of heroic virtue and he is now referred to as venerable.

== Distinctions ==
=== National orders ===
- Grand Cross of the Order of Christ
- Grand Cross of the Order of the Immaculate Conception of Vila Viçosa (1886)
