= Luiza Andaluz =

Portuguese religious sister (1877–1973))

Venerable Luiza Andaluz
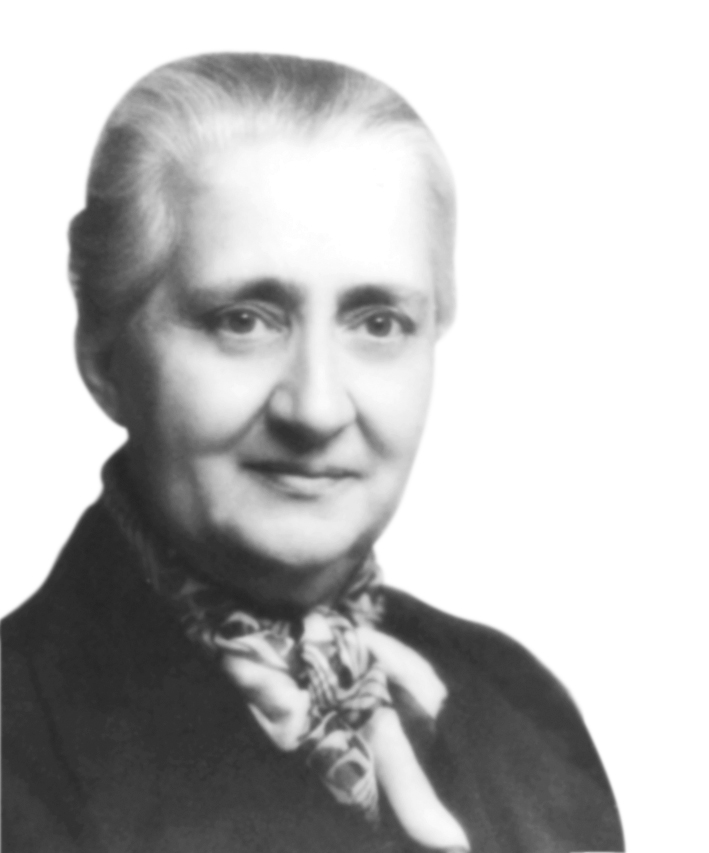
- Born: 12 February 1877
- Died: 20 August 1973; Lisbon

Luisa Andaluz (12 February 1877 – 20 August 1973) was a Portuguese religious sister and the founder of the Congregation of the Servants of Our Lady of Fátima. She was declared venerable by the Catholic Church.

== Life ==
Luisa Andaluz came from a deeply religious family. At the age of 14, Cardinal José Sebastião de Almeida Neto, moved by the young girl's faith, asked her to join a group of pious women who worked with poor children, and she did so.

In the anti-clerical atmosphere that prevailed in Portugal at the time, Luisa launched pastoral projects, taught catechism, and founded schools. At the age of 38, she felt called to religious life and tried it with the Carmelites. In 1915, she felt that she did not belong there and that she needed to found a new religious community, one that would adapt to the challenges of the time. So, in 1923, Luisa and her companions founded a small community in Santarém.

After her pilgrimage to Fátima, Luisa Andaluz established a house for missionary work near the shrine. In 1939, she named her sisters the Servants of Our Lady of Fátima, and that same year, the congregation received its canonical approval. Since then, the number of ecclesiastical houses in Portugal has increased, and Luisa served as Superior general of the congregation until 1953, when she retired to Fátima. In 1972, the first community was founded in Mozambique. Luisa died on 20 August 1973 at the age of 96.

== Beatification process ==
The cause for the beatification of Luisa de Andalus began in Lisbon in 1997. After the completion of the diocesan investigation, she was sent to Rome in July 2000 for examination by the Congregation for the Causes of Saints. On 19 December 2017, Pope Francis recognized Andaluz' heroic virtue, thus granting her the tile venerable.
