= José Policarpo =

Portuguese Catholic prelate (1936–2014)

His Eminence José IV GCC
- Cardinal, Patriarch emeritus of Lisbon
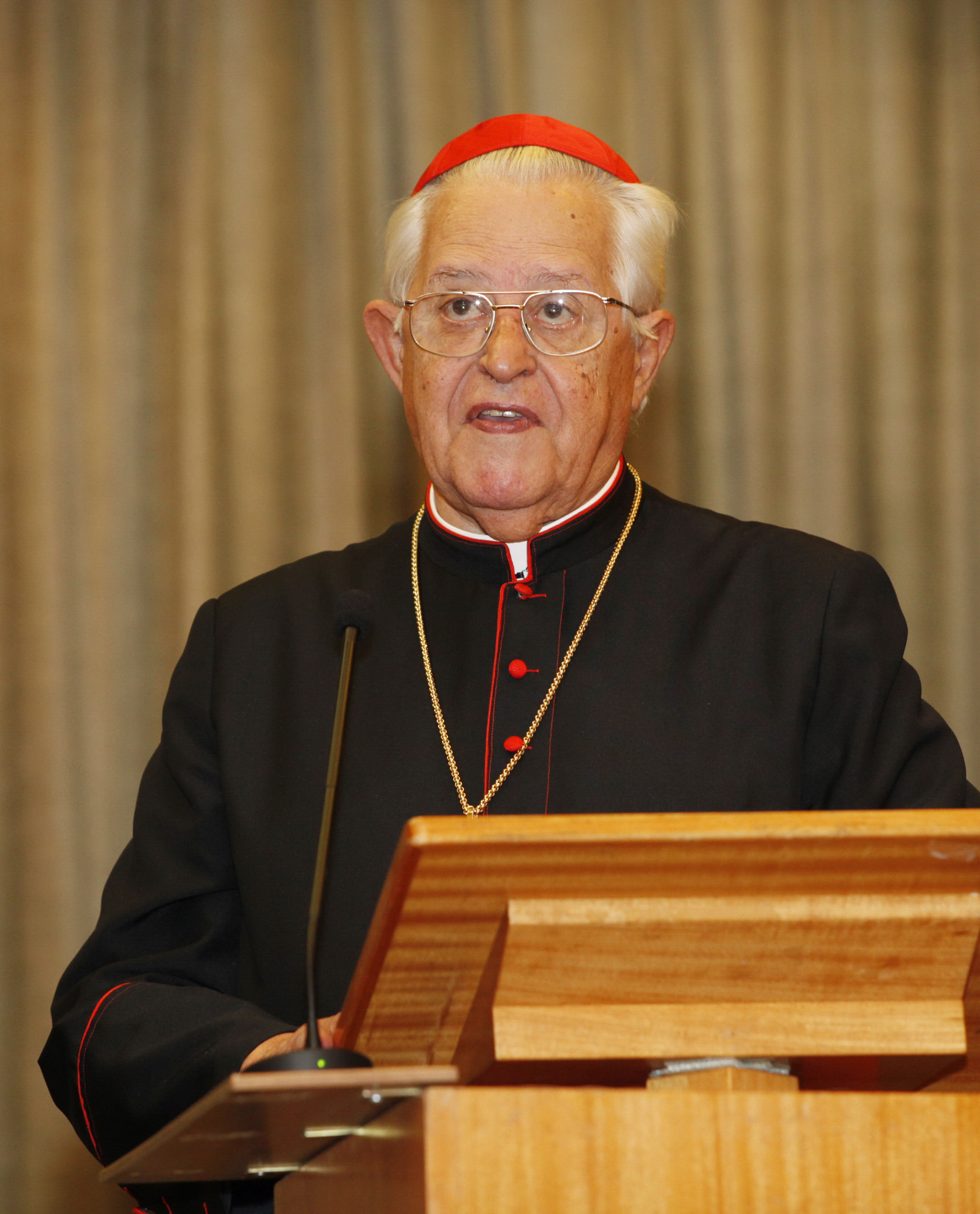
- Church: Catholic
- Archdiocese: Lisbon
- Appointed: 5 March 1997 (Coadjutor Patriarch)
- Installed: 24 March 1998
- Term ended: 18 May 2013
- Predecessor: António Ribeiro
- Successor: Manuel Clemente
- Other post: Cardinal-Priest of S. Antonio in Campo Marzio
- Previous posts: Auxiliary Bishop of Lisbon (1978–1997); Titular Bishop of Caliabria (1978–1997)

Orders
- Ordination: 15 August 1961 by Manuel Gonçalves Cerejeira
- Consecration: 29 June 1978 by António Ribeiro
- Created cardinal: 21 February 2001 by John Paul II
- Rank: Cardinal-Priest

Personal details
- Born: José da Cruz Policarpo; 26 February 1936 Alvorninha, Estremadura; Portugal
- Died: 12 March 2014 (aged 78) Lisbon, Portugal
- Motto: Per Obedientiam ad Libertatem (By Obedience to Freedom)
- Coat of arms: José IV's coat of arms

Styles of José da Cruz Policarpo
- Reference style: His Eminence
- Spoken style: Your Eminence
- Informal style: Cardinal
- See: Lisbon

José da Cruz Policarpo GCC (Portuguese: [ʒuˈzɛ ðɐ kɾuʃ poliˈkaɾpu]; 26 February 1936 – 12 March 2014), officially referred to as José IV, Patriarch of Lisbon, though usually referred to as "D. José Policarpo", was Patriarch of Lisbon from 24 March 1998 to 18 May 2013. Pope John Paul II made him a Cardinal in 2001. Policarpo held a doctorate in theology from the Pontifical Gregorian University in Rome.

== Early life ==
He was born on 26 February 1936 in Alvorninha, Caldas da Rainha, Portugal, the first of nine children of José Policarpo sr. (Caldas da Rainha, Alvorninha, Lugar do Pego, 18 April 1902 – Lisbon, Odivelas, 20 October 1987) and wife (m. Caldas da Rainha, Alvorninha, 26 January 1935) Maria Gertrudes Rosa (Alcobaça, Benedita, 17 October 1909 – Caldas da Rainha, Alvorninha, 6 September 1994), and ordained a priest on 15 August 1961 in Lisbon by Manuel Cardinal Cerejeira. José da Cruz' eight siblings were: Maria do Céu (b. 1939), Maria Adélia (b. 1942), Aníbal, Joaquim, António, Maria da Graça, Maria Edite (b. 1947) and Fernando (b. 1952).

== Early career ==
Policarpo was director of the seminary in Penafirme, rector of the seminary in Olivais and dean of the Theological Faculty of the Portuguese Catholic University. He later served two terms as rector of the same university (1988–96) and is the author of a number of books and scholarly articles.

== Appointed bishop ==
On 26 May 1978 Policarpo was appointed titular bishop of Caliabria and auxiliary bishop of Lisbon, receiving episcopal consecration on 29 June. On 5 March 1997 he was appointed Coadjuctor Archbishop of Lisbon and succeeded Cardinal António Ribeiro as Patriarch on 24 March 1998. Cardinal Policarpo was also President of the Portuguese Episcopal Conference and Grand Chancellor of the Portuguese Catholic University.

== Cardinal ==
He was created a cardinal by Pope John Paul II in the consistory of 21 February 2001, as Cardinal-Priest of Sant'Antonio in Campo Marzio. He was a member of the Congregation for Catholic Education, Pontifical Council for the Laity, and Pontifical Council for Culture in the Roman Curia.

Policarpo was one of about a dozen like-minded prelates, all European cardinals or bishops, who met annually from 1995 to 2006 in St. Gallen, Switzerland, to discuss reforms with respect to the appointment of bishops, collegiality, bishops' conferences, the primacy of the papacy and sexual morality; they differed among themselves, but shared the view that Cardinal Joseph Ratzinger was not the sort of candidate they hoped to see elected at the next conclave.

Upon the death of Pope John Paul II in 2005, Policarpo was considered to be papabile – a possible successor to the papacy. On 11 April 2005, the British newspaper The Guardian considered him to be "a dark-horse candidate for pope, capable of bridging the divide between the Europeans and the Latin American Roman Catholic cardinals". The 2005 papal conclave, in which he participated as a cardinal elector, ultimately elected Pope Benedict XVI. He was also a cardinal elector in the conclave of 2013 which elected Pope Francis. As a result of his position in the seniority among cardinals, when Cardinal Policarpo took the oath of secrecy in the Sistine Chapel at the start of the conclave, he took the oath immediately after Cardinal Jorge Bergoglio, the cardinal ultimately elected as Pope Francis.

His resignation was accepted on 18 May 2013 and Manuel Clemente, Bishop of Porto, was named to succeed him.

== Controversies ==
=== Pro-abortion-rights politicians ===
His refusal to deny communion or excommunicate those who called themselves Catholics and who openly supported legalization of abortion was also criticised by many anti-abortion Catholics for being one of the main reasons for the legalisation of abortion in Portugal, in 2007. However, he did not openly deny the right of the Portuguese Roman Catholic priests to refuse them communion, which many in fact did.

=== Marriages with Muslim men ===
On 14 January 2009, the cardinal directed a warning to young women to "think twice" before marrying Muslim men: Christians should learn more about Islam and respect Muslims, but marrying a Muslim man is getting into a lot of trouble, that not even Allah knows where it would end, if the couple moved to an Islamic country. He also said that dialogue "with our Muslim brothers" is difficult, because it is possible to dialogue only with those who want to have dialogue. Human rights group Amnesty International criticized Policarpo for inciting "discrimination" and "intolerance", and a representative of the Muslim community in Portugal said they were hurt and surprised by his words, but remarked that his words could be interpreted as a call to respect differences and get to know the other religion. A spokesman for the Portuguese Episcopal Conference said the cardinal had offered "realistic advice" rather than "discrimination" or "contempt for another culture or religion".

=== Ordination of women ===
Cardinal da Cruz Policarpo in June 2011 stated in a magazine interview that, while there is no fundamental theological obstacle to ordination of women, there is, in fact, an obstacle regarding the strong tradition dating from Jesus. There will certainly be no change in our lifetime, he said, and so the question ought not to be raised – it provokes many reactions. Nearly two weeks after giving the interview, he issued a clarification of his comments, in which he unequivocally reaffirmed the teaching of Pope John Paul II in Ordinatio sacerdotalis.

== Honours ==
- Grand-Cross of the Order of Christ, Portugal (11 May 2010)

== See also ==
- College of Cardinals
- List of Cardinals from Portugal

Catholic Church titles
Preceded by António Ribeiro	Patriarch of Lisbon; 1998–2013	Succeeded by Manuel Clemente
New title	Cardinal-Priest of Sant'Antonio in Campo Marzio; 2001–2014	Succeeded by Manuel Clemente
