= Manuel I =

Manuel I may refer to:

- Manuel I Komnenos, Byzantine emperor (1143–1180)
- Manuel I of Trebizond, Emperor of Trebizond (1228–1263)
- Manuel I of Portugal, King of Portugal (1496–1521)
- Manuel I, Patriarch of Lisbon (1800–1869)
