= List of presidents of the Chamber of Deputies (Kingdom of Portugal) =

The president of the Chamber of Deputies was the presiding officer of the lower house of the Cortes Gerais, the legislature of the Kingdom of Portugal during most of the constitutional monarchy period.

Portrait	Name (born-died)	Tenure
Presidents of Cortes Gerais de Extraordinarias da Nação de Portugesa
	Vicente da Soledade e Castro (1763-1823)	26 January 1821 – 26 February 1821
	Manuel Fernandes Tomás (1771–1822)	27 February 1821 – 26 March 1821
	Hermano José Braamcamp de Almeida Castelo Branco (1775-1846)	27 March 1821 – 26 May 1821
	José Joaquim Ferreira de Moura (1776-1829)	28 May 1821 – 26 July 1821
	José António Faria de Carvalho (?-1840)	27 July 1821 – 25 August 1821
	Manuel José Vaz Velho (1775-1830)	27 August 1821 – 26 September 1821
	José Maria Soares de Castelo Branco (1767-1831)	27 September 1821 – 26 October 1821
	Francisco Manuel Trigoso de Aragão Morato (1777-1838)	27 October 1821 – 25 January 1822
	Manuel de Serpa Saraiva Machado (1784-1858)	28 January 1822 – 25 February 1822
	Luís Nicolau Fagundes Varela (1766-1831)	27 February 1822 – 26 March 1822
	António Camelo Fortes de Pina, 1.º Visconde das Torres (1770-1841)	27 March 1822 – 25 May 1822
	Carlos Honório de Gouveia Durão (1766-1846)	28 May 1822 – 26 July 1822
	Agostinho José Freire (1780-1836)	27 July 1822 – 26 September 1822
	Francisco Manuel Trigoso de Aragão Morato (1777-1838)	27 September 1822 – 4 November 1822
Presidents of Cortes Ordinárias e Extraordinárias
	José Joaquim Ferreira de Moura (1776-1829)	20 November 1822 – 31 December 1822
	Francisco Simões Margiochi (1774 – 1838)	2 January 1823 – 31 January 1823
	Agostinho José Freire (1780-1836)	1 February 1823 – 28 February 1823
	Francisco de São Luís Saraiva (1766-1845)	1 March 1823 – 14 May 1823
	João de Sousa Pinto de Magalhães (1790-1865)	15 May 1823 – 3 June 1823
Presidents of the Chamber of Deputies
	Francisco de São Luís Saraiva (1766-1845)	6 November 1826 – 14 March 1828
	Francisco de São Luís Saraiva (1766-1845)	21 August 1834 – 14 September 1834
	António Marciano Azevedo Hipólito (?-?)	13 October 1834 – 1 January 1836
	Manuel António de Carvalho, 1.º Barão de Chanceleiros (1785-1858)	9 January 1836 – 4 June 1836
Presidents of Cortes Gerais, Extraordinárias e Constituintes da Nação Portgesa
	Anselmo José Braamcamp de Almeida Castelo Branco senior (1792-1841)	23 January 1837 – 21 March 1837
	António Dias de Oliveira (?-1883)	22 March 1837 – 1 June 1837
	José Alexandre de Campos e Almeida (1794-1850)	22 June 1837 – 10 August 1837
	Macário de Castro da Fonseca e Sousa Osório (?-1852)	12 August 1837 – 21 December 1837
	José Caetano de Campos Henriques (1800-?)	21 December 1837 – 4 April 1838
Presidents of the Chamber of Deputies
	José Caetano de Campos Henriques (1800-?)	8 January 1839 – 1 January 1840
	Guilherme Henriques de Carvalho (1793-1857)	3 January 1840 – 25 February 1840
	João de Sousa Pinto de Magalhães (1790-1865)	5 June 1840 – 16 July 1841
	António Aloísio Jervis de Atouguia (1797-1861)	20 July 1841 – 1 January 1842
	Bernardo Gorjão Henriques da Cunha Coimbra Botado e Serra (1786-1854)	1 August 1842 – 1 January 1847
	João Rebelo da Costa Cabral (1805-1881)	26 January 1848 – 25 May 1851
	Júlio Gomes da Silva Sanches Machado da Rocha (1802-1866)	17 January 1852 – 24 July 1852
	Júlio Gomes da Silva Sanches Machado da Rocha (1802-1866)	31 January 1853 – 6 June 1856
	Joaquim Filipe de Soure (1805-1882)	24 January 1857 − 26 March 1858
	Manuel António Velez Caldeira de Pina Castelo Branco (1791-1868)	21 June 1858 − 3 November 1859
	Custódio Rebelo de Carvalho (1805-1883)	8 November 1859 − 23 November 1859
	Bartolomeu dos Mártires Dias e Sousa (1806-1882)	11 February 1860 − 6 January 1861
	Custódio Rebelo de Carvalho (1805-1883)	9 January 1861 − 27 March 1861
	Custódio Rebelo de Carvalho (1805-1883)	10 June 1861 − 3 November 1861
	António Luís de Seabra e Sousa, 1º Visconde de Seabra (1798-1895)	24 December 1861 − 3 November 1863
	Custódio Rebelo de Carvalho (1805-1883)	3 January 1863 − 1 January 1864
	Cesário Augusto de Azevedo Pereira (1806-1878)	5 January 1864 − 15 May 1865
	Roque Joaquim Fernandes Tomás (1807-1871)	26 August 1865 − 1 January 1866
	Cesário Augusto de Azevedo Pereira (1806-1878)	5 January 1866 − 14 January 1868
	José Maria da Costa e Silva (?-?)	27 April 1868 − 1 January 1869
	José da Silva Mendes Leal junior (1820-1886)	8 January 1869 − 23 January 1869
	Diogo António Palmeiro Pinto (1807-1892)	1 May 1869 − 20 January 1870
	Diogo António Palmeiro Pinto (1807-1892)	8 April 1870 − 21 July 1870
	António Cabral de Sá Nogueira (1799-1879)	25 October 1870 − 21 July 1871
	António Frutuoso Aires de Gouveia Osório (1828-1916)	27 July 1871 − 22 September 1871
	José Marcelino de Sá Vargas (1802-1876)	4 January 1872 − 1 January 1875
	Joaquim Gonçalves Mamede (1818-1880)	9 January 1875 − 1 January 1879
	Francisco Joaquim da Costa e Silva (1826-1899)	23 January 1879 − 28 August 1879
	José Joaquim Fernandes Vaz (1837-1918)	15 January 1880 − 11 February 1881
	Luís Frederico de Bivar Gomes da Costa (1827-1904)	20 January 1882 − 24 May 1884
	Luís Frederico de Bivar Gomes da Costa (1827-1904)	27 December 1884 − 1 January 1886
	Inácio Francisco Silveira da Mota (1836-1907)	5 January 1886 − 1 January 1887
	José Maria Rodrigues de Carvalho (1830-1908)	13 April 1887 − 1 January 1889
	Francisco de Barros Coelho e Campos (?-?)	11 January 1889 − 1 January 1890
	Manuel Afonso de Espregueira (1835-1917)	15 January 1890 − 20 January 1890
	Pedro Augusto de Carvalho (1841-1894)	5 May 1890 − 1 January 1891
	António de Azevedo Castelo Branco (1842-1916)	6 March 1891 − 7 December 1893
	António Ribeiro dos Santos Viegas (1843-1908)	17 October 1894 − 28 March 1895
	António José da Costa Santos (1834?-1898)	8 January 1896 − 8 February 1897
	Eduardo José Coelho (1835-1913)	30 June 1897 − 28 March 1898
	Manuel Afonso de Espregueira (1835-1917)	8 April 1898 – 2 January 1899
	Luís Fisher Berquó Poças Falcão (1852-1913)	13 January 1899 – 25 October 1900
	Mateus Teixeira de Azevedo (1842-1931)	7 January 1901 – 4 June 1901
	Mateus Teixeira de Azevedo (1842-1931)	8 January 1902 – 20 April 1904
	Mateus Teixeira de Azevedo (1842-1931)	4 October 1904 – 24 December 1904
	Vicente Rodrigues Monteiro (1847-1936)	10 April 1905 – 9 February 1906
	Tomás António Pizarro de Melo de Sampaio (1862-1914)	2 October 1906 – 27 February 1908
	Libânio António Fialho Gomes (?-?)	1 May 1908 – 28 February 1909
	José Joaquim Mendes Leal (1859-1930)	4 March 1909 – 1 March 1910
	José Capelo Franco Frazão, 1.º conde de Penha Garcia (1872-1940)	5 March 1910 – 27 June 1910

== Sources ==
- "Presidentes do Parlamento – Monarquia" (PDF). Assembleia da República.
