= Américo Ferreira dos Santos Silva =

His Eminence Américo Ferreira dos Santos Silva
- Bishop of Porto
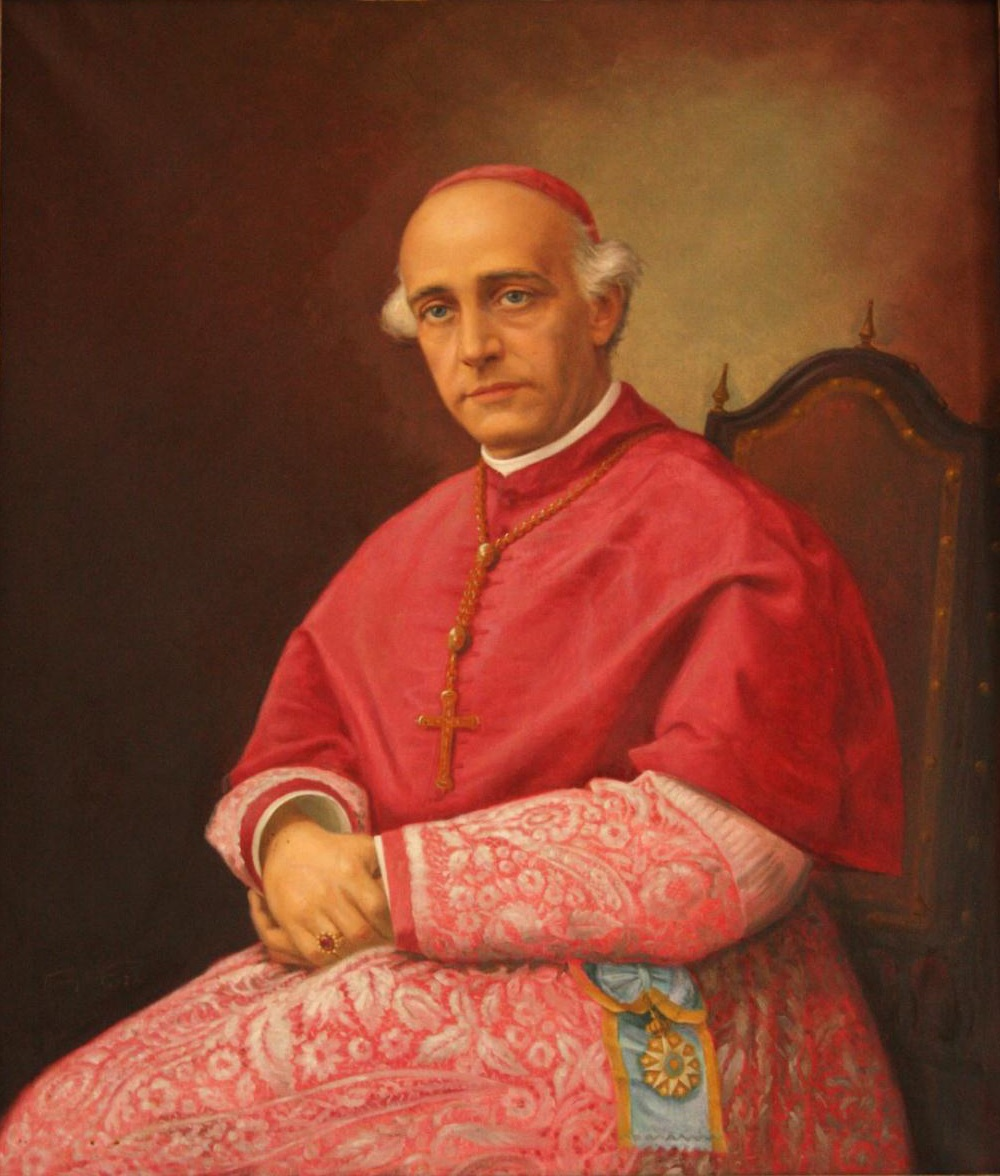
- Church: Roman Catholic Church
- Diocese: Porto
- See: Porto
- Appointed: 26 June 1871
- Installed: 20 September 1871
- Term ended: 21 January 1899
- Predecessor: João de França Castro e Moura
- Successor: António José de Souza Barroso
- Other post: Cardinal-Priest of Santi Quattro Coronati (1880-99)

Orders
- Ordination: 26 September 1852
- Consecration: 10 September 1871 by Inácio do Nascimento Morais Cardoso
- Created cardinal: 12 May 1879 by Pope Leo XIII
- Rank: Cardinal-Priest

Personal details
- Born: Américo Ferreira dos Santos Silva; 16 January 1830 Porto, Kingdom of Portugal
- Died: 21 January 1899 (aged 69) Porto, Kingdom of Portugal
- Buried: Porto Cathedral
- Parents: João Ferreira dos Santos Silva; Carolina Augusta de La Rocque
- Education: University of Coimbra
- Coat of arms

Américo Ferreira dos Santos Silva (Note: Some sources use Silva (occasionally Silvas) as the family name, but the records of the Holy See refer to "Emo [Eminentissimo] Ferreira dos Santos Silva". The Diocese of Porto death registry, witnessed by his coadjutor, records his name as "Americo Cardeal Ferreira dos Santos Silva".) (16 January 1830 – 21 January 1899) was a Portuguese prelate of the Catholic Church, who was Bishop of Porto from 1871 until his death. He was made a cardinal in 1879.

== Biography ==
Américo Ferreira dos Santos Silva was born in Porto on 16 January 1830. (Note: His birth year is often given as 1829, but his baptismal record says he was "Nasceu no dia dezaceis de Janeiro do anno de mil oito centos e trinta" ("He was born on the sixteenth of January of the year of a thousand eight hundred and thirty") and 1830 is consistent with his death record which states his age as 69, not 70, on 21 January 1899.) His father Joao Ferreira dos Santos Silva, baron of Santos, was a businessman and banker; his mother Carolina Augusta de La Rocque was of French descend. The family lived in Paris for a time and from 1840 to 1843 he studied at a Portuguese-language school, Colegio Luso-Brasileiro in Fontenay-aux-Roses outside of Paris.

He studied at the Theological Faculty of Coimbra and earned a doctorate in theology in 1852. He was ordained a priest of the Diocese of Porto on 26 September 1852. From 1853 to 1862, he taught dogmatic and pastoral theology at the seminary in Santarém, where he became vice-rector in 1855. In the 1860s he moved to Lisbon and held several positions before bring named archpriest on 13 August 1869 and serving as vicar from 1869 to 1871.

King Luís I of Portugal nominated him for bishop of Porto on 31 May 1871 and Pope Pius IX appointed him bishop of Porto on 26 June 1871. He received his episcopal consecration on 10 September 1871 from Inácio do Nascimento de Morais Cardoso, patriarch of Lisbon. He distinguished himself in promoting the education of the clergy and their proper behavior.

Pope Leo XIII made him a cardinal priest on 12 May 1879. He received his red galero and the title of Santi Quattro Coronati on 27 February 1880.

A guide to the College of Cardinals published in 1889 said he was a rare example of virtue and austerity among the Portuguese hierarchy, well-known in Portugal but "perfectly unknown" in Rome, sufficiently unknown to be misidentified as an archbishop.

He died in Porto on 21 January 1899.
