= San Domenico di Guzman =

San Domenico di Guzman may refer to:

- the Italian for Saint Dominic of Guzman
- Italian churches dedicated to him, notably
  - San Domenico di Guzman (Rome), a cardinal-deaconry and Roman parish church
  - Basilica of San Domenico, in Bologna
- San Domenico di Guzman (oratorio) an oratorio by Antonio Braga based on the saint's life
