= Santi Marcellino e Pietro al Laterano =

- Church of Saints Marcellinus and Peter at the Lateran
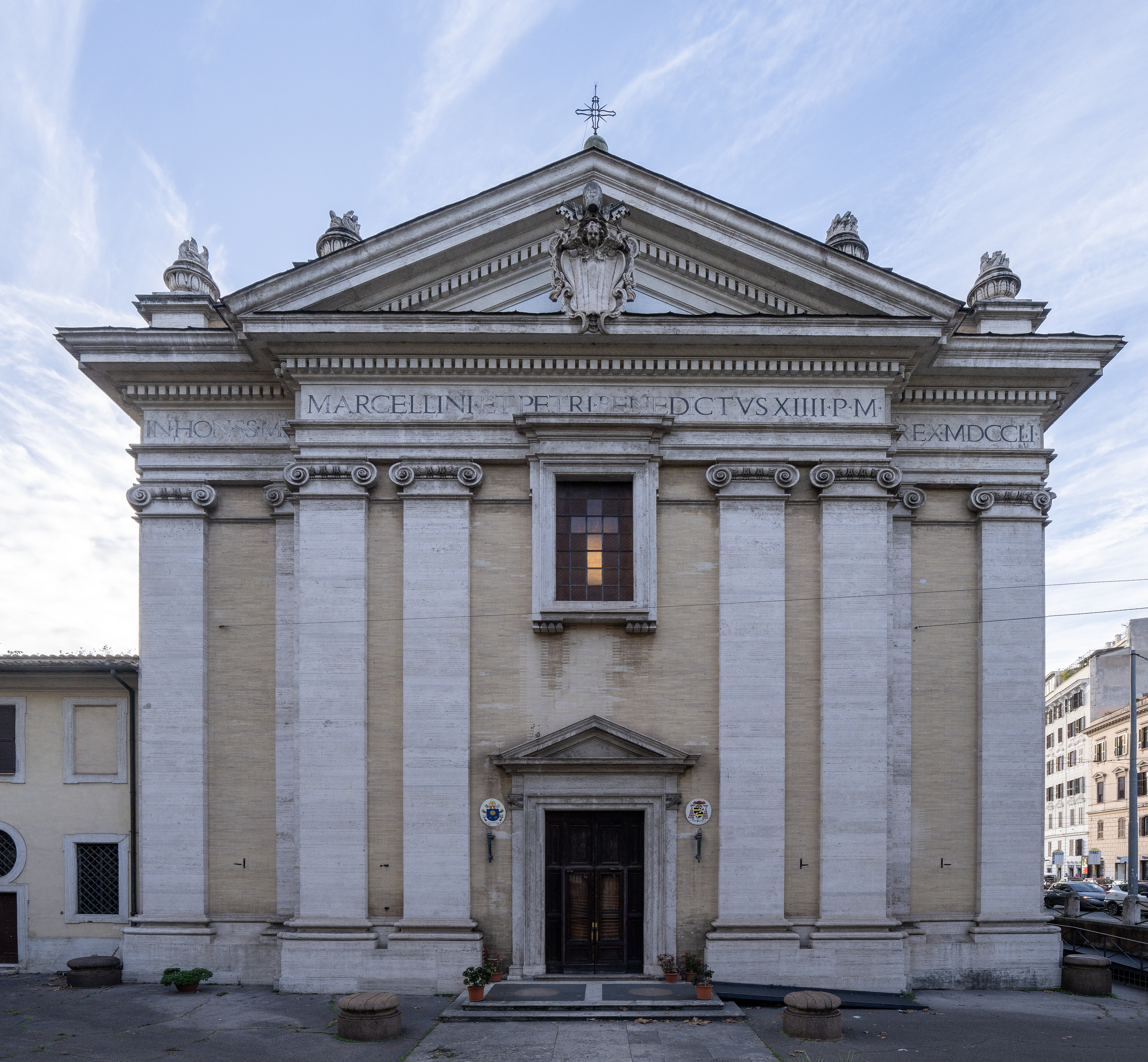
- Church façade
- Click on the map for a fullscreen view
- 41°53′20.57″N 12°30′11.26″E
- Location: Via Labicana 1, Rome
- Country: Italy
- Denomination: Catholic

History
- Status: Titular church
- Founded: 4th century
- Dedication: Marcellinus and Peter

Architecture
- Architect: Gerolamo Theodoli
- Style: Paleochristian, Baroque
- Completed: 1751

Administration
- Diocese: Rome

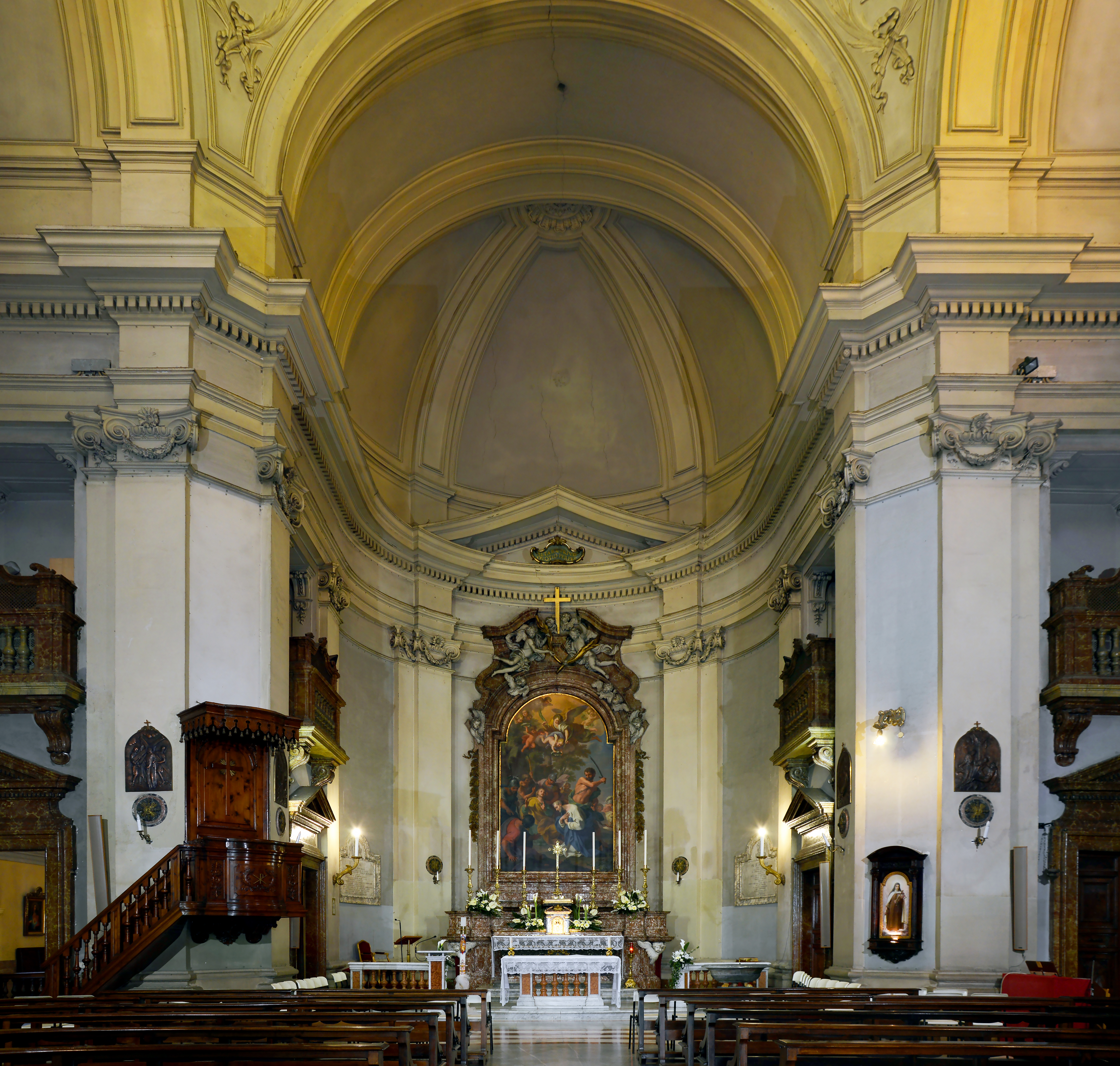
Church interior.

Santi Marcellino e Pietro al Laterano is a Roman Catholic parish and titular church in Rome on the Via Merulana. One of the oldest churches in Rome, it is dedicated to Saints Marcellinus and Peter, 4th century Roman martyrs, whose relics were brought here in 1256.

== History ==
The first church on the site was built in the fourth century, not far from the Via Labicana's catacombs of Marcellinus and Peter, with an adjoining hospice which became a centre for pilgrims. The church was restored by Pope Gregory III in the 8th century. Ever since these early centuries, it has been among Rome's stational churches for the Saturday of the Second Week in Lent. When the church was rebuilt in 1256 by Pope Alexander IV, the martyrs' relics were transferred from a church located on the ancient "via Labicana", built on the catacombs where the two saints were buried. An image of the dedicatees was placed on the first column on the left from the entrance during this restoration, with an inscription recording the restoration. The hospice was transferred in 1276 to the Ospedale del Salvatore.

In 1751 the property became a canonry with four canons of the Lateran, which then leased the premises to Discalced Carmelite nuns in 1767, where they remained until 1906. The nuns had a cloister garden, separated from the Via Labicana by a wall. Since then, it has been a parochial church served by diocesan clergy.

Seized by the state in 1873 the church is managed today through the Fondo Edifici di Culto (FEC). The former convent, from the 18th century, is now used as a barracks.

== Architecture ==
The present church, which now lies below street level, is the result of Pope Benedict XIV's 1751 reconstruction a bit northeast of the old church. The cube-shaped exterior is divided by pilaster strips in a Neoclassical style, but with a late-Baroque elements, including a dome influenced by the architecture of Borromini. The façade was designed by Girolamo Theodoli. An inscription that runs along the facade recalls the reconstruction carried out in 1751 by Pope Benedict XIV. The doorway has a simple triangular pediment.

=== Interior ===
The church has a Greek cross plan: the main altarpiece by Gaetano Lapis depicts the dedicatees' martyrdom. Under the high altar is an urn containing relics of Saint Marzia.

On the left side is a chapel dedicated to the Blessed Virgin, with a copy of Guido Reni's The Virgin in Glory with Angels, St Joseph and St Rita. The chapel on the right is dedicated to Saint Gregory with an altarpiece by Filippo Evangelisti.

== List of Cardinal Priests ==
The last cardinal holding the title of the church was Czech cardinal Dominik Jaroslav Duka, O. P.
The following Cardinals were Cardinal Priests of Santi Marcellino e Pietro al Laterano:

- Glusiano de Casate (1281-1287)
- Jean Lemoine (1294–1313)
- Luca Fieschi (1313–1316)
- Gauscelin de Jean (1316–1327)
- Pierre de Mortemart (1328-1335)
- Pasteur de Sarrats (1350-1356)
- Guillaume Farinier (1356-1361)
- Philippe de Cabassoles (1368-1370)
- Andrea Bontempi Martini (1378-1390)
  - Pedro Raimundo de Barrière CanReg (1379–1383), (pseudocardinal)
- Angelo Barbarigo (1408–1418)
- Isidore of Kiev (1439–1451)
- Louis d'Albret (1461–1465)
- Oliviero Carafa (1467–1470)
- Philippe de Lévis (1473–1475)
- Jorge da Costa (1476–1484)
- vacant (1484–1493)
- Bernardino López de Carvajal (1493–1495)
- Philippe de Luxembourg (1495–1509)
- Louis d'Amboise (1510–1511)
- Christopher Bainbridge (1511)
- vacant (1511–1515)
- Adrien Gouffier de Boissy (1515–1517); in commendation (1517–1520)
- vacant (1520–1530)
- François de Tournon CRSA (1530–1550)
- Georges II d’Amboise (1550)
- Pietro Bertani OP (1551–1558)
- Giovanni Francesco Gambara (1561–1565) (Cardinaldiacon)
- Flavio Orsini (1565–1578); in commendation (1578–1581)
- vacant (1581–1588)
- Stefano Bonucci OSM (1588–1589)
- Mariano Pierbenedetti (1590–1607)
- Orazio Maffei (1607–1609)
- vacant (1609–1614)
- Giovanni Battista Deti (1614–1623)
- vacant (1623–1664)
- Girolamo Boncompagni (1664–1684)
- vacant (1684–1690)
- Giacomo Cantelmo (1690–1702)
- Francesco Pignatelli CR (1704–1719)
- Giovanni Francesco Barbarigo (1721–1730)
- Sigismund von Kollonitz (1730–1740)
- vacant (1740–1753)
- Vincenzo Malvezzi (1753–1775)
- Bernardino Honorati (1777–1807)
- vacant(1807–1816)
- Nicola Riganti (1816–1822)
- vacant (1822–1827)
- Giacomo Giustiniani (1827–1839)
- Giovanni Maria Mastai Ferretti (1840–1846)
- Gaetano Baluffi (1847–1866)
- Giuseppe Berardi (1868–1878)
- Florian Desprez (1879–1895)
- Domenico Maria Jacobini (1896–1900)
- Alessandro Sanminiatelli Zabarella (1901–1910)
- vacant (1910–1914)
- António Mendes Bello (1914–1929)
- Manuel Gonçalves Cerejeira (1929–1977)
- Jean-Marie Lustiger (1983–1994)
- Aloysius Matthew Ambrozic (1998–2011)
- Dominik Duka OP (2012–2025)

== Bibliography ==
- Giacomo Laderchi, De sacris basilicis ss. martyrum Marcellini et Petri de urbe dissertation historica (Roma: per F. Gonzagam, 1705).
- Giovanni Battista de Rossi, Escavazioni nel cimitero dei ss. Pietro e Marcellino sulla via Labicana (Roma: Tipi del Salviucci 1882) .
