= Glusiano de Casate =

Italian ecclesiastical lawyer and cardinal

Comes Glusiano de Casate (Latin: Comes Glusianus de Casate; Italian: Cosmo or Cosimo Giussiano; born in Milan, date unknown – died in Rome, 8 April 1287) was an Italian ecclesiastical lawyer and Roman Catholic cardinal. He came from an important family, as his funeral monument describes him as de magno sanguine natus (born of noble blood). He was learned in the law, "tu sapiens pectus iuris vexilla ferebas."

Casate served as Archdeacon of the Church of Milan.

== The Roman Curia ==
Casate was later brought to Rome, where he became a papal Chaplain and, under Pope Nicholas III, served in the papal Chancery as Auditor sacri palatii (later termed Auditor of the Rota). The Vice-Chancellor, the effective head of the papal Secretariat, and Comes' superior from 1276 to 1288 was Pietro Peregrosso of Milan, and it is not an unreasonable conjecture that he was the original patron of Comes de Casate.

He was one of the officials, along with Pietro Peregrosso, who were charged by Nicholas III in 1279 with producing the finished version of Exiit qui seminat, the papal bull which granted a favorable constitution to the Franciscan Order.

== Cardinalate ==
Comes de Casate was named a cardinal-priest by Pope Martin IV in the Consistory of 12 April 1281 and assigned the titular church of SS. Pietro e Marcellino in Rome. He was appointed an ecclesiastical examiner of canonical validity and personal worthiness by Pope Martin in the final stages of the long-running case of the election of an Abbot of the monastery of S. Benedetto de Padolirone in the diocese of Mantua. Although the bull had been signed on 14 January 1285 it had not yet received the bulla (lead seal) when Pope Martin died on 28 March 1285, and had to wait for Pope Honorius IV to order his seal to be affixed. He was also appointed the Auditor (judge) in the case of the double election of a bishop of Nevers. The two candidates were persuaded to spontaneously and freely resign their elections into the hands of the Pope. The matter of the vacancy in the bishopric came to Honorius IV after the death of Martin IV, and he appointed his chaplain, Egidius de Castelleto. Cardinal Comes de Casate was also appointed Auditor by Pope Martin IV in a lawsuit over the income of a prebend in the Cathedral of Paris between one of the Canons and the Monastery of S. Victor; he finally issued a judgment on 31 August 1285, and Pope Honorius IV finally confirmed it on 22 October. It took another mandate from the Pope, however, to get the verdict obeyed. Cardinal Comes was also appointed, on 31 July 1285, to serve as Auditor in the dispute between the Bishop of Poitiers and the monastery of Aureevallis. He had also been appointed that Summer to examine the election of a new Abbot of Monte Cassino, Thomas the Dean of the monastery, which was approved on his recommendation by Pope Honorius on 28 September 1285.

Cardinal Comes was one of fourteen cardinals who were present in Consistory on 17 September 1285, when the "Constitution for the Organization of the Kingdom of Sicily" was promulgated. This document was made necessary by the disastrous events which had ruined the control of the Roman Church over the island of Sicily and loosened its grip on southern Italy. King Charles I of Anjou had suffered disastrous losses in the rising called the Sicilian Vespers in the Spring of 1282; he had died on 7 January 1285, with Sicily in the hands of Peter III of Aragon. The entire island of Sicily had been excommunicated and laid under interdict by Pope Martin IV, ever the compliant friend and abettor of King Charles. But there is a certain unreality about the whole occasion of the issue of the Constitution. The Pope had no means at all to enforce his decrees, which had the form of an overlord dictating to a villain, and overlord who had not fulfilled his feudal duties to his vassals. Martin IV had been a major part of the Sicilian problem, and Honorius IV's response provided rhetoric, but no solution to the Church's problems.

== Reign of Pope Honorius IV (1285-1287) ==
At the end of 1285 Cardinal Comes was again appointed Examiner of Bishops in the case of the Bishop of Utica (Uzès) in Aquitaine, which was approved by Pope Honorius on 4 January 1286. He also participated in the case of the Bishop-elect of Fossombrone, which was approved on 28 February 1286; that of Chieti, approved on 31 March; that of Ascoli Piceno on 13 December 1285; that of Lamego in Spain, approved on 25 May 1286; that of Chioggia, which was still being litigated on 17 June 1286 and not concluded until 11 January 1287; and that of Archbishop-elect Andrea of Florence. He was Auditor in the famous case of the many English benefices of Tedisio de Camilla, relative of Pope Adrian V, which Archbishop John Peckham was trying to curtail. He was also appointed Auditor in the case of the election of the abbot of S. Maria in Pinerolo, and the election of an abbess at S. Croix in Poitiers.

== The Conclave of 1287 ==
Pope Honorius IV (Giacomo Savelli) died in his palace next to the Church and Monastery of Santa Sabina on the Aventine Hill on Holy Thursday, 3 April 1287. There were sixteen cardinals at the time of the Pope's death. It was a year of pestilence, however, and many of the cardinals were ill. Six of them died. One of the first to depart, and he may not even have been present at the opening of the Conclave, was Cardinal Comes Glusiano de Casate. He died and was buried on 8 April 1287, as his funeral inscription bears witness. He was buried in the Lateran Basilica, though his tomb and many others suffered during the two large fires in the basilica in 1307 and 1361, as well as the major alterations carried out under Borromini in the 17th century, and under instructions of Leo XIII in the 19th.
