= Diocese of Faro =

Roman Catholic diocese in Portugal

Coordinates: 37.0133°N 7.9348°W

Diocese of Faro Dioecesis Pharaonensis Diocese do Algarve

Catholic
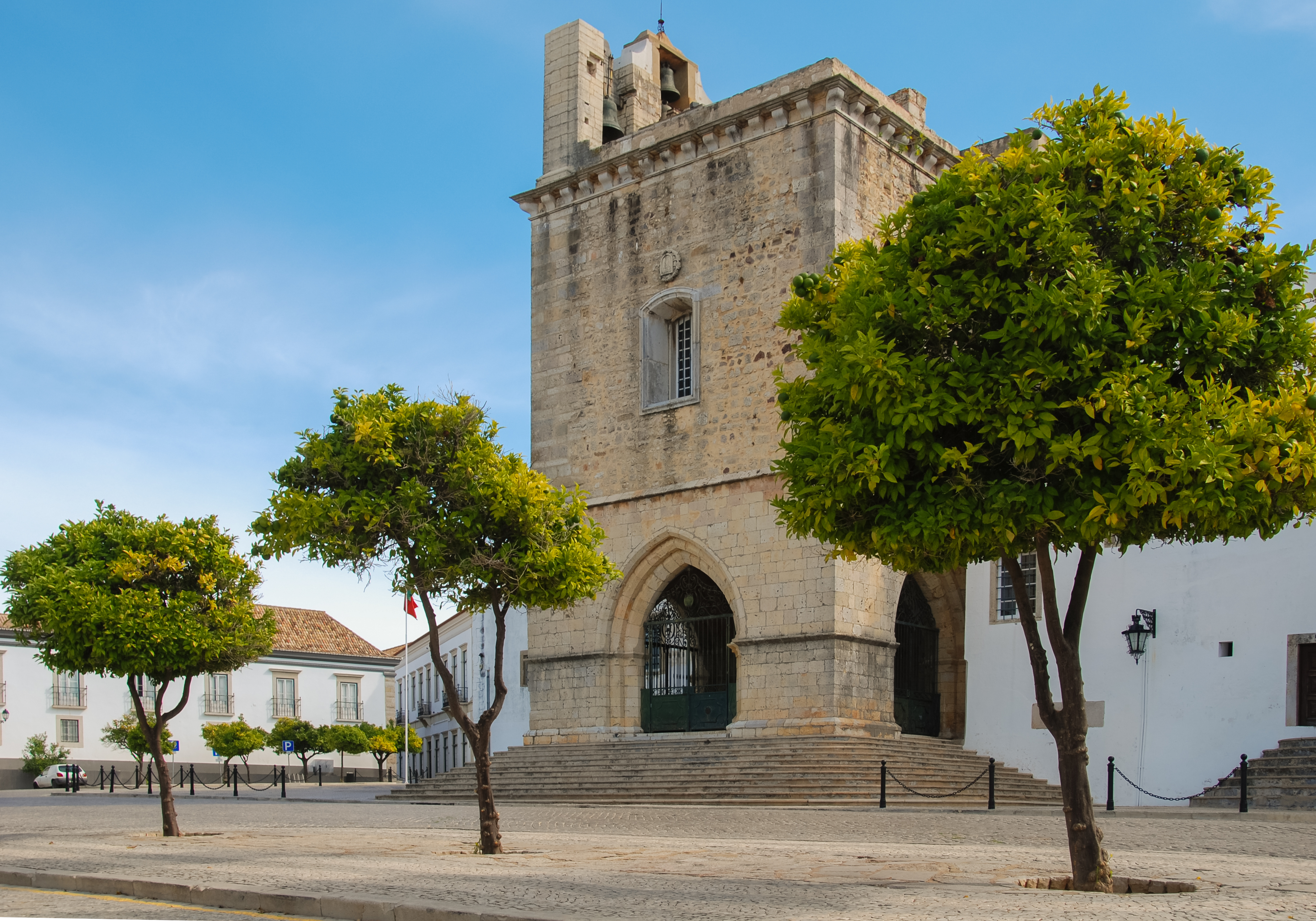
- Cathedral of Saint Mary in Faro, Algarve

Location
- Country: Portugal
- Ecclesiastical province: Évora
- Metropolitan: Archdiocese of Evora
- Headquarters: Faro, Algarve, Portugal

Statistics
- Area: 5,071 km^{2} (1,958 sq mi)
- Population: Total; Catholics: (as of 2023); 438,480; 263,430 (60.1%)
- Parishes: 80

Information
- Denomination: Catholic Church
- Sui iuris church: Latin Church
- Rite: Roman Rite
- Established: 306 (As Diocese of Ossonoba); 1189 (As Diocese of Silves); 30 March 1577 (As Diocese of Faro)
- Cathedral: Cathedral of Saint Mary in Faro
- Patron saint: Vincent of Saragossa
- Secular priests: 59 (44 Diocesan, 15 Religious Orders)

Current leadership
- Pope: Leo XIV
- Bishop: Vitorino José Pereira Soares
- Metropolitan Archbishop: Francisco Senra Coelho
- Bishops emeritus: Manuel Madureira Dias; Manuel Neto Quintas, S.C.I.

Map
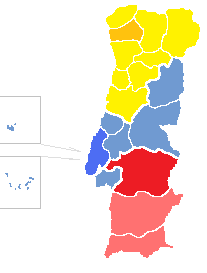

Website
- Website of the Diocese

The Diocese of Faro (Latin: Dioecesis Pharaonensis), also called the Diocese of the Algarve and formerly the Diocese of Ossonoba and Diocese of Silves, is a Latin Church diocese of the Catholic church in Portugal. It is a suffragan of the archdiocese of Évora. The current bishop of Faro is Vitorino José Pereira Soares.

== History ==
A see in the Algarve region was founded at Ossonoba in 306. After the Islamic conquest, this place fell, and in 688, the see was suppressed. It was re-established in 1188 at Silves, and in 1218 was made suffragan to the archdiocese of Braga, then to the archdiocese of Seville, in 1393 to the archdiocese of Lisbon and finally, in 1540, to the archdiocese of Évora. The title was transferred to Faro, 30 March 1577.

== List of bishops ==
=== Bishops of Ossonoba ===
- Vincent (mentioned in 306)
- Itacius (before 379 – after 387)
- Peter (mentioned in 589)
- Saturninus (mentioned in 653)
- Exarnus (mentioned in 666)
- Belitus (mentioned in 683)
- Agrippius (before 688 – after 693)

=== Bishops of Silves ===
- Nicolau (1188 – 1191), first bishop after the reconquest of Silves
  - Sede vacante (1191–1253)
- Roberto (before 28 August 1253 – 1260)
- Garcia (before 8 April 1261 – after May 1267)
- Bartolomeu (4 July 1268 – after 1288)
- Domingos Soares (27 May 1292 – 1297)
- João Soares Alão (12 November 1299 – 12 July 1313, transferred to León)
- Afonso Anes (9 October 1313 – 1320/1321)
- Pedro I (31 July 1321 – 9 June 1333, transferred to Astorga)
- Alvarus Pelagius (9 June 1333 – ?)
- Vasco (18 February 1350 – ?)
- João II (5 November 1365 – 9 February 1373, transferred to Porto)
- Martinho de Zamora (9 February 1373 – 7 February 1379, transferred to Lisbon)
- Pedro II (7 February 1379 – ?)
- Paio de Meira (1383 – after 5 December 1386)
- João Afonso Esteves (11 May 1389 – 15 February 1391, transferred to Porto)
- Martinho Gil (15 February 1391 – 6 February 1404, transferred to Évora)
- João Afonso Aranha (6 February 1404 – 3 February 1407, transferred to Porto)
- Martinho Gil (1407 – 1409) (second time)
- Fernando da Guerra (2 July 1409 – 18 June 1414, transferred to Porto)
- João Álvaro (18 June 1414 – 1418)
- Garcia de Menezes (15 July 1418 – 25 June 1421, transferred to Lamego)
- Álvaro de Abreu (25 June 1421 – 11 February 1429, transferred to Évora)
- Rodrigo Lourenço (12 March 1429 – 1440)
- Rodrigo Dias o Diogo (22 May 1441 – ?)
- Luís Pires (26 January 1450 – 24 August 1453, transferred to Porto)
- Álvaro Afonso (24 August 1453 – 8 February 1468, transferred to Évora)
- João de Melo (8 February 1468 – 5 September 1481, transferred to Braga)
- Jorge da Costa (5 September 1481 – 1486, transferred to Braga)
- João Camelo Madureira (27 January 1486 – 24 January 1502, transferred to Lamego)
- Fernando Coutinho (24 January 1502 – 1536)
- Manuel de Sousa (23 September 1538 – 22 March 1545, transferred to Braga)
  - Sede vacante (1545–1549)
- João de Melo (13 March 1549 – 21 June 1564, transferred to Évora)

=== Bishops of Faro ===
- Jerónimo Osório (21 June 1564 – 20 August 1580)
- Afonso de Castelo-Branco (5 June 1581 – 3 June 1585, transferred to Coimbra)
- Jerónimo Barreto (3 June 1585 – 1589)
- Francisco Cano (30 August 1589 – 1593)
- Fernando Martins de Mascarenhas (22 August 1594 – 4 July 1616)
- João Coutinho (20 November 1617 – 14 June 1627, transferred to Lamego)
- Francisco de Menezes (5 July 1627 – May 1633)
- Francisco Barreto I (9 June 1636 – 4 November 1649)
  - Sede vacante (1649–1671)
- Francisco Barreto II (19 January 1671 – August 1679)
- José de Menezes (1 April 1680 – 14 May 1685, transferred to Lamego)
- Simão da Gama (4 June 1685 – 1 October 1703, transferred to Évora)
- António Pereira da Silva (15 September 1704 – 17 April 1715)
- José Pereira de Lacerda (8 June 1716 – 28 September 1738)
- Inácio de Santa Teresa (19 December 1740 – 15 April 1751)
- Lourenço de Santa Maria (15 May 1752 – 5 December 1783)
- André Teixeira Palha (5 December 1783 succeduto – 19 November 1786)
- José Maria de Melo (23 April 1787 – 30 March 1789)
- Francisco Gomes de Avelar (30 March 1789 – 15 December 1816)
  - Sede vacante (1816–1819)
- Joaquim de Sant'Ana Carvalho (17 December 1819 – 23 November 1823)
- Inocêncio António das Neves Portugal (24 November 1823 – 30 March 1824)
- Bernardo Antônio de Figueiredo (20 December 1824 – 8 April 1838)
  - Sede vacante (1838–1844)
- António Bernardo da Fonseca Moniz (22 January 1844 – 23 June 1854, transferred to Porto)
- Carlos Cristóvão Genuês Pereira (28 September 1855 – 27 April 1863)
- Inácio do Nascimento Morais Cardoso (28 September 1863 – 25 April 1871, transferred to Lisbon)
  - Sede vacante (1871–1884)
- António Mendes Bello (13 November 1884 – 19 December 1907, transferred to Lisbon)
- António Barbosa Leão (19 December 1907 – 16 July 1919, transferred to Porto)
- Marcellino António Maria Franco (15 May 1920 – 3 December 1955)
- Francisco Rendeiro (3 December 1955 succeduto – 15 July 1965)
- Júlio Tavares Rebimbas (27 September 1965 – 1 July 1972)
- Florentino de Andrade e Silva (1 July 1972 – 4 April 1977)
- Ernesto Gonçalves Costa (4 April 1977 – 21 April 1988)
- Manuel Madureira Dias (21 April 1988 – 22 April 2004)
- Manuel Neto Quintas (22 April 2004 – 14 July 2026), retired
- Vitorino José Pereira Soares (14 July 2026 – Present)
