= Francisco de São Luís =

Portuguese cardinal (1766–1845)

His Eminence Frei Francisco de São Luís OSB GCC
- Cardinal, Patriarch of Lisbon
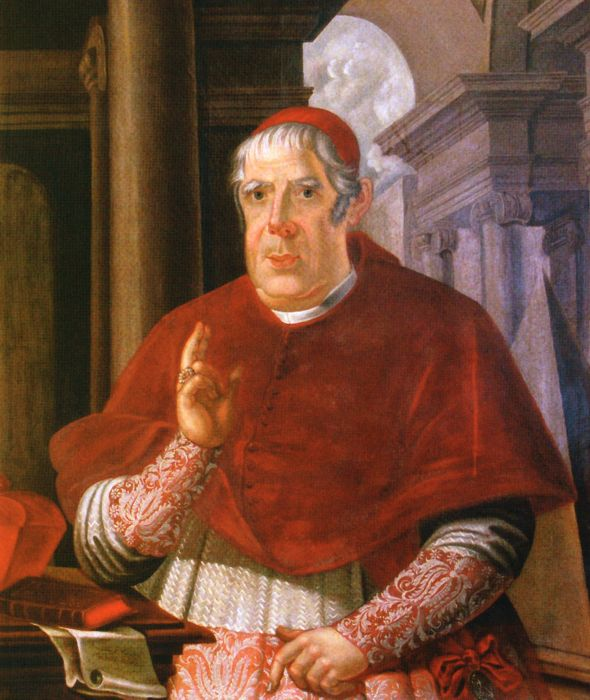
- Church: Patriarchal Cathedral of Saint Mary Major
- Archdiocese: Lisbon
- Appointed: 3 April 1843
- Predecessor: Patrício da Silva
- Successor: Guilherme Henriques de Carvalho
- Previous post: Bishop of Coimbra (1822–1824)

Orders
- Ordination: 7 March 1789
- Consecration: 15 September 1822 by Vicente da Soledade e Castro
- Created cardinal: 19 June 1843 by Pope Gregory XVI
- Rank: Cardinal-Priest

Personal details
- Born: Francisco Manuel Justiniano Saraiva; 26 January 1766 Ponte de Lima, Portugal
- Died: 7 May 1845 (aged 79) Lisbon, Portugal
- Buried: Pantheon of the Patriarchs of Lisbon
- Denomination: Roman Catholic

Frei Francisco de São Luís, O.S.B. GCC (26 January 1766 – 7 May 1845), religious name of Francisco Manuel Justiniano Saraiva and today more commonly known as Cardinal Saraiva (Portuguese: Cardeal Saraiva), was a Portuguese Cardinal of the Catholic Church, who was the eighth Patriarch of Lisbon from 1840 (only preconised by the Holy See in 1843) to 1845.

An eminent figure of Portuguese society in his day, he became politically active after the French invasion during the Peninsular War, and became one of the founders of the liberal regime. During the Constitutional Monarchy, he occupied several important political offices, such as that of President of the Chamber of Deputies (1826-1828; 1834), Minister of the Kingdom (1834-1835), and Peer of the Realm (from 1835).

As a researcher and author, Cardinal Saraiva was an authority in the fields of philology and history: his ten-volume Complete Works (published posthumously in 1856-1878) were standard reference works for more than a century.

== Biography ==
Francisco Manuel Justiniano Saraiva was the son of notary Manuel José Saraiva and his wife Leonor Maria Teodora Correia; born on 26 January 1766 in Rua das Flores, Ponte de Lima, he was baptized on 9 February in the town's Parish Church of Our Lady of the Angels (Nossa Senhora dos Anjos).

At age 14, he joined the Monastery of São Martinho de Tibães, mother house of the Benedictines in Portugal, due to his "gifts of organ and plainsong". He made his religious vows on 29 January 1782, adopting the religious name Francisco de São Luís (Francis of Saint Louis). He was transferred to the Monastery of Santo André de Rendufe to carry on his studies in Philosophy. He earned a degree in Theology from the University of Coimbra in 1791, and soon after started teaching there.

Saraiva was an advocate of the ideals of Liberalism and Enlightenment. While it is often said that he had become a Freemason (historian Oliveira Marques has written that Saraiva was initiated in a Coimbra lodge sometime before 1821, having adopted Condorcet as his symbolic name), Saraiva himself has left texts denying any association.

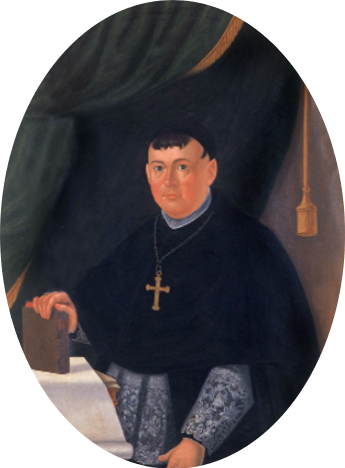
Francisco de São Luís as Bishop-Count and Rector of the University of Coimbra

In 1808, following the French invasion of Portugal, he was named part of the patriotic Junta that was established to administer the Minho region while the Council of Regency was not re-established in Lisbon. In 1820, as the Liberal Revolution erupted in the city of Porto, calling for a constitutional monarchy and the return of King John VI from Brazil, Francisco de São Luís was called to be part of the revolutionary Provisional Junta of the Supreme Government of the Kingdom and its successor, the 1821 Regency named by the elected General and Extraordinary Cortes.

As a result of the political instability of the time, the 1822 Constitution was suspended just one year later, following the Vilafrancada uprising. Saraiva renounced his public and ecclesiastical offices (he had been elected Deputy of the Nation and made Bishop-Count of Coimbra, as well as Rector of the University of Coimbra) and retired to the Batalha Monastery. He would only return to politics in 1826, after the King granted a new Constitutional Charter, having been again elected to the Chamber of Deputies. When the absolutist Miguel I seized power in 1828, Saraiva once again retreated to monastic life, in the Convent of Serra de Ossa in the Alentejo, where he remained until the end of the Portuguese Civil War.

After the civil war ended in 1834 and constitutional monarchy was established, Saraiva was once again actively involved in politics: he was elected to the Chamber of Deputies in 1834, 1836, and 1838; from 1834 to 1835 he was made Minister of the Kingdom in the Duke of Palmela's first constitutional cabinet.

In the aftermath of the civil war, the liberal regime stripped many privileges away from the Church, and Saraiva had an important role in the re-establishment of diplomatic relations with the Holy See. Saraiva was appointed Patriarch of Lisbon by Queen Maria II under the Padroado system in 1840; Pope Gregory XVI confirmed his appointment in a consistory on 3 April 1841, and wrote to Saraiva concerning his appointment on 29 August 1841 in his letter In consistorio. The appointment was preconised by Gregory XVI in his bull Onerosa pastoralis, issued on 3 April 1843. Later that same year, on 19 June 1843, Saraiva was made a Cardinal.

== Distinctions ==
=== National orders ===
- Grand Cross of the Order of Christ (December 1834)

Catholic Church titles
Preceded by Francisco de Lemos de Faria Pereira Coutinho	Roman Catholic Bishop of Coimbra; 1822–1824	Succeeded by Joaquim de Nossa Senhora da Nazaré
Preceded by Patrício da Silva	Patriarch of Lisbon; 1840–1845	Succeeded by Guilherme Henriques de Carvalho
