= Igreja de São João Baptista (Alcochete) =

Church in Alcochete Municipality, Setúbal District, Portugal

Coordinates: 38.7548362°N 8.9639896°W

Igreja de São João Baptista is a church in Portugal. It is classified as a National Monument.
