= San Domenico di Guzmán, Rome =

San Domenico di Guzman
- Church of Saint Dominic de Guzmán
- Chiesa di San Domenico di Guzmán
- Location within Rome
- 41°58′55″N 12°33′33″E
- Location: Via Vincenzo Marmorale 25, Rome
- Country: Italy
- Language: Italian
- Denomination: Catholic
- Tradition: Roman Rite
- Website: iclesia.com/churches/parrocchia-san-domenico-di-guzman

History
- Status: titular church
- Dedication: Saint Dominic
- Consecrated: 2 September 2000

Architecture
- Architect: Malcher Biagini
- Architectural type: Modern
- Completed: 2000

Administration
- Diocese: Rome

See San Domenico di Guzman for namesakes

San Domenico di Guzman is a cardinal-deaconry (titular church for a Cardinal-deacon) and parish church in Rome, dedicated to Saint Dominic of Guzman.

== Church ==
The church at Via Vincenzo Marmorale 25, in the tenth prefecture of northern Rome, was consecrated on 2 December 2000, to pastorally serve a parish created on 9 February 1977 in the Pope's own Diocese of Rome.

== Cardinal-deaconry ==
The title was established as cardinal-deaconry (i.e. for a cardinal-deacon) on 18 February 2012.

- (Portuguese) Cardinal-deacon Manuel Monteiro de Castro (18 February 2012 – present)

== Sources and external links ==
- GCatholic Cardinal deaconry, with incumbent biography links ^{[self-published]}
- GCatholic Church ^{[self-published]}
- diocesan page (in Italian) on Rome's diocesan website
