= António Mendes Belo =

Portuguese prelate

His Eminence António Mendes Belo
- Cardinal, Patriarch of Lisbon
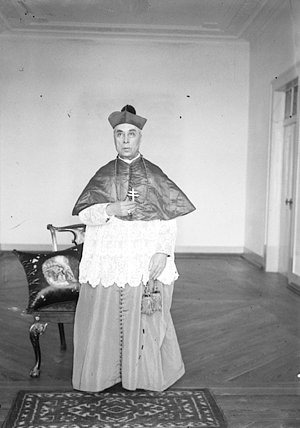
- Belo pictured in 1910
- Church: Roman Catholic Church
- Archdiocese: Lisbon
- See: Lisbon
- Appointed: 19 December 1907
- Installed: 5 March 1908
- Term ended: 5 August 1929
- Predecessor: José Sebastião Neto
- Successor: Manuel Gonçalves Cerejeira
- Other post: Cardinal-Priest of Santi Marcellino e Pietro (1914–29)
- Previous posts: Apostolic Administrator of Pinhel (1874–81); Titular Bishop of Mytilene (1884); Auxiliary Bishop of Lisbon (1884); Archbishop-Bishop of Faro (1884–1907)

Orders
- Ordination: 10 June 1865
- Consecration: 27 April 1884 by José Sebastião Neto
- Created cardinal: 27 November 1911 (in pectore); 25 May 1914 (revealed) by Pope Pius X
- Rank: Cardinal-Priest

Personal details
- Born: António Mendes Belo; 18 June 1842 São Pedro, Gouveia, Guarda, Kingdom of Portugal
- Died: 5 August 1929 (aged 87) Lisbon, Portuguese First Republic
- Education: University of Coimbra

Styles of António Mendes Belo
- Reference style: His Eminence
- Spoken style: Your Eminence
- Informal style: Cardinal
- See: Lisbon

António Mendes Belo (18 June 1842 – 5 August 1929) was a Portuguese prelate of the Catholic Church, who served as Patriarch of Lisbon from 1907 until his death. He was made a Cardinal of the Roman Catholic Church in 1911, though his elevation to that rank was not announced until 1914. He was Auxiliary Bishop of Lisbon from 1884 to 1888 and Archbishop of Faro from 1888 to 1906.

== Biography ==
António Mendes Belo was born at São Pedro, Gouveia, (District of Guarda), Kingdom of Portugal. He was son of Miguel Mendes Belo and wife Rosalina dos Santos de Almeida da Mota. He was educated at the Seminary of Coimbra, and later at the University of Coimbra where he earned a licentiate in canon law. He received minor orders on 21 December 1860, the subdiaconate on 21 May 1864 and the diaconate on 17 December 1864.

He was ordained on 10 June 1865. From 1865 to 1884 he was vicar general of Funchal and from 1865 to 1871, professor of theology at the Seminary of Pinhel. (Note: This diocese was suppressed on 30 September 1881 and its territory incorporated into the Diocese of Guarda.) He did pastoral work in the parish of Espinheiro. He was vicar general of the diocese of Pinhel from 1874 until 1881 and of the Diocese of Aveiro in 1881. He was also vicar general of Lisbon from 1881 until 1884.

He was appointed titular archbishop of Mitylene and Auxiliary bishop of Lisbon on 24 March 1884 by Pope Leo XIII. He was consecrated on 27 April of that year. He was transferred to the Diocese of Faro with title of Archbishop ad personam on 13 November 1884. He was named patriarch of Lisbon on 19 December 1907 by Pope Pius X.

He was made a cardinal in pectore on 27 November 1911. He had been expelled from Lisbon earlier that year for an infraction of the law of the separation of Church and State during which time he resided in Gouveia. The government relaxed its anticlerical campaign and allowed him to return to Lisbon in 1913. His elevation to the rank of Cardinal-Priest of Ss. Marcellino e Pietro was published on 25 May 1914. He received the red hat from Pope Benedict XV on 8 September 1914.

He participated in the conclave of 1914 that elected Pope Benedict XV. He was a member of Portuguese Academy of Sciences in 1922. He participated in the conclave of 1922 that elected Pope Pius XI. He was made the 568th Grand Cross of the Royal Order of Our Lady of Concepcion of Vila Viçosa. He died in Lisbon in 1929.

== Notes ==
Catholic Church titles
Preceded by Inácio do Nascimento Morais Cardoso	Bishop of Faro; 13 November 1884 – 19 December 1907	Succeeded by António Barbosa Leão
Preceded by José Sebastião de Almeida Neto	Patriarch of Lisbon; 19 December 1907 – 5 August 1929	Succeeded by Manuel Gonçalves Cerejeira
