= Patriarch of Lisbon =

Catholic ecclesiastical office in Portugal

Patriarch of Lisbon Patriarcha Olisiponensis Patriarca de Lisboa
- Archbishopric

catholic
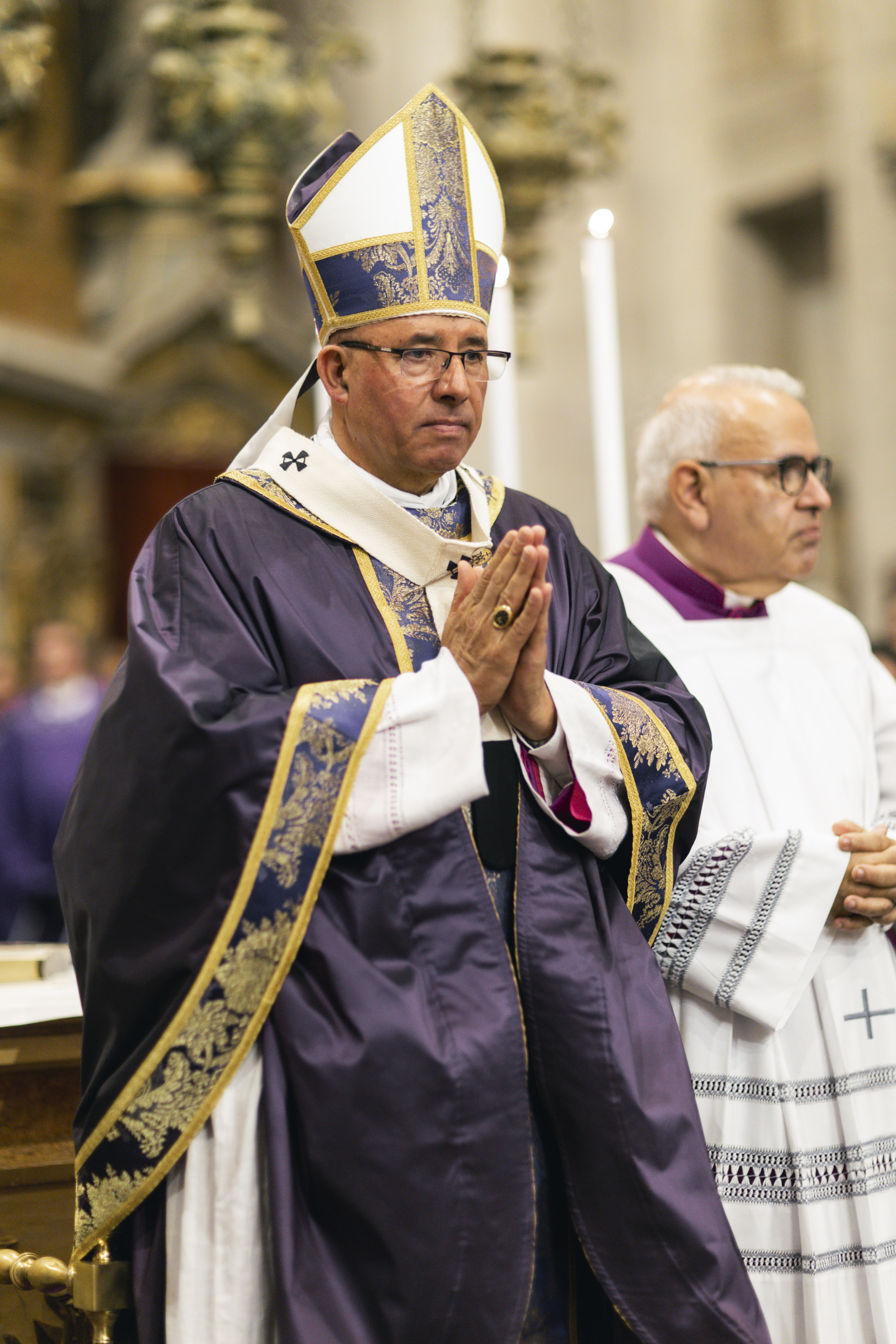
- Rui I, the current Patriarch of Lisbon

- Coat of arms
- Incumbent; Patriarch Rui I of Lisbon

Location
- Country: Portugal
- Ecclesiastical province: Patriarchate of Lisbon

Information
- First holder: Tomás de Almeida
- Denomination: Catholic
- Established: 1716
- Diocese: Patriarchate of Lisbon
- Cathedral: Patriarchal Cathedral of St. Mary Major

Website
- www.patriarcado-lisboa.pt

The Patriarch of Lisbon (Latin: Patriarcha Olisiponensis, Portuguese: Patriarca de Lisboa), also called the Cardinal-Patriarch of Lisbon once he has been made cardinal, is the ordinary bishop of the Archdiocese of Lisbon. He is one of the few patriarchs in the Latin Church of the Catholic Church, along with the Patriarchs of Venice, the East Indies, and Jerusalem.

The diocese of Lisbon was created in the 4th century, but it lay vacant after 716 when the city was captured by the Moors; the diocese was restored when the city was captured by king Afonso I of Portugal during the Second Crusade in 1147. In 1393, Lisbon was raised to the dignity of a metropolitan archdiocese by Pope Boniface IX with the papal bull In eminentissimae dignitatis. In 1716, at the request of King John V, Pope Clement XI issued the bull In Supremo Apostolatus Solio granting the rank of Patriarch to the King's Chaplain, who had since been made Archbishop of West Lisbon.

The bull Inter praecipuas apostolici ministerii, issued by Pope Clement XII in 1737, established that whoever was appointed Patriarch of Lisbon was to be elevated to the rank of cardinal at the next consistory. Lisbon was the only episcopal see to enjoy this distinction, while other patriarchs are made cardinals by custom only. However, neither Pope Francis nor Pope Leo followed this tradition and as of July 2026 the current Patriarch had not yet been made a Cardinal.

== Insignia of the Metropolitan Patriarch of Lisbon ==
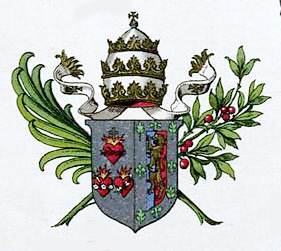
Coat of arms of Patriarch José de Almeida Neto, featuring the papal tiara

The See of Lisbon has been granted extraordinary ceremonial privileges. The Patriarchs of Lisbon were entitled to unique rights of vesture and ceremony that imitated the grandeur of the papal court: notably, the cassocks of his cathedral canons were scarlet (like those of cardinals), and his chapter has three orders like those of the College of Cardinals.

Among the unique privileges granted to the Patriarch of Lisbon (and never withdrawn, though most have fallen into disuse) were the right to wear the fanon, subcinctorium and falda, vestments otherwise reserved for the Pope. A unique mitre, similar to the papal tiara, was conceded at the same time. The Patriarch was also allowed to use a sedia gestatoria along with two flabella for processions — the practice of receiving Holy Communion at the throne in solemn Masses was not conceded to the Patriarch of Lisbon, however.

Also notably, the Patriarch of Lisbon can use a papal tiara (without the cross keys of Saint Peter) over his coat of arms; this custom has fallen out of use since the 1970s.

== List of Patriarchs of Lisbon ==
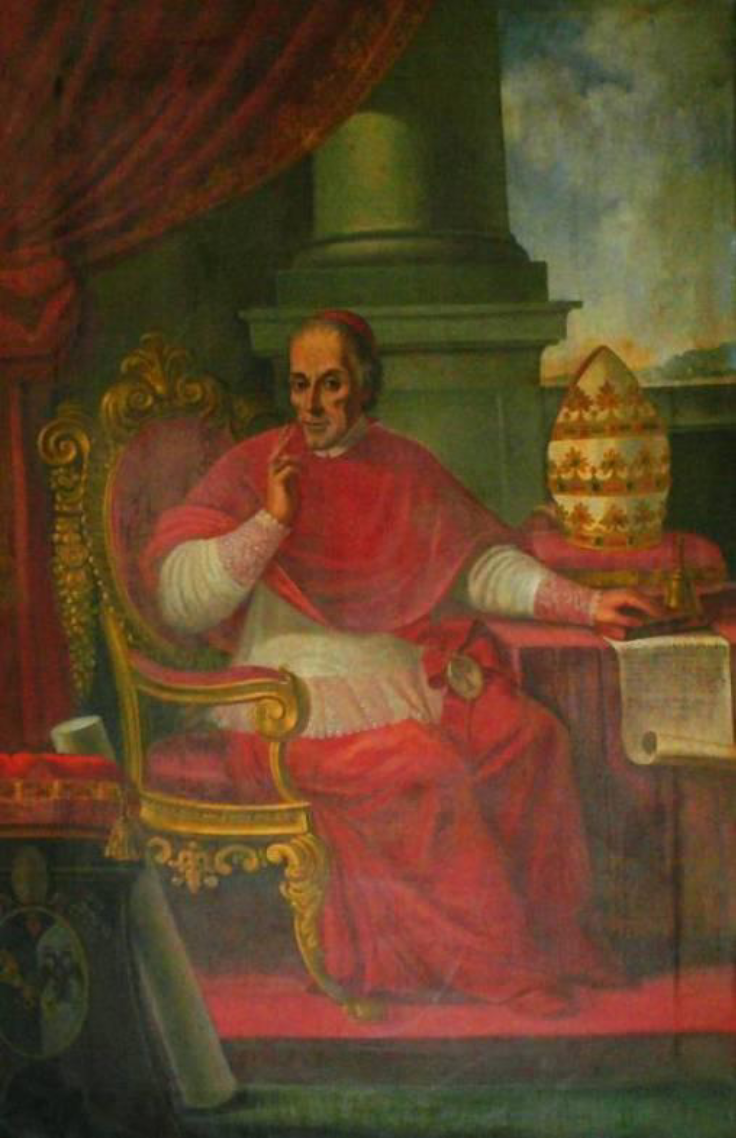
Portrait of Patriarch Patrício da Silva (r. 1826–1840), featuring the three-tiered patriarchal mitre that is reminiscent of the Papal tiara

1. Tomás de Almeida (1716–1754)
2. José (I) Manoel da Câmara (1754–1758)
3. Francisco (I) de Saldanha da Gama (1758–1776)
4. Fernando de Sousa da Silva (1779–1786)
5. José (II) Francisco Miguel António de Mendonça (1786–1808)
6. António de São José de Castro (1808–1814) (never consecrated)
7. Carlos da Cunha e Meneses (1819–1825)
8. Patrício da Silva (1826–1840)
9. Francisco (II) de São Luís (Francisco Justiniano) Saraiva (1840–1845)
10. Guilherme Henriques de Carvalho (1845–1857)
11. Manuel (I) Bento Rodrigues da Silva (1858–1869)
12. Inácio do Nascimento de Morais Cardoso (1871–1883)
13. José (III) Sebastião de Almeida Neto (1883–1907)
14. António (I) Mendes Belo (1907–1929)
15. Manuel (II) Gonçalves Cerejeira (1929–1971)
16. António (II) Ribeiro (1971–1998)
17. José (IV) da Cruz Policarpo (1998–2013)
18. Manuel (III) José Macário do Nascimento Clemente (2013–2023)
19. Rui (I) Manuel Sousa Valério (2023–present).
