= Guilherme Henriques de Carvalho =

Portuguese cardinal (1766–1845)

His Eminence Guilherme Henriques de Carvalho
- Cardinal, Patriarch of Lisbon
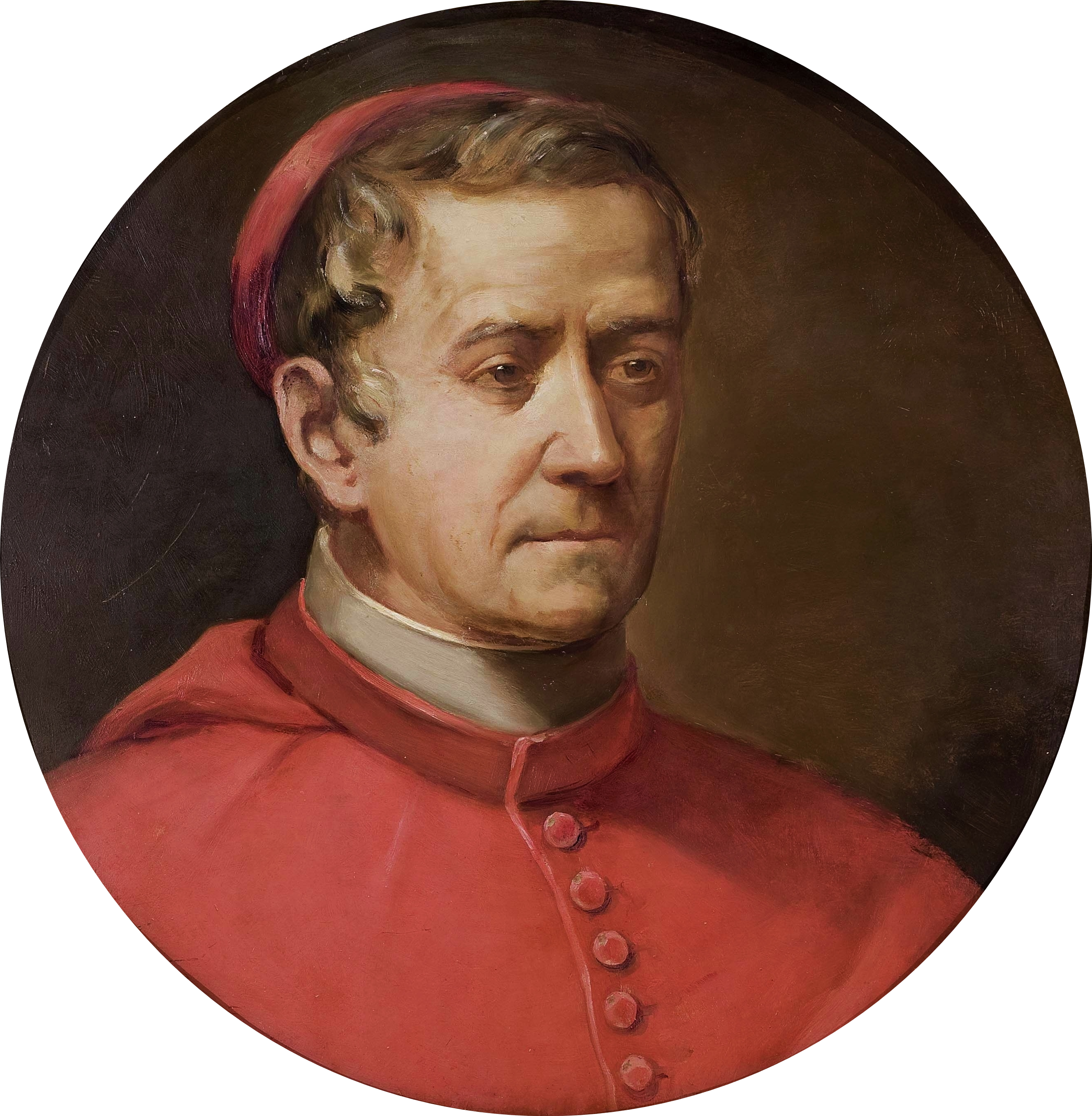
- Portrait of Cardinal-Patriarch D. Guilherme, at the São Bento Palace
- Church: Patriarchal Cathedral of Saint Mary Major
- Archdiocese: Lisbon
- Appointed: 24 December 1845
- Predecessor: Francisco de São Luís
- Successor: Manuel Bento Rodrigues da Silva
- Previous post: Bishop of Leiria (1843–1845)

Orders
- Ordination: 5 June 1819
- Consecration: 2 July 1843 by Francisco de São Luís
- Created cardinal: 19 January 1846 by Pope Gregory XVI
- Rank: Cardinal-Priest

Personal details
- Born: 1 February 1793 Coimbra, Portugal
- Died: 15 November 1857 (aged 64) Lisbon, Portugal
- Buried: Pantheon of the Patriarchs of Lisbon
- Denomination: Roman Catholic

Guilherme Henriques de Carvalho (Coimbra, 1 February 1793 – Lisbon, 15 November 1857) was a Portuguese Cardinal, politician and ninth Patriarch of Lisbon, serving under the name D. Guilherme I

== Biography ==
He was the son of José Ribeiro dos Santos and his wife, Ana Joaquina da Soledade, married in Coimbra, at the parish of Santiago, on 27 April 1782.

He studied law at the University of Coimbra in 1808, but interrupted his studies to fight the French invasion until its defeat in 1814. After the war, he returned to the university and obtained a doctorate in canon law, on 23 July 1815. He was ordained a priest on 5 June 1819, but was also politically active.
Following the Revolution of 1820, Dr. Henriques de Carvalho was elected as a deputy for the Beira region to the Cortes Gerais (parliament) established in 1821. A professor since 1830, he was again elected as a deputy in 1838 and served as President of the chamber. He was re-elected following the dissolution of the Cortes in 1840.

He served as Bishop of Leiria from 1843 until 1845, when was elected 9th Patriarch of Lisbon. He also held the position of Apostolic Administrator for the Diocese of Portalegre-Castelo Branco, which was vacant at the time (1848–1857). He also held the title of Prior of Crato within the Sovereign Military Order of Malta.

He held the presidency of the Chamber of Peers, served as a member of the Council of State, presided over the General Council of Charity, and sat on numerous other commissions, councils, and extraordinary boards. He was also frequently consulted by the government on various significant matters unrelated to his specific offices and titles.

In 1846, Pope Gregory XVI named him a cardinal. However, due to the Pope's death, the honor was formally conferred by his successor, Pope Pius IX, who bestowed the cardinal's hat upon him, after the 1846 conclave in which Carvalho didn't participate. In 1854, he was appointed Cardinal-Priest of Santa Maria sopra Minerva.

While in Rome, he also participated in the definition of the dogma of the Immaculate Conception, which was established on 8 December 1854.

He passed away on 15 November 1857, at the age of 64, a victim of yellow fever.

Since the mid-20th century, his remains have rested in the Pantheon of the Patriarchs of Lisbon.
