= António Ribeiro (cardinal) =

Portuguese cardinal

His Eminence Antonio II
- Cardinal, Patriarch of Lisbon
- Church: Roman Catholic
- Archdiocese: Lisbon
- Installed: 1971
- Term ended: 24 March 1998
- Predecessor: Manuel Gonçalves Cerejeira
- Successor: José Policarpo
- Other post: Cardinal-Priest of Sant’Antonio da Padova in Via Merulana

Orders
- Ordination: 5 July 1953
- Consecration: 17 Sep 1967
- Created cardinal: 5 Mar 1973 by Paul VI
- Rank: Cardinal-Priest

Personal details
- Born: 21 May 1928 Gandarela de Basto, Portugal
- Died: 24 March 1998 (aged 69) Lisbon, Portugal
- Buried: Monastery of São Vicente de Fora
- Coat of arms

Styles of António Ribeiro
- Reference style: His Eminence
- Spoken style: Your Eminence
- Informal style: Cardinal
- See: Lisbon

Dom António II Ribeiro (21 May 1928 – 24 March 1998) was a Portuguese cardinal of the Roman Catholic Church, and Patriarch of Lisbon from 1971 until his death in 1998.

Born at São Clemente de Basto, Celorico de Basto, son of José Ribeiro (born ca 1860) and wife Ana Gonçalves (born ca 1904), both from the same location, Ribeiro was ordained a priest of the Braga Archdiocese on 5 July 1953. Fourteen years later, on 3 July 1967, he was appointed Auxiliary bishop of Braga as titular bishop of Tigillava, and ordained on 17 September.

Ribeiro graduated with a degree in Theology from the Pontifical Gregorian University of Rome. His doctoral thesis, defended in 1959, was on The Doctrine of Errors in Saint Thomas Aquinas. Transferred from Braga to Lisbon, he was appointed chaplain of one of the branches of Catholic Action (LUC/F), and lectured at the Instituto Superior de Cultura Católica, and at the Instituto Superior de Ciências Sociais e Políticas, of the Technical University of Lisbon. He also visited the Theological Faculties of Innsbruck and Munich.

Meanwhile, in 1960 he took on a weekly tv program called Dia do Senhor (The Lord's Day), and collaborated with several religious magazines and newspapers, beyond his own publications.

On Manuel Gonçalves Cerejeira's retirement as Patriarch in 1971, Ribeiro was appointed his successor and, a year later, also Vicar Apostolic of the Portuguese Military. He was created Cardinal-Priest of Sant'Antonio da Padova in Via Merulana by Pope Paul VI, on 5 March 1973, which made him, at the age of 44, the youngest cardinal in the XXth century since Cerejeira himself, forty-four years earlier. As such, he participated in the 1978 August and October Conclaves. In 1991, he was appointed as the papal envoy to the 5th Centennial Celebration of Evangelization, in Luanda, Angola.

Recognised as a man of compromise (and markedly less close to the Estado Novo government than Cerejeira had been), Ribeiro was nevertheless very determined in defending the rights and privileges of the Church in his country.

He died of cancer in Lisbon in 1998 at age 69 and is buried in the tomb of the patriarchs in the Monastery of São Vicente de Fora. He was the Principal Consecrator in 1978 of José da Cruz Policarpo, who succeeded him as Patriarch, and in 1989 of Januário Ferreira, who succeeded him as Military vicar of Portugal in 2001.

Catholic Church titles
Preceded by Manuel Gonçalves Cerejeira	Patriarch of Lisbon; 1971–1998	Succeeded by José da Cruz Policarpo
