= Manuel I, Patriarch of Lisbon =

His Eminence Manuel I
- Cardinal, Patriarch of Lisbon
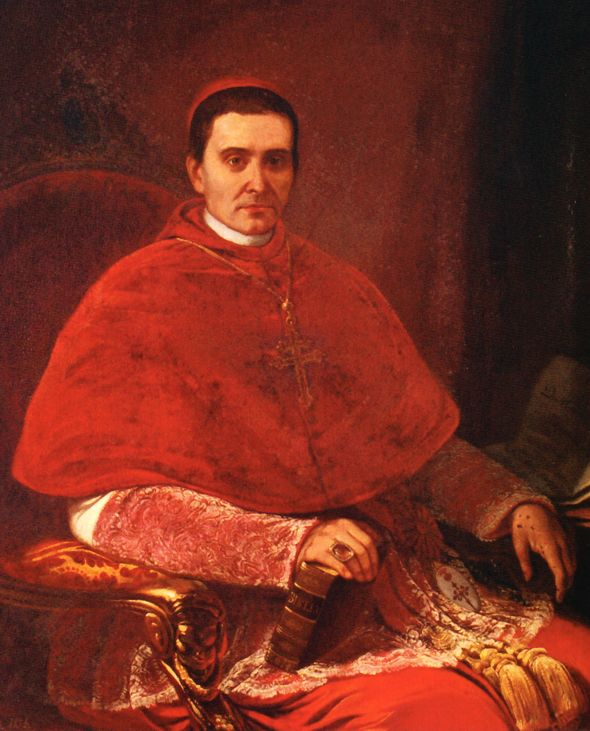
- Archdiocese: Archdiocese of Lisbon
- Appointed: 18 March 1858
- In office: 18 March 1858 to 26 September 1869
- Predecessor: Guilherme Henriques de Carvalho
- Successor: Inácio do Nascimento de Morais Cardoso

Orders
- Ordination: 11 March 1826
- Consecration: 25 June 1858 by Guilherme Henriques de Carvalho
- Created cardinal: 25 June 1858 by Pope Pius IX
- Rank: Cardinal-Priest

Personal details
- Born: Manuel Bento Rodrigues da Silva; December 25, 1800 Vila Nova de Gaia, Kingdom of Portugal
- Died: 26 September 1869 (aged 68) Lisbon, Portugal
- Buried: Pantheon of the Patriarchs, Monastery of São Vicente de Fora, Lisbon
- Denomination: Roman Catholic
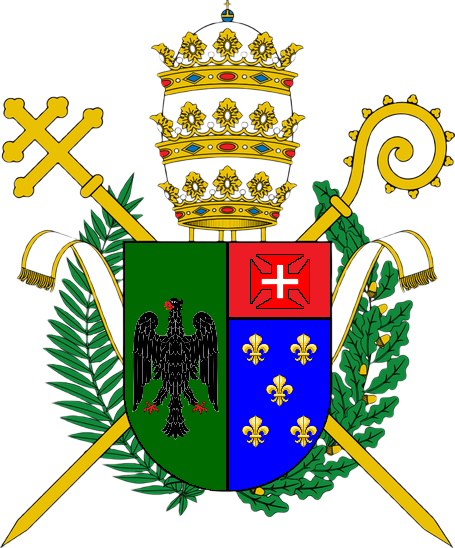
- Coat of arms

Manuel Bento Rodrigues da Silva, CSJE (Vila Nova de Gaia, 25 December 1800 - Lisbon, 26 September 1869) was the tenth Patriarch of Lisbon named Manuel I.

He was successively titular Archbishop of Mitilene (1845), 55th Bishop of Coimbra and ex officio 20th Count of Arganil (in 1851), and finally Patriarch of Lisbon in 1858; that year he was also made a Cardinal by Pope Pius IX.

== Biography ==
He was born in Rua Direita, in Santa Marinha, Vila Nova de Gaia, on 25 December 1800, into a family from the local petty bourgeoisie, the son of José Bento Rodrigues Guimarães and his wife Ana de São José. He was orphaned by his father before his fifth birthday.

He entered the Congregation of the Secular Canons of St John the Evangelist at a very young age and was professed at the Beato António Convent in Lisbon. After his novitiate, he went to the school of his order in Coimbra. He received his doctorate in theology from the Faculty of Theology of the University of Coimbra on 30 July 1826.

He was initiated as a free mason into the Lusitanian Grand Orient.

He was ordained on 11 March 1826. In Coimbra, he was professor of history at the School of Arts, for ten years professor of theology at his university, member of the executive council of primary and secondary education. Pastor of parishes in the diocese of Porto. Chapter vicar of Elvas and Castelo Branco from 1841 to 10 September 1844. Provisor and vicar-general of Lisbon in 1844.

Elected titular archbishop of Mitilene and appointed auxiliary archbishop of Lisbon on 24 November 1845, he was consecrated on 22 February 1846 in the church of São Vicente de Fora by Cardinal Guilherme Henriques de Carvalho, patriarch of Lisbon. Transferred to the Cathedral of Coimbra with the personal title of archbishop on 15 March 1852, he became ex officio Count of Arganil.

Promoted to the patriarchal see of Lisbon on 18 March 1858, he was created cardinal-presbyter on 25 June, without however having received the galero and a titulus in Rome, but he did receive his barrette from King Pedro V in the Basilica of the Sacred Heart of Jesus in Lisbon. As the country's leading ecclesiastical figure, he officiated at the marriages of King Pedro V to Queen Stephanie, and of King Luís to Queen Maria Pia.

He died on 26 September 1869 and was buried in the Church of São Vicente de Fora. His body has been in the Pantheon of the Patriarchs of Lisbon since the middle of the 20th century.

== Titles and honours ==
=== Nobility ===
Ex-Officio 20th Count of Arganil

=== Honours ===
- Grand Cross of the Military Order of Saint James of the Sword of the Kingdom of Portugal and the Algarves
- Grand Cross of the Military Order of the Tower and Sword of Kingdom of Portugal and the Algarves
- Grand Cross of the Order of the Crown of Saxony of the Kingdom of Saxony
- Grand Collar of the Order of Saints Maurice and Lazarus of the Kingdom of Italy
