= José Sebastião de Almeida Neto =

Portuguese cardinal

His Eminence José III OFMDisc
- Cardinal, Patriarch of Lisbon
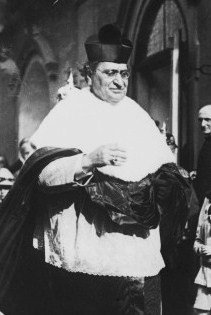
- Province: Lisbon
- Diocese: Lisbon
- See: Lisbon
- Appointed: 19 July 1883
- Installed: 9 August 1883
- Term ended: 7 November 1907
- Predecessor: Inácio do Nascimento de Morais Cardoso
- Successor: António Mendes Belo
- Other posts: Bishop of Angola and the Congo (1879-1883); Cardinal-Priest of Ss. XII Apostoli (1884-1920)

Orders
- Ordination: 1 April 1865
- Consecration: 18 April 1880 by Gaetano Aloisi Masella
- Created cardinal: 24 March 1884 by Leo XIII
- Rank: Cardinal-Priest

Personal details
- Born: José Sebastião de Almeida Neto; 8 February 1841 Lagos, Algarve; Kingdom of Portugal
- Died: 7 December 1920 (aged 79) Villarino, Andalusia; Kingdom of Spain
- Buried: Monastery of São Vicente de Fora; Lisbon, Portugal
- Denomination: Roman Catholic
- Motto: Soli Deo Omnis Honor et Gloria
- Coat of arms

Styles of José Sebastião de Almeida Neto
- Reference style: His Eminence
- Spoken style: Your Eminence
- Informal style: Cardinal
- See: Lisbon

José Sebastião de Almeida Neto (8 February 1841 – 7 December 1920) was a Cardinal of the Catholic Church and Patriarch of Lisbon.

== Early life ==
José Sebastião de Almeida Neto was born on 8 February 1841 in Lagos, Portugal, the son of Raimundo José Neto, a veteran of the Peninsular War, and his wife Lucy Catherine de Almeida. He was educated at the Seminary of Faro and received the sub-diaconate on 20 September 1862 and the diaconate on 21 May 1864.

== Priesthood ==
He was ordained on 1 April 1865. Neto entered the Order of Friars Minor Discalced on 15 August 1875, adopting the name of Joseph of the Sacred Heart, but continued to work in the parish church of St. Sebastian until 1879, upon his bishopric appointment.

== Episcopate ==
He was nominated as Bishop of Angola e Congo by Luís I of Portugal on 30 July 1879, the Pope confirmed him on 22 September of that year, but was not consecrated until 18 April of the following year, in St. Julian Church, Lisbon, by Gaetano Aloisi Masella, Apostolic Nuncio to Portugal. Aires Ornelas e Vasconcelos, Archbishop of Goa, and Jose Lino de Oliveira, Bishop-Emeritus of Angola. served as co-consecrators. He was nominated by the King of Portugal to the Patriarchate of Lisbon on 12 July 1883, with papal confirmation as patriarch occurring on 9 August.

== Cardinalate ==
In accordance with tradition that the Patriarch of Lisbon be made a cardinal, Pope Leo XIII raised him to that rank in the consistory of 24 March 1884. He received his red galero and was assigned the titular church of Santi Apostoli on 10 June 1886.

As the Patriarch of Lisbon he presided over the wedding of Prince Don Carlos with Amélie of Orléans, in the Church of St. Dominic in Lisbon on 22 May 1886. He participated in the conclave of 1903 that elected Pope Pius X.

In November 1907 Neto resigned and retired to a convent of his order. Due to religious persecution with the deployment of the first Republic he fled to Spain and as of 30 May 1913, was residing in the convent of Villarino of Ramallosa.

On 4 September 1913, at Sigmaringen Castle, he conducted the marriage of the exiled King Manuel II of Portugal (whom he had baptized, and given first communion and confirmation) and Manuel's second cousin, Augusta Victoria of Hohenzollern.

== Death and funeral ==
He died at 1:30 AM on 7 December 1920 in Villarino, near Seville, Spain. On 9 December, his body was transferred to Tui, Galicia, where it arrived at 05:00. The body was received by Bishop Manuel Lago de Tuy, several canons of the cathedral chapter and the Franciscan community of the Colegio de San Antonio. The coffin was placed on a catafalque in the middle of the cathedral. On 10 December, at 11 am, Mass of requiem was solemnly sung by Don Manuel Vieira de Matos, Archbishop of Braga. King Alfonso XIII of Spain ordered military honors for the Cardinal. After the Mass, the bishop of Tui delivered the funeral oration. The remains were buried in the crypt of the chapel of San Telmo, the tomb of the bishops of Tui. On 28 April 1928, the body was exhumed and solemnly translated to Lisbon, where he was buried on 30 April at the tomb of the patriarchs of the Monastery of São Vicente de Fora.

Catholic Church titles
Preceded by Inácio do Nascimento Morais Cardoso	Patriarch of Lisbon; 9 August 1883 – 1907	Succeeded by António Mendes Bello
