= Manuel Gonçalves Cerejeira =

Portuguese cardinal and Patriarch of Lisbon

His Eminence Manuel Gonçalves Cerejeira GCC GCSE GCIH
- Cardinal, Patriarch of Lisbon
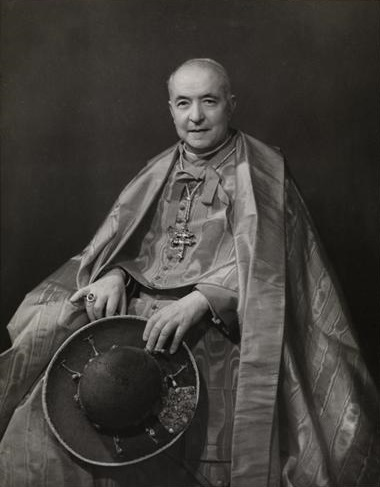
- Cardinal Cerejeira in 1960
- Archdiocese: Archdiocese of Lisbon
- Appointed: 1929
- In office: 5 August 1929 – 10 May 1971
- Predecessor: António Mendes Belo
- Successor: António Ribeiro

Orders
- Ordination: 1 April 1911
- Consecration: 17 June 1928 by Manuel Luís Coelho da Silva
- Created cardinal: 16 December 1929 by Pope Pius XI
- Rank: Cardinal-Priest

Personal details
- Born: Manuel Gonçalves Cerejeira; November 29, 1888 Lousado, Vila Nova de Famalicão, Kingdom of Portugal
- Died: 1 August 1977 (aged 88) Benfica, Lisbon, Portugal
- Buried: Pantheon of the Patriarchs, Monastery of São Vicente de Fora, Lisbon
- Denomination: Roman Catholic
- Signature: Manuel Gonçalves Cerejeira's signature

- Coat of arms: Manuel Gonçalves Cerejeira's coat of arms

Styles of Manuel Gonçalves Cerejeira
- Reference style: His Eminence
- Spoken style: Your Eminence
- Informal style: Cardinal
- See: Lisbon

Manuel Gonçalves Cerejeira, GCC, GCSE, GCIH (29 November 1888, Lousado, Vila Nova de Famalicão, Kingdom of Portugal – 1 August 1977, Benfica, Lisbon, Portugal) was a Portuguese cardinal who served as Patriarch of Lisbon from 1929 to 1971. His cardinalate of forty-eight years was the longest since the fifty-eight-year cardinalate of Henry Benedict Stuart, Cardinal-Duke of York which lasted from 1747 to 1805. He took part in three conclaves: in 1939, 1958, and 1963. Although there were seven other cardinals elevated by Pope Pius XI who participated in the 1963 conclave, Cerejeira was the longest-serving living cardinal from the death of Jozef-Ernest van Roey on 6 August 1961 until his own death almost exactly sixteen years later. He was the last living Cardinal appointed by Pius XI.

== Family ==
Cerejeira was the eldest of three sons and four daughters of Avelino Gonçalves Cerejeira (1857 – 1927), a merchant from Lugar da Serra, and his wife, Joaquina Gonçalves Rebelo (1864 – 1918). His mother had resided at the Parish of Lousado since her childhood and became a country woman (i.e., a peasant woman) upon marriage. Manuel's younger brothers were Júlio (b. 1901), a medical doctor, Joaquim, a lawyer, and António, a university employee. One of his younger sisters was a nun and one was called Carolina.

== Early life ==
He was educated at the seminary in Braga from a young age and became a priest in 1911. Following his ordination, he became a faculty member of the University of Coimbra, during which time he became a respected and revered intellectual and religious figure. He also met António de Oliveira Salazar and the two later became leading figures in the Centro Académico de Democracia Cristã (Academic Centre for Christian Democracy), which supported the Catholic Church's social doctrine.

== Career ==
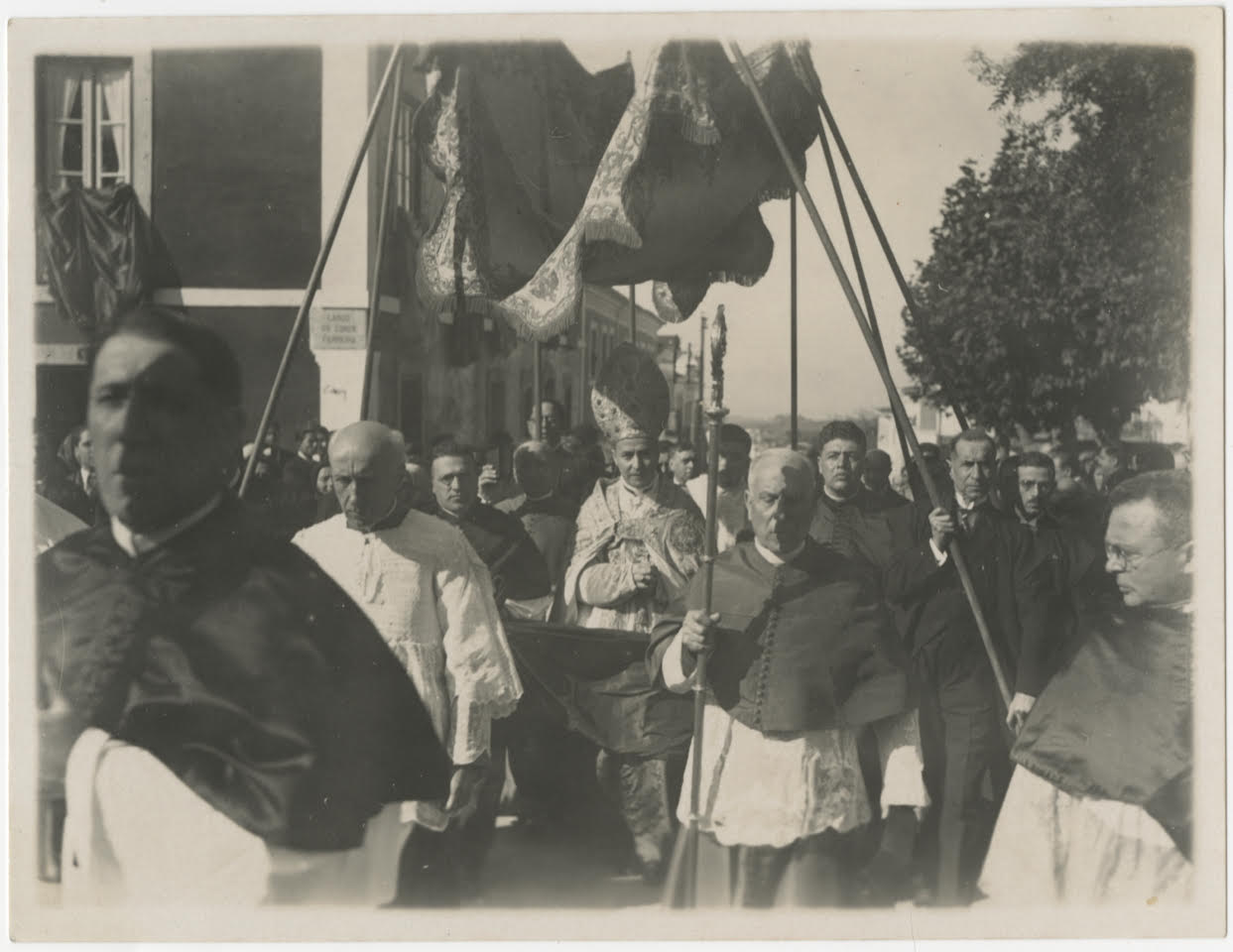
Manuel Gonçalves Cerejeira in 1930 (Archive of RVCMBSM)

In 1928, Cerejeira became a bishop and was elevated to the patriarchate of Lisbon the following year, at the age of forty-one. He replaced António Mendes Belo, who had experienced two very different periods during his twenty-year cardinalate: a time of anti-church hostility in the first years of the Portuguese republic and a more church-friendly climate following the military coup of 1926. Cerejeira was appointed cardinal on 16 December 1929, a month after his appointment as patriarch. At the time of his elevation, he became the youngest member of the College of Cardinals. The closest approach was made by António Ribeiro, his successor as Patriarch of Lisbon, who was made a cardinal in 1973, three months before his forty-fifth birthday.

During his extraordinarily long career as Portugal's leading Catholic churchman, Cerejeira often became associated with the authoritarian right-wing Estado Novo. This was the result of his friendship with Prime Minister António de Oliveira Salazar, who had been a university colleague of his at Coimbra, and his endorsement of many of the Estado Novo's policies. He signed the Concordat of 1940 between Portugal and the Catholic Church. However, although he was considered a conservative, he accepted the Vatican Council II reforms more readily than Salazar. He was criticized for not being more vocal on his support of the Bishop of Porto, António Ferreira Gomes, who was forced to a 10 years exile after having written a critical letter to the Portuguese dictator.

On January 1, 1971, he lost the right to participate in a conclave, having already reached age 80.

== Honours ==
- Grand-Cross of the Order of Christ, Portugal (March 5, 1932)
- Grand-Cross of the Order of Saint James of the Sword, Portugal (May 14, 1936)
- Grand-Cross of the Order of Prince Henry, Portugal (December 27, 1960)

== Bibliography ==
- Lusitania Sacra. 2a serie (in Portuguese). Vol. Tomo 2: Pensamento e obra do Cardeal Cerejaira. Lisboa: CEHR-UCP. 1990. GGKEY:EZ1X9XDG420. [collection, on centenary of birth of Cerejaira]

Catholic Church titles
Preceded by António Mendes Belo	Patriarch of Lisbon; 5 August 1929 – 10 May 1971	Succeeded by António Ribeiro
