= Inácio do Nascimento de Morais Cardoso =

His Eminence Inácio do Nascimento de Morais Cardoso
- Patriarch of Lisbon
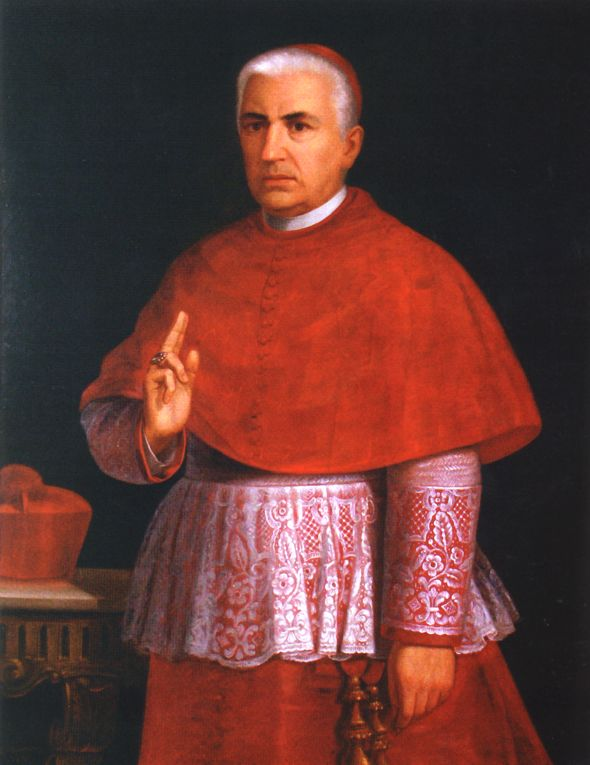
- Church: Roman Catholic Church
- Archdiocese: Lisbon
- See: Lisbon
- Appointed: 25 April 1871
- Installed: 19 June 1871
- Term ended: 23 February 1883
- Predecessor: Manuel Bento Rodrigues da Silva
- Successor: José Sebastião de Almeida Neto
- Other post: Cardinal-Priest of Santi Nereo e Achilleo (1873-83)
- Previous post: Bishop of Faro (1863-71)

Orders
- Ordination: 19 December 1835 by Joaquim de Nossa Senhora de Nazareth Oliveira e Abreu
- Consecration: 14 February 1864 by Manuel Bento Rodrigues da Silva
- Created cardinal: 22 December 1873 by Pope Pius IX
- Rank: Cardinal-Priest

Personal details
- Born: Inácio do Nascimento de Morais Cardoso; 20 December 1811 Murça, Kingdom of Portugal
- Died: 23 February 1883 (aged 71) Lisbon, Kingdom of Portugal
- Buried: Lisbon Cathedral
- Parents: Hipólito de Morais Cardoso; Eufémia Joaquina
- Education: University of Coimbra

Styles of Inácio do Nascimento de Morais Cardoso
- Reference style: His Eminence
- Spoken style: Your Eminence
- Informal style: Cardinal
- See: Lisbon

Dom Inácio do Nascimento de Morais Cardoso (20 December 1811 – 23 February 1883) was a Cardinal of the Roman Catholic Church and was Patriarch of Lisbon.

Morais Cardoso was born in Murça, Portugal, the son of Hipólito de Morais Cardoso, Captain-Major of Murça, and wife Eufémia Joaquina. He was educated at the University of Coimbra, where he was awarded a licentiate in theology.

== Priesthood ==
He was ordained on 19 December 1835. He served as treasurer of the church of São Roque da Misericórdia as well as chaplain and confessor of King Pedro V of Portugal and was treasurer of the Royal Chapel of the Palace of Necessidades.

== Episcopate ==
He was appointed as Bishop of Faro (or of Algarve) on 28 September 1863. He was consecrated on 14 February 1863 in Lisbon, by Cardinal Manuel Bento Rodrigues da Silva. He participated in the First Vatican Council that was called in Rome during 1869 to 1870. Morais Cardoso was promoted to the patriarchal see of Lisbon on 25 April 1871.

== Cardinalate ==
He was created and proclaimed Cardinal-Priest of Santi Nereo e Achilleo in the consistory of 22 December 1873 by Pope Pius IX. He participated in the conclave of 1878 that elected Pope Leo XIII. He died in Lisbon in 1883.

Catholic Church titles
Preceded by Manuel Bento Rodrigues da Silva	Patriarch of Lisbon; 25 August 1871 – 23 February 1883	Succeeded by José Sebastião de Almeida Neto
