= José Manuel da Câmara de Atalaia =

Portuguese Catholic cardinal (1686–1758)

His Eminence José Manuel da Câmara de Atalaia
- Cardinal, Patriarch of Lisbon
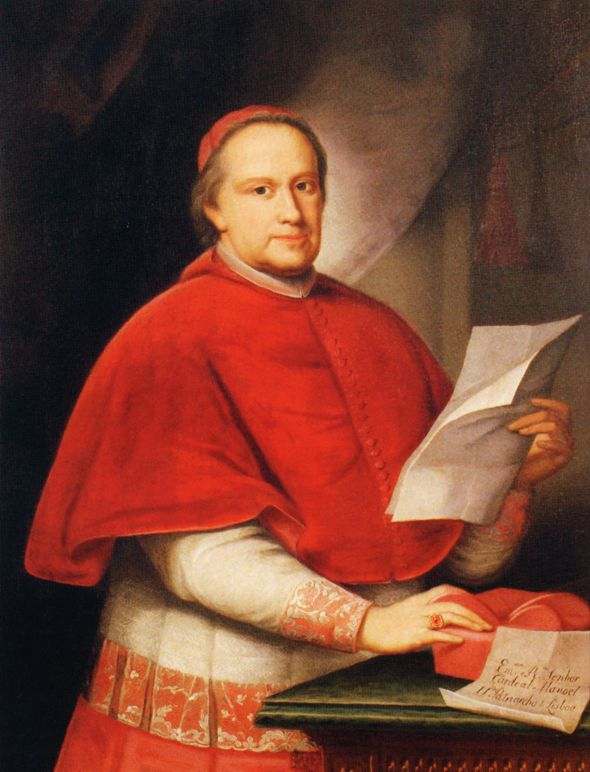
- Church: Roman Catholic Church
- Archdiocese: Lisbon
- See: Cathedral of St. Mary Major
- Installed: 20 May 1754
- Term ended: 9 July 1758
- Predecessor: Tomás de Almeida
- Successor: Francisco I de Saldanha da Gama

Personal details
- Born: 25 December 1686 Lisbon, Portugal
- Died: 9 July 1758 (aged 71) Atalaia, Portugal
- Education: Colegio de São Pedro

Styles of José Manuel da Câmara de Atalaia
- Reference style: His Eminence
- Spoken style: Your Eminence
- Religious style: Cardinal
- Informal style: Cardinal

D. José Manuel da Câmara de Atalaia (Lisbon, December 25, 1686 - Atalaia, July 9, 1758), was the second Patriarch of Lisbon, with the name of D. José I. Benedict XIV made him a cardinal on 10 April 1747.

== Biography ==
He was the son of D. Luís Manoel de Távora, 4th Count of Atalaia, and his second wife D. Francisca Leonor de Mendonça, consanguineous brother of the 5th Count and brother of the 6th Count and 1st Marquis de Tancos.

He studied in the Colegio de São Pedro, in Coimbra, of the Terceira Order of São Francisco.

Named for service in the Royal Chapel, where he was sumilher da cortina. On 15 May 1710, King João V of Portugal appointed him dean of the Royal Chapel, which had recently been built as a collegiate church of São Tomé on 1 March of that year. On 7 November 1716, the Royal Chapel became a patriarchal metropolitan See by the papal bull In supremo apostolatus and José Manuel became a member of the Sacred College of Principals, and as its rector, he presided over the Te Deum, in which for the first time all the dignities used habits of prelate.

Assigned as a judge of the Supreme Court of the Inquisition of Lisbon, and president of the Great Curia. Deputy for the Board of the Three States and Ombudsman of Atalaia. Named by the King, primarius principalis of the cathedral church of Lisbon, and protonotary apostolic. He was promoted to the cardinalate at the request of King João V, and was created cardinal-priest in the consistory of 10 April 1747, with a brief apostolic of 17 April 1747, Monsignor Carlo Livizzani took the cardinal's cap to Lisbon, since he never went to Rome to receive the cap and the title. It was presented by King Joseph I of Portugal to the patriarchal See of Lisbon, on 9 March 1754.

Elected Patriarch of Lisbon on 20 May 1754, he received the canopy the same day. He took office on 2 June and was consecrated on 25 July in Lisbon by Cardinal Lucas Melchor Tempi, titular archbishop of Nicomedia, apostolic nuncio to Portugal, assisted by Jose Henriques, bishop of Constantine, and Hilário of Santa Rosa, ex-bishop of Macau. After he became the patriarch, he did not use his surname again. On Saturday, 7 September 1754, he solemnly entered the Cathedral.

He lived through the Earthquake of 1755.

He died on 9 July 1758, three days after the 1758 Conclave, which he did not attend. He was laid in repose at his family's palace. The funeral took place on 12 July, in the Mother Church of Our Lady of the Assumption of Atalaia, where he was buried in the side wall of the main chapel. Currently, his tomb is under the main altar.
