= João de Sousa =

Portuguese prelate

His Grace João de Sousa
- Archbishop of Lisbon
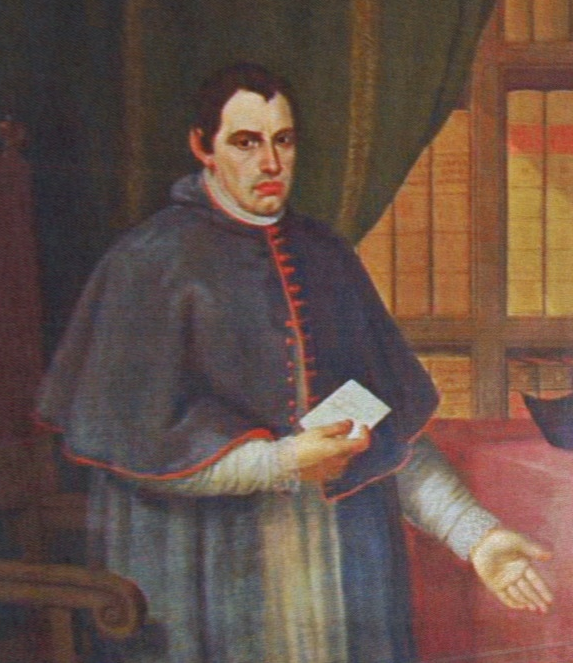
- Portrait by Vieira Lusitano, ca. 1750
- Church: Roman Catholic Church
- Archdiocese: Lisbon
- See: Cathedral of St. Mary Major
- Installed: 1 October 1703
- Term ended: 28 September 1710
- Predecessor: Luís de Sousa
- Successor: Tomás de Almeida
- Other post: Archbishop of Braga (1696–1703) Bishop of Porto (1683–96)

Personal details
- Born: 1647 Lisbon, Portugal
- Died: 28 September 1710 Lisbon, Portugal
- Education: University of Coimbra

D. João de Sousa (1647 - 28 September 1710) was a Portuguese prelate, Bishop of Porto, Archbishop of Braga and Archbishop of Lisbon.

== Biography ==
D. João was the son of Tomé de Sousa, 8th Lord of Gouveia with Francisca de Meneses, and nephew of Dom Diogo de Sousa, Archbishop of Évora.

He graduated in canons at the University of Coimbra, and afterwards entered the service of the Holy Office, he was a deputy in Évora, being already Archdeacon of Santa Cristina, in the Archbishopric of Braga, also holding the position of sumilher to Pedro II of Portugal. In 1682, he served in the Armada and went to Turin to aid the Duke of Savoy as his sumilher. On his return, at the time when Diogo de Sousa, his uncle, was Archbishop of Évora; he held the position of President of the Ecclesiastical Relation of that city. He was, afterwards deputy of the Inquisition of Lisbon, having refused the priory of Palmela and the Bishopric of Miranda. Nevertheless, he accepted the place of Bishop of Porto and had his elevation confirmed by Pope Innocent XI in 1684, being consecrated on April 16 by Cardinal D. Veríssimo de Lencastre, assisted by Bishop Manuel Pereira, Bishop-emeritus of St. Sebastião do Rio de Janeiro and by D. Antonio de Santa Maria, Titular Bishop of Diocaesarea in Isauria. He remained in the diocese until 1696, when he was elevated to Archbishop of Braga. His solemn entry took place on 29 June 1697. D. João remained in that post until 1703, when he was transferred to Lisbon. By his work and extreme humility, he received praises in the Apostolic Brief of Pope Innocent XII.

Kings Pedro II and João V made efforts to elevate the archbishop to cardinal, but when he was to be appointed by Pope Clement XI, he died on 29 September 1710. He is buried in the cemetery of the poor in the old cathedral, without epitaph and in humble burial, as he had wanted.

== Bibliography ==
- João Baptista de Castro (1870). Mappa de Portugal antigo e moderno (in Portuguese). Vol. 3. Lisboa: Typographia do Panorama. p. 90.
- Innocencio Francisco da Silva (1860). Diccionario bibliographico portuguez (in Portuguese). Vol. 4. Lisboa: Imprensa Nacional. p. 41.
