= Tomás de Almeida =

Portuguese bishop

His Eminence Tomás de Almeida CavC
- Cardinal, Patriarch of Lisbon
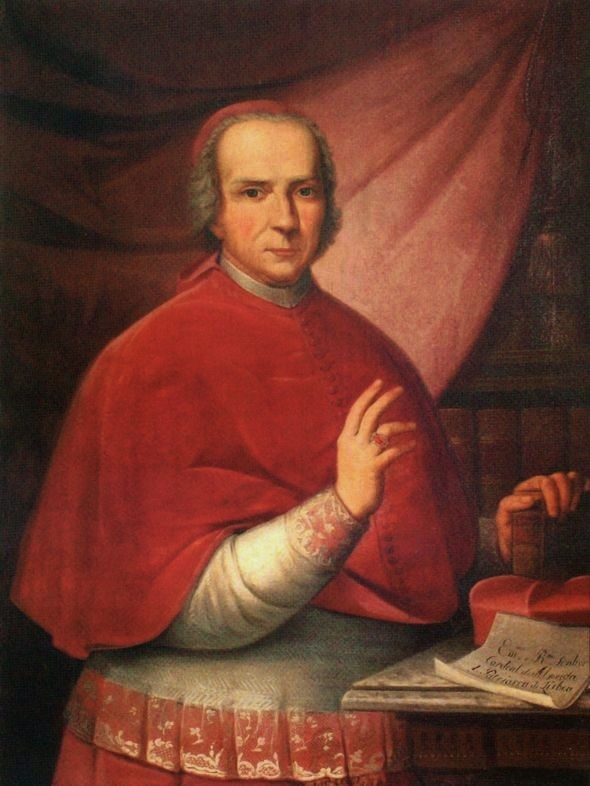
- Church: Roman Catholic Church
- Archdiocese: Lisbon
- See: Cathedral of St. Mary Major
- Installed: 7 December 1716
- Term ended: 27 February 1754
- Predecessor: João IV de Sousa as Archbishop of Lisbon
- Successor: José I Manuel da Câmara
- Other posts: Bishop of Lamego (1706–09); Bishop of Porto (1709–16)

Orders
- Ordination: 12 June 1695
- Consecration: 3 April 1707
- Created cardinal: 20 December 1737 by Clement XII

Personal details
- Born: 11 September 1670 Lisbon, Portugal
- Died: 27 February 1754 (aged 83) Lisbon, Portugal
- Education: Real Colégio de São Paulo, Coimbra; Colégio de Santo Antão

Styles of Tomás de Almeida
- Reference style: His Eminence
- Spoken style: Your Eminence
- Informal style: Cardinal
- See: Lisbon

Tomás de Almeida (Lisbon, 11 September 1670 - Lisbon, 27 February 1754) was the first Patriarch of Lisbon, formerly Bishop of Lamego and later of Porto. Pope Clement XII elevated him to the cardinalate on 20 December 1737.

== Biography ==
=== Early life ===
He was born in Lisbon in 1670 to António de Almeida-Portugal, 2nd Count of Avintes and Governor of the Algarves, and his wife Maria Antonia de Bourbon; his older brother was the 3rd Count of Avintes. He studied Latin, philosophy and rhetoric in the Jesuit Colégio de Santo Antão, in Lisbon. At the age of 18, on 20 December 1688, he took a scholarship to attend the Real Colégio de São Paulo of the University of Coimbra, where he graduated.

In 1695, he was a deputy of the Inquisition of Lisbon, and on 27 August 1695 was dispatched to preside over the Court of Appeals in Porto. On 1 June 1702, he took office as prosecutor and deputy of the Queen's Council of the Treasury, as well as prior of the church of São Lourenço de Lisboa. On 13 April 1703, he was appointed deputy of the Bureau of Conscience and Orders, having already been decorated as a knight of the Order of Christ.

On 28 May 1704, as King Pedro II departed for Beira, leaving his brother as regent, he was chosen to substitute Diogo de Mendonça Corte-Real (who accompanied the king) at the Secretary of Mercies, Expedient and Signature.

=== Episcopate ===
Tomás de Almeida was made the King's chaplain of honour (sumilher da cortina), Governor of the Royal Treasury, Chancellor of the Kingdom, taking office on 24 November 1704. The papal bull of Clement XI made him Bishop of Lamego, sacred in Lisbon in the church of the Convent of Grace on 3 April 1707, chief chaplain and titular Bishop of Torga Dom Frei Nuno da Cunha e Ataíde. He entered the diocese on 2 May. As there was disagreement between the cabinet and the Bishop of Viseu, he was able to ease tensions and was made by the King, already sick and whom he had seen in his last hours, Notary Public of the Kingdom.

On 1 July 1707, the day of the Royal Acclamation, King João V appointed him to be Registrar of the Pureness.

On 3 May 1708, he travelled to Coimbra on a commission at the Real Colégio de São Paulo. José de Santa Maria Saldanha was appointed Bishop of Porto by decree of 30 April and royal charter of 26 May 1709, and on the same date Governor of Arms of the same city.

On 7 November 1716, Pope Clement, delivering his services to the College of Cardinals in consistory, elevated the Royal Collegiate Chapel of São Tomé to a metropolitan cathedral with the title "Holy Patriarcal Cathedral".

He was named Chief Chaplain-Patriarch in the royal charter of 4 December 1713, confirmed on 7 December by the Holy See, making him the first Patriarch of Lisbon.

On 13 February 1717, Tomás entered Lisbon in majestic solemnity attended by the secular and regular clergy, state officials, a court procession, and troops formed in wings. Father Francisco de Santa Maria recorded the events as follows:

"His entry started in the church of San Sebastião da Pedreira, the noblemen of the court waiting for him on horseback. He took to the carriage and came marching with light accompaniment to the church of Santa Marta; then went down on horseback to the gates of Santo Antão, where the altar was erected. He left dressed pontifically with his cloak and white miter, and mounted a mule, covered with a white linen cloth, the reins given to Brother D. Luis, Count of Avintes. When the councillors of the two chambers of Lisbon and the two wings that formed the regular communities, confraternities and brotherhoods of the city received him under a canopy of precious canvas, they arrived at the Holy Patriarchal Cathedral, this act to the hymn Te Deum laudamus, sung with solemnity."

On 17 November 1717, he had the honor to bless the first stone, medal and foundations of the Royal Basilica of Mafra.

He baptized the Infantes D. Pedro and D. Alexandre, and the four children of the Prince of Brazil.

On 11 January 1728, he celebrated in the Holy Patriarchal Cathedral the marriage of the Infanta Dona Maria Bárbara to the Prince of Asturias, and on 20 January 1729, in Elvas, that of the Prince of Brazil with the Princess Dona Mariana Vitória.

On that same year, he hired the famous Italian architect Antonio Canevari to build his summer residence and an aqueduct in Santo Antão do Tojal, in Lisbon countryside.

=== Cardinalate ===
On 20 December 1737, he ascended to the cardinalate. He received the red hat in the Oratory of the palace where he lived near the church of São Roque. He came to Lisbon to receive, on 3 March 1738, Julio Sacchetti, envoy of the Holy See, Canon of St. Peter in the Vatican and the Pope's chief chamberlain. On 13 November 1746, the Holy Patriarchal Cathedral which the King had built after the extinction of the Eastern diocese by Benedict XIV, was destroyed by an earthquake.

On 7 September 1750, he attended the acclamation of Joseph I of Portugal. On 27 October 1753, he offered the Brotherhood of Santa Isabel part of his expensive silver flatware for their assistance in the reconstruction of the cathedral, upon his death he bequeathed the rest to them, then worth more than four reals.

He spent large sums of money on the construction of convents, churches, and other religious bodies. He remained controversial with Alexandre de Gusmão and Diogo de Mendonça Corte-Real.

His body is interred in Igreja de São Roque, in Lisbon.

== Bibliography ==
- BARBOSA ( D. José ) - PANAGYRICO / AO EXCELLENTISS. E REVERENDISS. SENHOR D. THOMAZ DE ALMEIDA, Principal of the Holy Western Church, of the Council of His Majesty. /, & c. / COMPOSED BY / ... / Regular Clergyman / Examiner of the Three Military Orders, and Synodal of the Patriarchate, Chronist of the Serene House of Bragança, and Royal Academician of the number of Portuguese History. WESTERN LISBON, At the Offices of ANTONIO ISIDORO DA FONSECA, Printer of Duque Estribeiro mòr. Year of 1739. The author was born in Lisbon on November 23, 1674, and died in the same city on April 6, 1750. Cleric Regular Teatino was a chronicler of the House of Braganza. The work tries to highlight the virtues and abilities of D. Tomás de Almeida, chosen by D. João V to be the first Cardinal-Patriarch of Lisbon.
