= Principal =

Principal may refer to:

== Title or rank ==
- Principal (academia), the chief executive of a university
  - Principal (education), the head of a school
- Principal (civil service) or principal officer, the senior management level in the UK Civil Service
- Principal dancer, the top rank in ballet
- Principal (music), the top rank in an orchestra

=== Law ===
- Principal (commercial law), the person who authorizes an agent
  - Principal (architecture), licensed professional(s) with ownership of the firm
- Principal (criminal law), the primary actor in a criminal offense
- Principal (Catholic Church), an honorific used in the See of Lisbon

== Places ==
- Principal, Cape Verde, a village
- Principal, Ecuador, a parish

== Media ==
- The Principal (TV series), a 2015 Australian drama series
- The Principal, a 1987 action film
- Principal (music), the lead musician in a section of an orchestra
- Principal photography, the first phase of movie production
- "Principal", a song by Cardi B featuring Janet Jackson from the album Am I the Drama?
- "The Principal", a song by Melanie Martinez from the album K-12
- The Principal (Vice Principals), an episode of the American TV series Vice Principals

== Finance ==
- Principal (finance) or principal sum, the original amount of a debt or investment on which interest is calculated
  - Principal (bond), the face value of a bond
- Principal Financial Group, a life insurance company

== Other uses ==
- Principal (computer security), an entity that can be identified and verified
- Principal or diapason, one of the flue pipes on a pipe organ
  - Principal or diapason, a corresponding organ stop on a pipe organ
- Victoria Principal (born 1950), American actress

== See also ==
- Principle (disambiguation), easily confused word
