= Salvatoris nostri Mater =

1740 papal bull regarding Lisbon

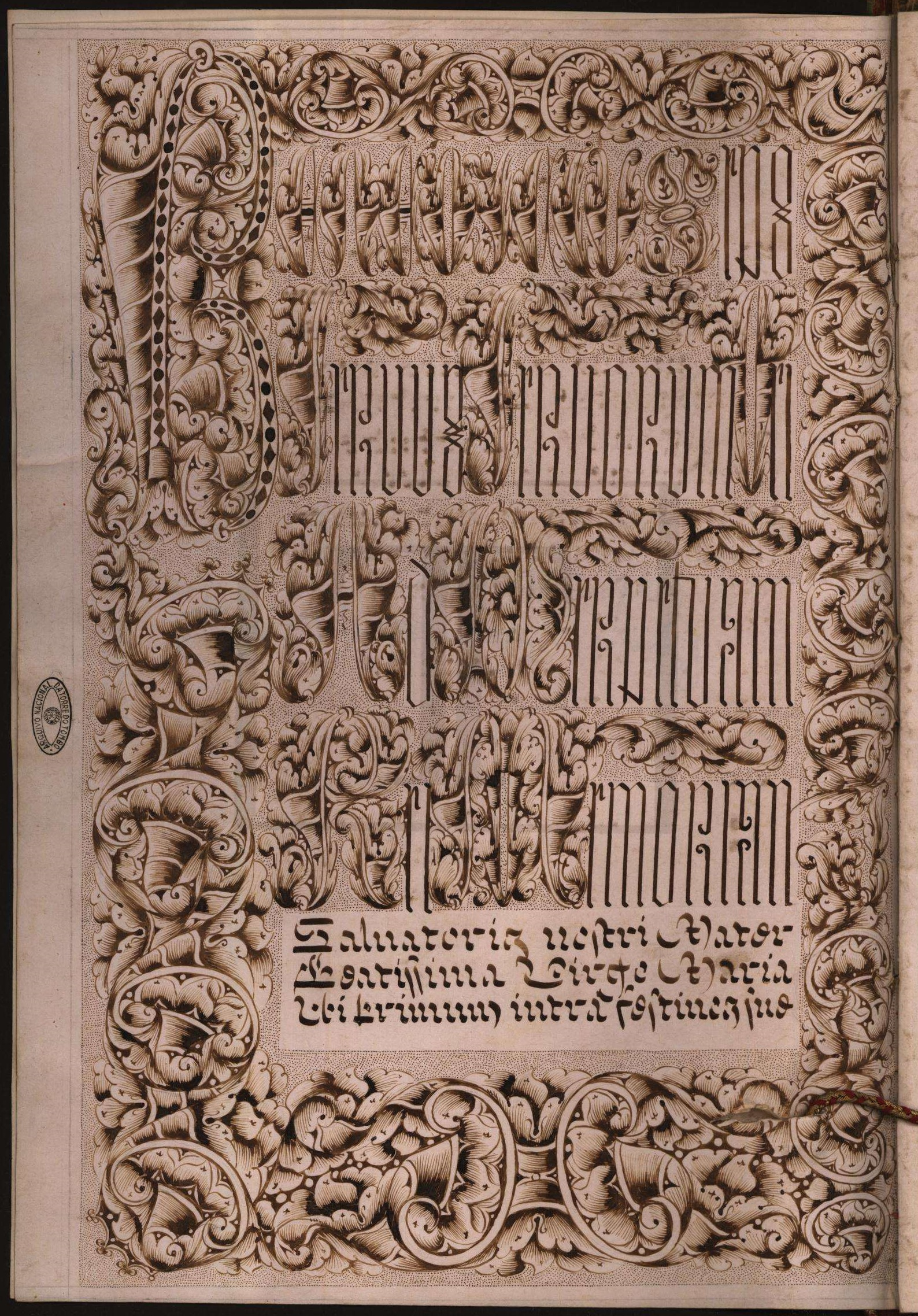
Title page of Salvatoris nostri Mater, 1740 (Portuguese National Archive)

Salvatoris nostri Mater was a papal bull issued by Pope Benedict XIV on 13 December 1740, ending the ecclesiastical division of the city of Lisbon by suppressing the vacant Metropolitan Archdiocese of Eastern Lisbon and incorporating the whole territory into the Patriarchate of Western Lisbon. The civil division of the city was eventually abolished by King John V, on 31 August 1741.

This bull also granted the canons of the patriarchal chapter the honorific title of Principal.
