= José Maria da Fonseca e Évora =

His Most Reverend Lordship Frei José Maria da Fonseca Évora O.F.M. Obs.
- Bishop of Porto
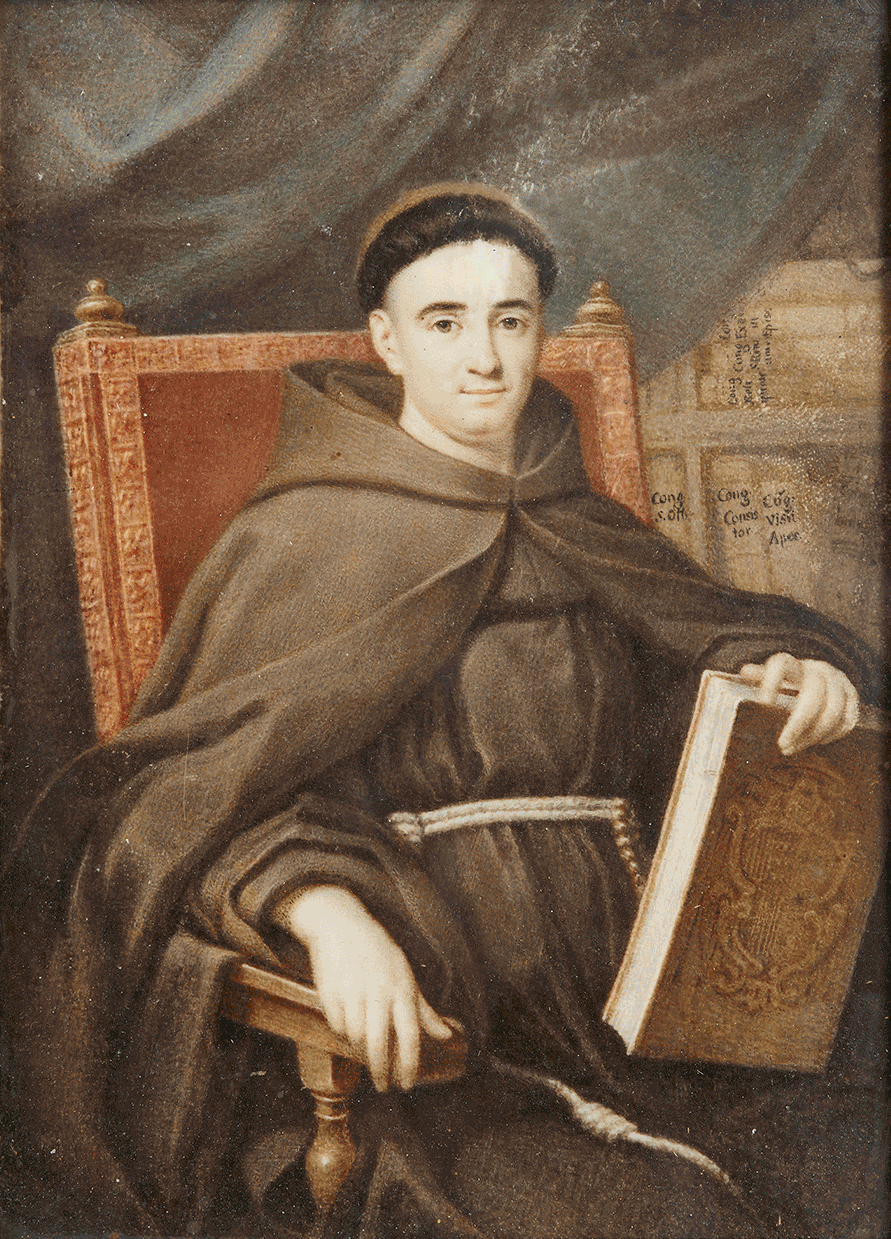
- Portrait, c. 1730, National Museum of Ancient Art, Lisbon, Portugal
- Diocese: Porto
- Appointed: 2 January 1741
- Predecessor: Tomás de Almeida
- Successor: Frei António de Távora

Orders
- Ordination: December 1715
- Consecration: 12 March 1741 by Tomás de Almeida

Personal details
- Born: José Ribeiro da Fonseca Figueiredo e Sousa; 3 December 1690 Évora, Portugal
- Died: 16 June 1752 (aged 61) Porto, Portugal
- Buried: Porto Cathedral
- Denomination: Roman Catholic

Styles of Frei José Maria da Fonseca e Évora
- Reference style: His Most Reverend Lordship
- Spoken style: Your Most Reverend Lordship
- Religious style: Frei José Maria

José Ribeiro da Fonseca Figueiredo e Sousa (3 December 1690 – 16 June 1752), also known by his religious name José Maria da Fonseca e Évora, was a Portuguese Franciscan who served as an accomplished diplomat of King John V in Rome and, later, Bishop of Porto.

== Life ==
José Ribeiro da Fonseca Figueiredo e Sousa was born on 3 December 1690, in the city of Évora, the son of Manuel Ribeiro da Fonseca Figueiredo (who had served the Habsburgs as a cavalry officer in Milan and Flanders), and his wife, Ana Maria Barroso da Gama Michão. He had a sister, named Mariana Ribeiro da Fonseca Figueiredo. He first earned a Artium Magister degree from the University of Évora and, from 1710, studied Canon law at the University of Coimbra.

José Ribeiro da Fonseca Figueiredo e Sousa left for Rome in 1712, as part of the extraordinary embassy of the Marquis of Fontes. The reason for his sudden departure from the country is obscure, but it was apparently due to his having incurred in King John V's wrath after standing accused of having forged genealogical documents to attain the status of fidalgo — fleeing persecution, he sought refuge and took his first vows at the Franciscan Monastery of Varatojo, but was soon after ordered to leave due to the Franciscans' fear of retaliation.

Once in Italy, he made solemn vows at the Convent of San Bernardino di Orte and made his religious profession and was received into the Franciscan Order in the Convent of Santa Maria in Ara Coeli in Rome, 8 December 1712, taking the name José Maria da Fonseca e Évora. In 1727, Pope Benedict XIII named Fonseca e Évora Procurator General of the Franciscan Order, and, in 1732, is granted the honorific title of Minister General. As Minister General, he was untiring in his efforts to restore discipline; and displayed prudence, tact, and executive ability. In 1740 he founded the large library in the old convent of Ara Coeli (the Biblioteca Eborense), and under his direction and patronage, the Annales Minorum of Luke Wadding were published in Rome in seventeen volumes, between the years 1731 and 1741.

From 1728, Fonseca e Évora assumed the duties of King John V's chargé d'affaires. Two years later he is made ambassador: in 1731, he is appointed resident minister and on 1 August 1733, minister plenipotentiary. Fonseca e Évora was instrumental in the normalisation of diplomatic relations between Portugal and the Holy See following the Pope's refusal to elevate Vincenzo Bichi, Apostolic Nuncio to Portugal, to the cardinalate.

Fonseca several times declined the episcopal dignity (namely the bishoprics of Osimo, Tivoli, and Assisi), but finally accepted (1741) the See of Porto, to which he was nominated by John V of Portugal.

He died on 16 June 1752 in Porto, and was buried the following day underneath the main altar of Porto Cathedral. The Franciscans in Portugal held a solemn funeral Mass at the Convent of São Francisco da Cidade, in Lisbon, on 1 September, with a eulogy delivered by Francisco Xavier de Santa Teresa, which was published the following year. After his death, many of his possessions were scattered and auctioned off to pay his creditors.

== Notes ==
Attribution

Catholic Church titles
Preceded by Tomás de Almeida	Bishop of Porto; 1741–1752	Succeeded by Frei António de Távora
