= Potamius =

First recorded bishop of the city of Lisbon

- Bishop of Lisbon
- Church: Roman Catholic
- See: Diocese of Lisbon
- In office: 355-357 (?)
- Predecessor: Januário
- Successor: António

Personal details
- Born: Portugal (?)
- Died: 360-384

Potamius (Greek: Ποτάμιος, fl. 343–360 AD), also known as Potamius of Lisbon, was the first recorded bishop of the city of Lisbon. He was possibly born in Lisbon, given that Iberian communities at the time usually chose their own citizens as bishops. He was part of the Council of Sirmium in 357, in which he defended Arianism. He is the second earliest Christian prose writer of the Iberian Peninsula, with Hosius of Corduba being the first.

== Context ==
The historical evidence on Christian presence in the Iberian Peninsula is scarce and lacking in detail. The Synod of Elvira attests Christian presence in Iberia somewhere between 295 and 314 and allows scholars to estimate the existence of 41 Christian communities in Iberian by the time, with Hispania Baetica and Carthaginiensis as the most Christianized provinces.

Rodrigo da Cunha placed the first Christian communities in Lisbon between 36 and 106 AD and considered Potamius to be the fifth bishop (Mantius of Évora being the first), but this view failed to meet scientific rigor. The Holy Martyrs of Lisbon (303 AD), during the Diocletianic Persecution, may attest Christian presence in the beginning of the 4th Century AD, although the first documents regarding the events of the Holy Martyrs date only to the 9th Century. The Synod of Elvira mentions the presence of three Lusitanian dioceses: Ebora, Ossonoba, and Mérida.

In 318 or 319, Arius had founded Arianism, denying Trinitarianism by positing that Jesus' existence was not eternal and that his substance was not equal to that of God. In 325, the Roman Emperor Constantine convened the First Council of Nicaea, led by Hosius of Corduba, in which Arianism was strongly rejected and Arius exiled by Constantine. Later, Arianism managed to regain some importance in the Roman Empire, mostly be the actions of Eusebius of Nicomedia and his (successful) attempts to exile the Nicean Athanasius of Alexandria. After the death of Constantine, in 337, the Roman Empire is split into his three sons Constantine II, Constans, and Constantius II, of which the latter was the most favorable to Arianism. Constantine II dies in 340 and Constans in 350, leaving the Roman Empire to Constantius II from 353 onwards.

== Arianism ==
Not much can be stated about Potamius before 355. At that date, it is known that Potamius was bishop of Lisbon and converted from Catholicism to Arianism. Scholars agree that Potamius was not present in the Council of Sirmium in 351, when the followers of Eusebius of Nicomedia issued a moderate Arianism profession, known as the First Formula of Sirmium. It is unknown whether he was present in the Council of Arles in 353 and the Council of Milan in 355. In 357, Potamius, along with Eusebius, condemned Pope Liberius' moderate position, wanting him to express an unambiguous pro-Arian position.

In 357, Potemius participates in the Council of Sirmium. This council comes about at a time when there were two trends within Arianism, the homoiousian (which states that Jesus is of a similar substance as that of God) and the anomoean trend (which states that Jesus is neither of the same or similar substance as God). The Council of Sirmium in 357 strongly favored the anomoean trend, in line with the opinions of Ursacius, Valens, and Potemius. In fact, Potemius is reported to have played an important role in furthering Arianism in the 357 Council and in developing the pro-anomoean Second Formula of Sirmium that resulted from it. It is unknown whether Potamius was part of the Council of Ariminum (359), but his Epistula ad Athanasium is recorded as having been written after the council, in 360, and it contains a surprisingly strong anti-Arian message, only 5 years after his conversion to Arianism.

A book published in 383 or 384 (Libellus precum ad Imperatores) by Luciferians states that Potamius received a villa from Constantius II as a reward for his adoption of Arianism but then died as he made his way to it. This account is not considered historically valid, but, along with the date of the Ad Athanasium, is used to construct a range of possible dates for Potamius' death, which is in this approach placed between 360 and 384.

Many views exist about Potamius' Arianism:

- Some scholars, André Wilmart among them, posit that Potamius was first Catholic, and then, around 357, converted to Arianism. In this view, the date of Ad Athanasium has to be previous to 360.
- Others, among them Enrique Flórez, posit that Potamius was not Arian and was accused of converting to Arianism because he was merely present at the Council of Sirmium in 357.
- A moderate approach posits that Potamius did have an Arian phase, but reconverted to Catholicism around 360.
- Still others suggest Potamius only converted to arianism to avoid exile, which had happened to Hilary of Poitiers, Athanasius of Alexandria, and Pope Liberius.

== Works ==
The following are works by Potamius which have survived (all of a Catholic approach):

- De Lazaro
- De Martyrio Isaiae Prophetae
- Epistula ad Athanasium
- Epistula de Substantia Patris et Filii et Spiritus Sancti

These works were wrongly attributed to other writers. De Lazaro was attributed to John Chrysostom, as well as to Zeno of Verona (De Isaiae was also attributed to Zeno). The two Epistulae were attributed to Jerome. Luc d'Achery, in 1657, was the first scholar to identify Potamius' catholic writings when he attributed the Epistula ad Athanasium to Potamius. Girolamo and Pietro Ballerini, in 1739, noticed the similarities between De Lazaro and De Isaiae with Epistula ad Athanasium, but attributed them to a second Potamius that was not the bishop of Lisbon. Circa 1769, Andrea Gallandi finally attributed the two works to Potamius of Lisbon. The Epistula de Substantia would only be identified in 1912, by André Wilmart.

The only surviving Arian writing of Potamius is a citation from Phoebadius of Agen's Contra Arianos.

== See also ==
- Arian controversy
- Romanization of Hispania
- History of Lisbon

Catholic Church titles
Preceded by Januário	Bishop of Lisbon; 355-357 (?)	Succeeded by António
