= António de Mendonça =

Portuguese bishop

His Grace António de Mendonça
- Archbishop of Lisbon
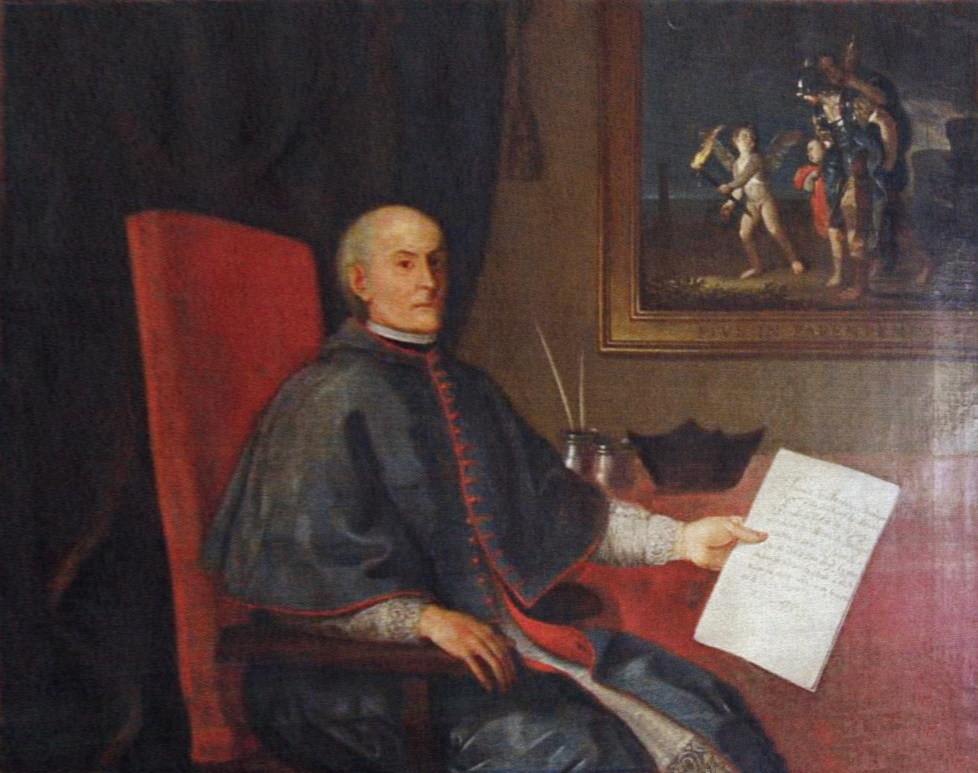
- Portrait by Vieira Lusitano
- Church: Roman Catholic Church
- Archdiocese: Lisbon
- See: Cathedral of St. Mary Major
- Installed: 15 December 1670
- Term ended: 16 February 1675
- Predecessor: Rodrigo da Cunha
- Successor: Luís de Sousa

Personal details
- Born: 1600 Lamego, Portugal
- Died: 13 February 1675 (aged 74–75) Lisbon, Portugal

D. António de Mendonça (1600 – 13 February 1675) was Archbishop of Lisbon between 1670 and his death. He was the son of Nuno de Mendonça, 1st Count of Vale de Reis and was one of the main exponents in the fight against the excesses practiced by the Portuguese Inquisition.
