= Luís de Sousa =

Luís de Sousa may refer to:

- Luís de Sousa (cardinal) (1630–1702), Portuguese cardinal
- Luís de Sousa (writer) (1555–1632), Portuguese writer
