= Álvaro (bishop) =

- Bishop of Lisbon
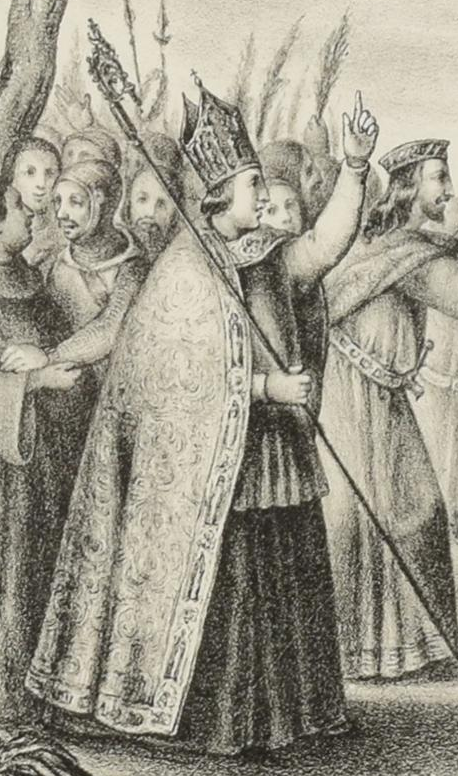
- Church: Roman Catholic
- See: Diocese of Lisbon
- In office: 1166-1185
- Predecessor: Gilbert of Hastings
- Successor: Soeiro Anes

Personal details
- Died: 11 September 1185; Lisbon, Kingdom of Portugal

Álvaro (died 11 September 1185 in Lisbon, Kingdom of Portugal) was the second Bishop of Lisbon from 1166 until his death. He is buried in St. James' Chapel in Lisbon Cathedral.

== See also ==
- Catholic Church in Portugal

Catholic Church titles
Preceded by Gilbert of Hastings	Bishop of Lisbon; 1166-1185	Succeeded by Soeiro Anes
