= Patriarchate of Lisbon =

Roman Catholic archdiocese in Portugal

Coordinates: 38°42′53″N 9°7′39″W

Metropolitan Patriarchate of Lisbon Patriarchatus Metropolitæ Olisiponensis Patriarcado Metropolitano de Lisboa

Catholic
- Lisbon Cathedral

- Seal

Location
- Country: Portugal
- Ecclesiastical province: Lisbon

Statistics
- Area: 3,735 km^{2} (1,442 sq mi)
- Population: Total; Catholics: (as of 2022); 1,617,390; 1,462,050 (90.4%)
- Parishes: 285

Information
- Denomination: Catholic
- Rite: Roman Rite
- Established: 4th century
- Cathedral: Lisbon Cathedral
- Patron saint: Vincent of Saragossa
- Secular priests: 281 (Diocesan); 250 (Religious Orders); 95 Permanent Deacons

Current leadership
- Pope: Leo XIV
- Patriarch: Rui I
- Suffragans: Angra; Funchal; Guarda; Leiria-Fátima; Portalegre-Castelo Branco; Santarém; Setúbal
- Auxiliary Bishops: Joaquim Augusto da Silva Mendes; Alexandre Coutinho Lopes de Brito Palma; Nuno Isidro Nunes Cordeiro
- Bishops emeritus: Manuel III

Map
- The Archdiocese of Lisbon shown in a darker red.

Website
- patriarcado-lisboa.pt

The Metropolitan Patriarchate of Lisbon (Latin: Patriarchatus Metropolitæ Olisiponensis) is a Latin Church ecclesiastical territory or patriarchal archdiocese of the Catholic Church in Lisbon, the capital of Portugal.

Its archiepiscopal see is the Patriarchal Cathedral of St. Mary Major, in Lisbon. The patriarchate also has three minor basilicas: the Basilica of Our Lady of the Martyrs and Basilica of the Most Sacred Heart of Jesus in Estrela, both in Lisbon; the Basilica of Our Lady and St. Anthony in Mafra; and two World Heritage Site monasteries: the Monastery of the Hieronymites, in Lisbon, and the Monastery of Saint Mary of Alcobaça, in Alcobaça.

== Patriarchate today ==
The patriarchate pastorally served, as per 2014, 1,648,885 Catholics (86% of 1,924,650 total) on 3,735 km^{2} in 285 parishes and 604 missions, with 543 priests (291 diocesan, 252 religious), 84 deacons, 1,505 lay religious (401 brothers, 1,104 sisters) and 54 seminarians.

== History ==
The diocese of Lisbon was created in the 4th century, but it lay vacant after 716 when the city was captured by the Moors, notwithstanding that there are references to Mozarabic bishops of the Mozarabic Rite in that period. The diocese was restored during the Second Crusade in 1147 when the city was captured by King Afonso I of Portugal after the siege of Lisbon. A crusader's account of that event refers to the local "elderly Bishop of the city" being slain "against all right and justice", by marauding Flemish and German crusaders, in direct defiance of the terms of the city's rendition.

As Portugal grew in political importance and colonial possessions the jurisdiction of the Metropolitan of Lisbon expanded; Stadel says in his Compendium geographiae ecclesiasticae universalis (1712) that Coimbra, Leiria, Portalegre, Elvas, Funchal, Angra, Congo, St. James of Cape Verde, São Tomé, and Baia of All Saints were suffragans of Lisbon. As a reward for its assistance against the Turks, Pope Clement XI in 1708 raised the Chapel of the Royal Palace to Collegiate rank and associated with it three parishes in the dioceses of Bragança and Lamego. Later, yielding to the request of King John V, he issued the Bull In Supremo Apostolatus Solio (22 October 1716) – known as the Golden Bull because the seal or bulla was affixed with gold instead of lead – giving the collegiate chapel cathedral rank, with metropolitical rights, and conferring on its titular the rank of patriarch.

The city of Lisbon was ecclesiastically divided into Eastern and Western Lisbon. The former archbishop of Lisbon retained jurisdiction over Eastern Lisbon, and had as suffragan dioceses those of Guarda, Portalegre, St. James of Cape Verde, São Tomé, and São Salvador in Congo. Western Lisbon and metropolitan rights over Leiria, Lamego, Funchal and Angra, together with elaborate privileges and honours, were granted to the new patriarch and his successors. It was further agreed between pope and king that the patriarch of Lisbon should be made a cardinal at the first consistory following his appointment (Inter praecipuas apostolici ministerii, 1737).

The first patriarch of Lisbon was Tomás de Almeida (1670–1754), formerly bishop of Porto; he was raised to the cardinalate on 20 December 1737 by Pope Clement XII. There thus existed side by side in the city of Lisbon two metropolitical churches. To obviate the inconvenience of this arrangement Pope Benedict XIV (13 December 1740) united East and West Lisbon into one single archdiocese under Patriarch Almeida, who ruled the see until his death in 1754. The double chapter however remained until 1843, when the old cathedral chapter was dissolved by Pope Gregory XVI. It was during the patriarchate of Cardinal Almeida (1746) that the famous Chapel of Saint John the Baptist was built in Rome (1742–1747) at the expense of King John V and consecrated by Pope Benedict XIV, and then transported to and reconstructed in the Church of St. Roch in Lisbon. Patriarch Almeida is buried in the chancel of that church.

At what date the patriarchs of Lisbon began to quarter the tiara with three crowns, though without the keys, on their coat of arms is uncertain and there are no documents referring to the grant of such a privilege. By apostolic letters dated 30 September 1881 the metropolitan of Lisbon claims as suffragans the dioceses of Angola, St. James of Cape Verde, São Tomé, Egitan, Portalegre, Angra, and Funchal.

== Privileges of the patriarchate ==
Throughout history, many privileges have been granted to the patriarchate of Lisbon and its patriarch by the Holy See.

- Patriarch of Lisbon's right to cardinal dignity:
  - Appointment as Cardinal in the Consistory following the installation to the patriarchal see;
  - Right to wear cardinal garments even before he is created, such as cassock and scarlet coral robes, but unlike cardinals, the cap must have a tassel as is typical of bishops, all in scarlet; this privilege is shared with the patriarch of Venice and the archbishop of Salzburg;
  - Right to wear the scarlet tassel of 30 tassels on the coat of arms even before being created cardinal; this privilege is shared with the archbishop of Salzburg, although in his case with 12 tassels as is typical of the archbishops.
- Right to affix the papal Tiara to the patriarchate's and patriarch's coat of arms, an exclusive honour never granted to any other Catholic prelate; unlike the papal coat of arms instead of the keys of St. Peter, the patriarchal coat of arms has an archiepiscopal double cross and a decussed staff. Throughout history, the papal tiara has only been used on the coats of arms of two prelates, the pope and the patriarch of Lisbon. In liturgical acts, the patriarchs of Lisbon also wore the unique and precious miter-tiara, with three levels, in honour of the privilege granted.

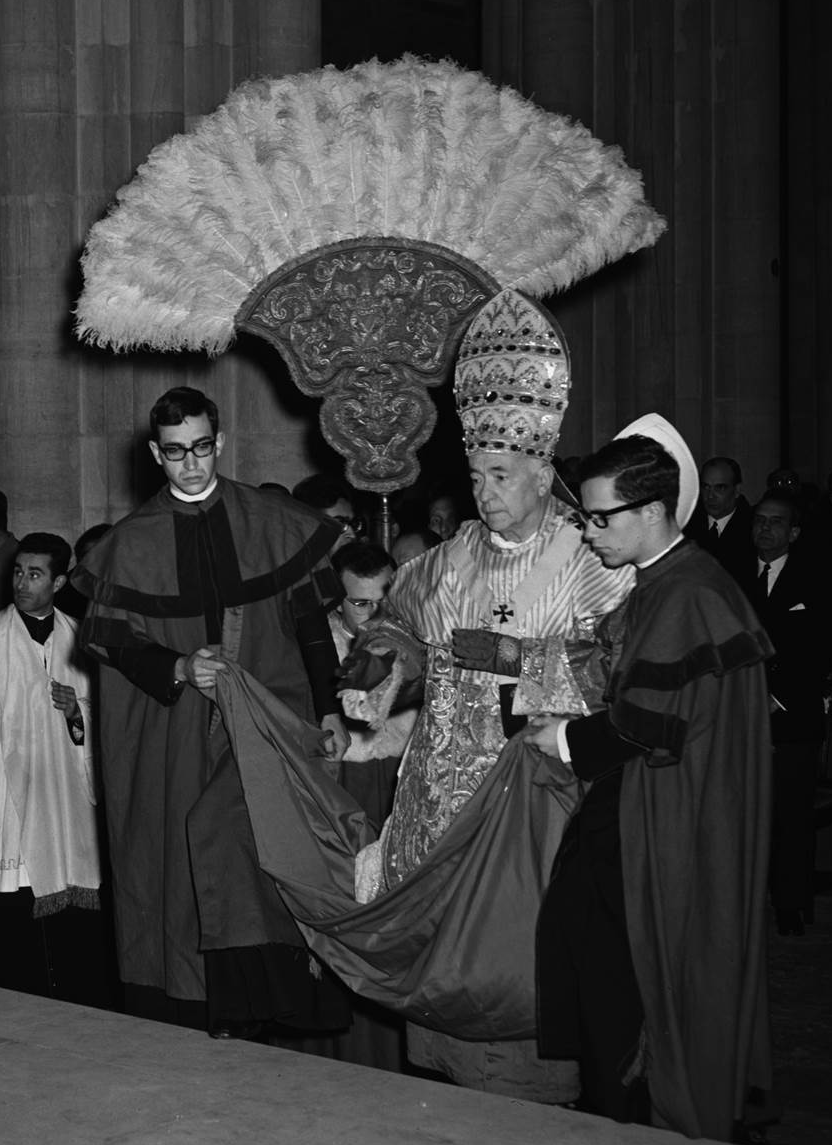
Cardinal-Patriarch Manuel Gonçalves Cerejeira using the pontifical fanon, falda, and flabella, as well as the three-tiered patriarchal mitre (reminiscent of the papal tiara), in 1965

- Concession of the use of some insignia and vestments exclusive to the Roman pontiff in Masses and pontifical processions chaired by the patriarch of Lisbon:
  - the right to use sedia gestatoria carried by 8 men, different from the pontifical sedia gestatoria carried by 12 men;
  - the right to use flabels, with the pope offering 2 of his 4 flabels;
  - right to use a pontifical falda;
  - right to use pontifical fanon;
- Right to anoint the kings of Portugal at the time of their acclamation, a privilege previously exercised by the archbishop primate of Braga.
- Right to have a Patriarchal Curia (similar but smaller than the Roman Curia).
- Right to have a Patriarchal Chapter divided into 3 orders in the likeness of the College of Cardinals, with the Canons of the 1st order having the right to use a miter, that is, being a Capido Mitrado.
- Right to a Guard of Honor similar to the extinct Pontifical Noble Guard.

These privileges were granted by Popes Clement XI, Innocent XIII, Benedict XIII and Clement XII. However, some have fallen into disuse over the centuries.

== Ordinaries ==
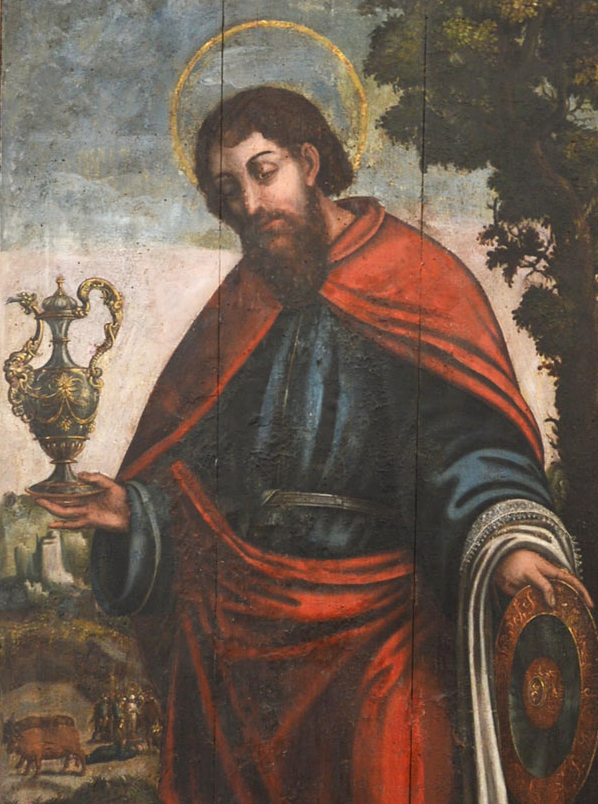
Mantius of Évora

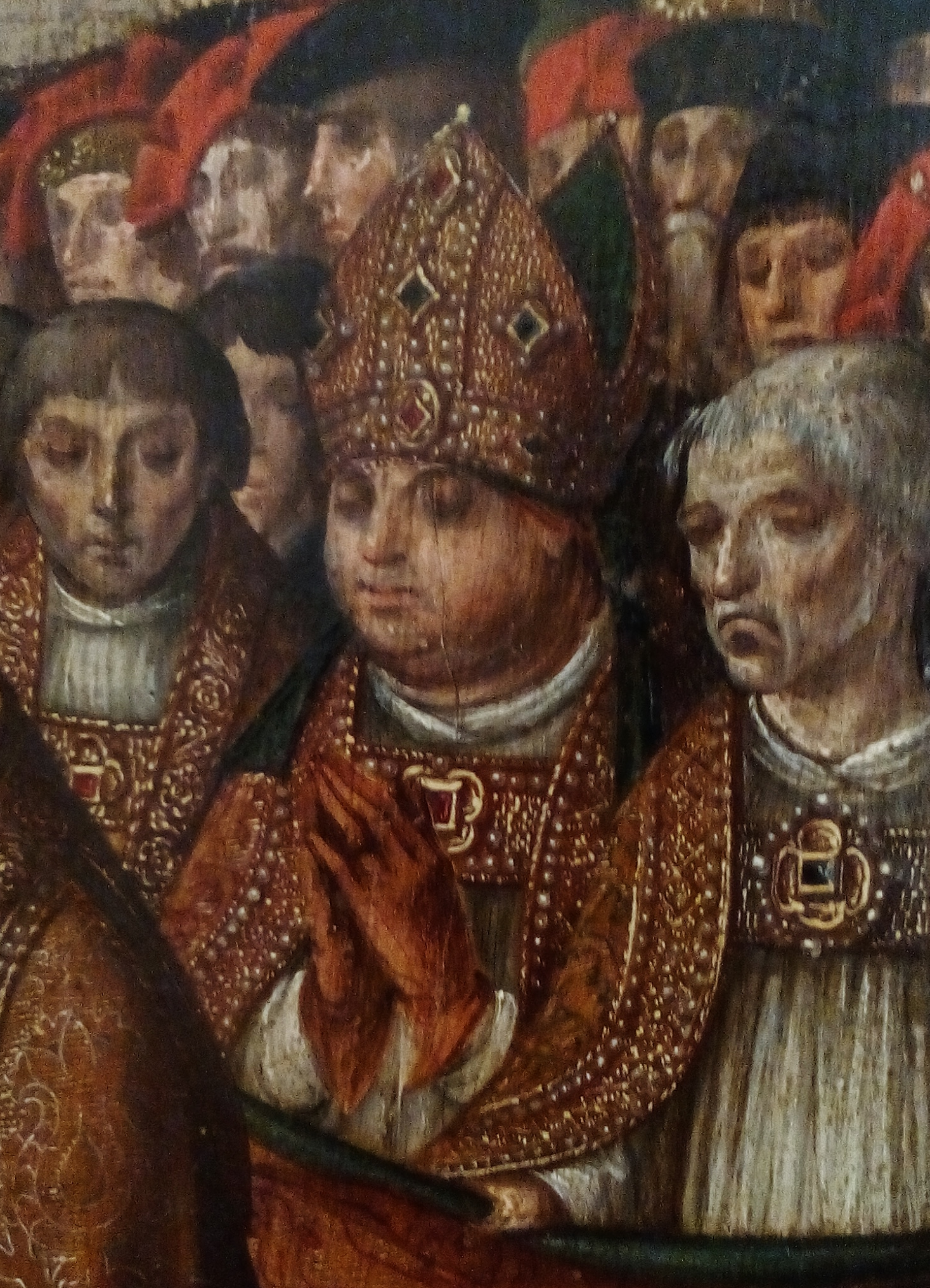
Archbishop Martinho da Costa

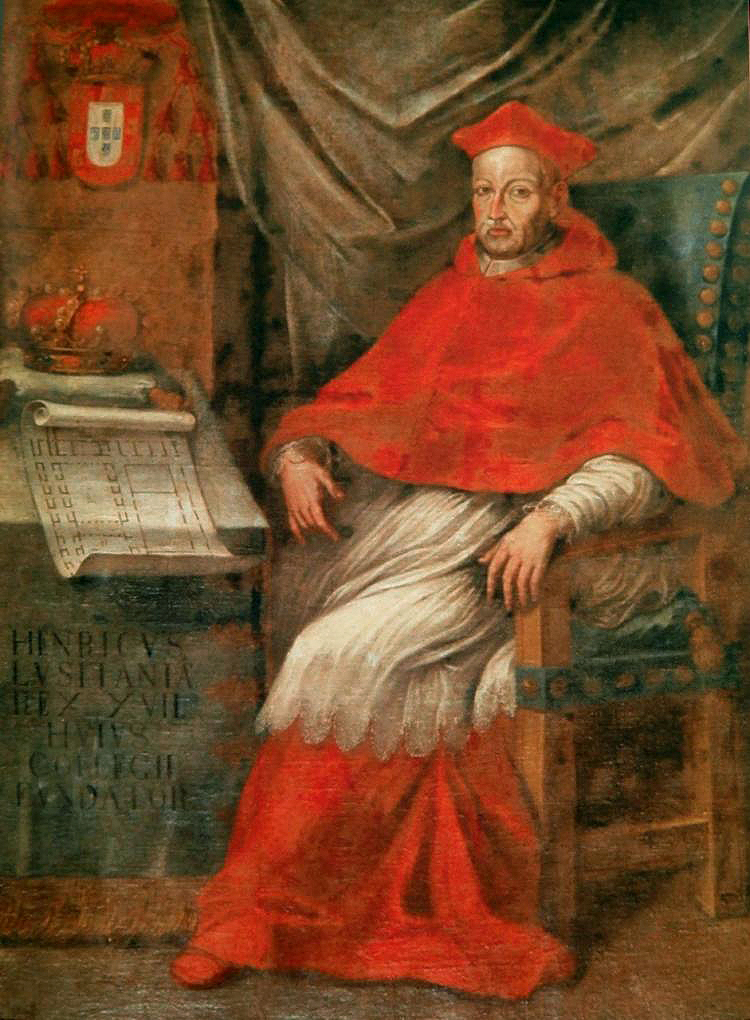
Henry I of Portugal was Archbishop Henry I of Lisbon before becoming King.

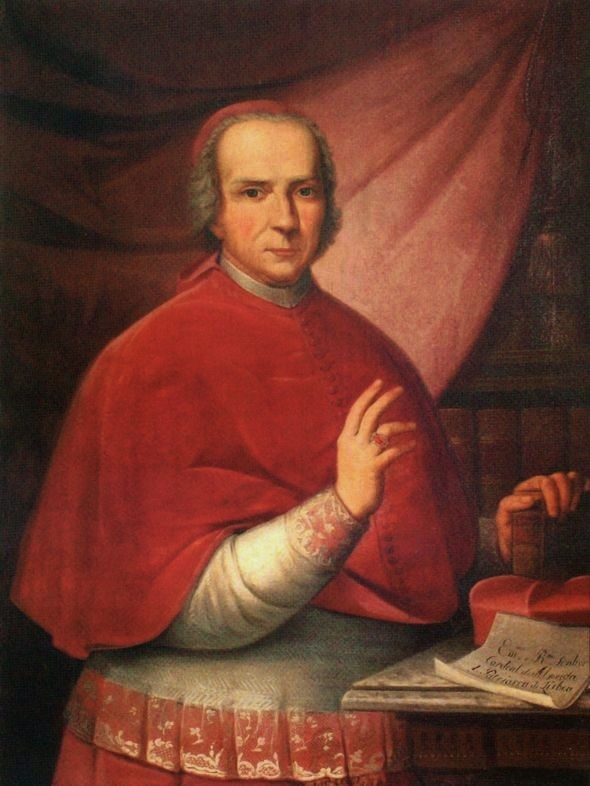
Patriarch Tomás I of Lisbon

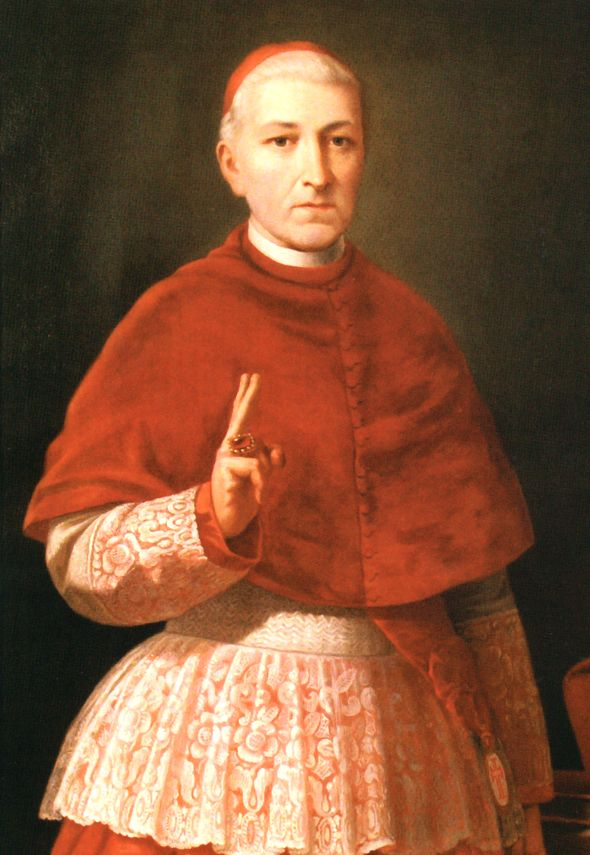
Patriarch Guilherme I of Lisbon

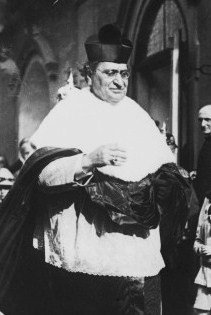
Patriarch José III of Lisbon

Lisbon, being one of the oldest cities in Iberia, has had a rich ecclesiastical history, in which the ordinaries of Lisbon have held different titles, partially depending on the country/city's rulers and their political/colonial power.

=== Suffragan bishops of Olisipo ===
1. Saint Mantius (36) legendary
2. Filipe Filoteu (92) legendary
3. Pedro (I) (166) legendary
4. Pedro (II) (213) legendary
5. Jorge (260) legendary
6. Pedro (III) (297) legendary
7. Saint Gens of Lisbon (?) legendary
8. Januário (300), legendary
9. São Potâmio (c. 356)
10. António (373)
11. Neobrídio (430)
12. Júlio (461)
13. Azulano (?)
14. João (500)
15. Éolo (536)
16. Nestoriano (578)
17. Paulo (589)
18. Goma or Gomarelo (610, 614)
19. Viarico, Ubalico or Dialico (633, 636, 638)
20. Nefrígio, Nefredo or Neofrídio (646)
21. Cesário or César (656)
22. Teodorico (666)
23. Ara (683)
24. Landerico (688, 693)
25. Ildefonso (?)

After the Muslim invasion of Lisbon in 716, the see was vacant. The diocese was revitalized with the Siege of Lisbon in 1147, when the city was once again in Christian hands.

=== Suffragan bishops of Lisbon ===
1. Gilbert of Hastings (1147-1166)
2. Álvaro (bishop) (1166-1185)
3. Soeiro (I) Anes (1185-1210)
4. Soeiro (II) Viegas (1210-1232)
5. Vicente (1232)
6. Paio Pais (1232-1233)
7. João (I) Falberto (1233)
8. Estêvão (I) Gomes (1234-1237)
9. João (II) (1239-1241)
10. Ricardo Guilherme (1241)
11. Aires Vasques (1241-1258)
12. Mateus (1259-1282)
13. Estêvão (II) Anes de Vasconcelos (1284-1289)
14. Domingos Anes Jardo (1289-1293)
15. João (III) Martins de Soalhães (1294-1312)
16. Frei Estêvão (III), O.F.M. (1312-1322)
17. Gonçalo Pereira (1322-1326)
18. João (IV) Afonso de Brito (1326-1341)
19. Vasco (I) Martins (1342-1344)
20. Estêvão (IV) de la Garde (1344-1348)
21. Teobaldo de Castillon (1348-1356)
22. Reginaldo de Maubernard (1356-1358)
23. Lourenço Rodrigues (1359-1364)
24. Pedro Gomes Barroso, o Jovem (1364-1369)
25. Fernando Álvares (1369-1371)
26. Vasco (II) Fernandes de Toledo (1371)
27. Agapito Colonna (1371-1380), 1378 Cardinal
28. João (V) de Agoult (1380-1381) - named bishop of Lisbon by pope Urban VI (pope in Rome)
29. Martinho de Zamora (1380-1383) - named bishop of Lisbon (and Cardinal in 1383) by Antipope Clement VII (pope in Avignon)
30. João (VI) Guterres (1381-1382) - named bishop of Lisbon by pope Urban VI (pope in Rome)
31. João (VII) Anes (c. 1383-1394)

=== Metropolitan archbishops of Lisbon ===
1. João (I) Anes (1394-1402)
2. Cardinal D. João (II) Afonso Esteves da Azambuja (1402-1415)
3. Diogo Álvares de Brito (1415-1422)
4. Pedro de Noronha (1424-1452)
5. Luís Coutinho (1452-1453)
6. Cardinal D. Jaime de Portugal (1453-1459)
7. Afonso (I) Nogueira (1459-1464)
8. Cardinal D. Jorge da Costa (1464-1500)
9. Martinho da Costa (1500-1521)
10. Cardinal-Infante D. Afonso (II) de Portugal (1523-1540)
11. Fernando de Meneses Coutinho e Vasconcelos (1540-1564)
12. Cardinal Infante D. Henrique de Portugal (1564-1570)
13. Jorge de Almeida (1570-1585)
14. Miguel de Castro (1586-1625)
15. Afonso (III) Furtado de Mendonça (1626-1630)
16. João (III) Manuel de Ataíde (1633)
17. Rodrigo da Cunha (1635-1643)
18. António de Mendonça (1670-1675)
19. Cardinal D. Luís de Sousa (1675-1702)
20. João (IV) de Sousa (1703-1710)

=== Latin patriarchs of Lisbon ===
1. Cardinal Tomás de Almeida (1716–1754)
2. Cardinal José (I) Manoel da Câmara (1754–1758)
3. Cardinal Francisco (I) de Saldanha da Gama (1758–1776)
4. Cardinal Fernando de Sousa da Silva (1779–1786)
5. Cardinal José (II) Francisco Miguel António de Mendonça (1786–1818)
6. Cardinal Carlos da Cunha e Menezes (1819–1825)
7. Cardinal Patrício da Silva (1826–1840)
8. Cardinal Francisco (II) de São Luís (Francisco Justiniano) Saraiva (1840–1845)
9. Cardinal Guilherme Henriques de Carvalho (1845–1857)
10. Cardinal Manuel (I) Bento Rodrigues da Silva (1858–1869)
11. Cardinal Inácio do Nascimento de Morais Cardoso (1871–1883)
12. Cardinal José (III) Sebastião de Almeida Neto (1883–1907)
13. Cardinal António (I) Mendes Belo (1907–1929)
14. Cardinal Manuel (II) Gonçalves Cerejeira (1929–1971)
15. Cardinal António (II) Ribeiro (1971–1998)
16. Cardinal José (IV) da Cruz Policarpo (1998–2013)
17. Cardinal Manuel (III) José Macário do Nascimento Clemente (2013–2023)
18. Rui (I) Manuel Sousa Valério (2023–present)

== Ecclesiastical province ==
The suffragan sees of the archdiocese are:

- Diocese of Angra (the Azores)
- Diocese of Funchal (on Madeira)
- Diocese of Guarda
- Diocese of Leiria-Fátima
- Diocese of Portalegre-Castelo Branco
- Diocese of Santarém
- Diocese of Setúbal.

== See also ==
- List of Catholic dioceses in Portugal

== Sources and external links ==
- GCatholic.org, with Google map – data for all sections
- Patriarch of Lisbon at catholic-hierarchy.org
- Official website (in Portuguese)
- Herbermann, Charles, ed. (1913). "Patriarchate of Lisbon" . Catholic Encyclopedia. New York: Robert Appleton Company.
- Westermann, Großer Atlas zur Weltgeschichte
