= Luís de Sousa (cardinal) =

Portuguese cardinal (1630–1702)

His Eminence Luís de Sousa
- Cardinal, Archbishop of Lisbon
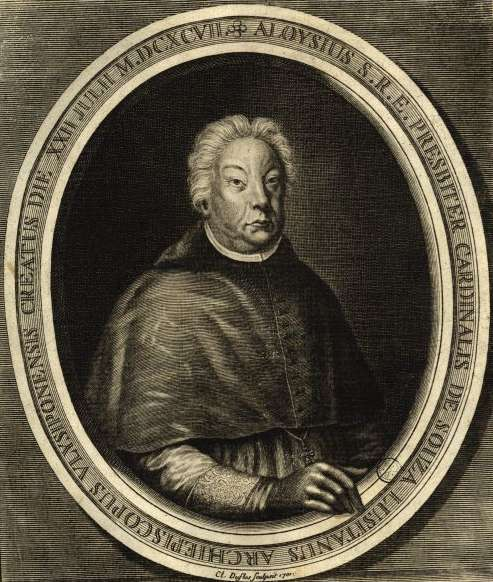
- Church: Roman Catholic Church
- Archdiocese: Lisbon
- See: Cathedral of St. Mary Major
- Installed: 2 December 1685
- Term ended: 3 January 1702
- Predecessor: António de Mendonça
- Successor: João de Sousa

Personal details
- Born: 6 October 1630 Porto, Portugal
- Died: 4 January 1701 (aged 70) Lisbon, Portugal
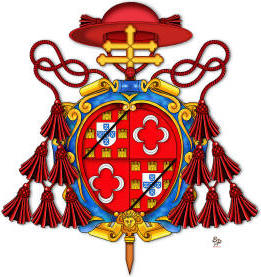
- Coat of arms

Luís de Sousa (6 October 1630 – 4 January 1701) was Archbishop of Lisbon. He was a major figure of the second half of the 17th century, serving as Royal Chaplain and Councillor of State of Portugal, later being created a Cardinal by Pope Innocent XII in 1697.

== Early life ==
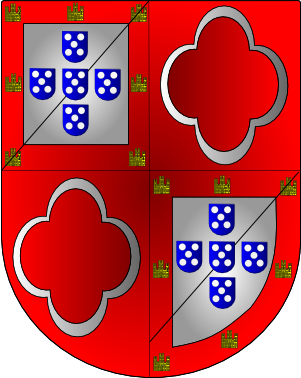
The Coat of Arms of Sousa's Family

Born into the Sousa family, and a descendant of Martim Afonso Chichorro, an illegitimate son of Afonso III, Luís was the fourth and last son of Diogo Lopes de Sousa (c. 1595–1640), 2nd Count of Miranda do Corvo, son Henrique Sousa Tavares and Mécia de Vilhena, and his wife Leonor de Mendonça (c. 1600–1656), the daughter of João Rodrigues de Sá, 1st Count of Penaguião and Isabel de Mendonça. The other siblings were Isabel (1624), Henrique, 1st Marquis of Arronches= and Mecia, who married Manuel Baltazar da Câmara, 1st Count of Ribeira Grande.

Luís was born in Porto on 6 October 1630, since is father was the Governor of the Relação e Casa do Porto, hereditary rank given to his family in 1582 by Philip II of Spain, the new king of Portugal after the Iberian Union. In 1633, Diogo de Sousa was appointed chairman of the Conselho da Fazenda by Philip IV and the family moved to Madrid. The young Luís entered in the household of queen Elisabeth as a page until 1646, when his family was allowed to return to Portugal after the revolution of 1640.

== Religious studies ==
In Lisbon, Luís de Sousa was admitted in the household of Prince Teodósio, the heir-apparent son of the new Portuguese king John IV, starting his religious studies in the Jesuits College of Santo Antão. On 8 February 1651 went to Rome, to the Pontifical Gregorian University, where he obtained a doctorate in canon law after what he spend some years working in the Roman Curia. It was in Rome that, most likely, Luís was ordained Priest, but there is no information about when and where it occurred.

== Priesthood and Episcopate ==
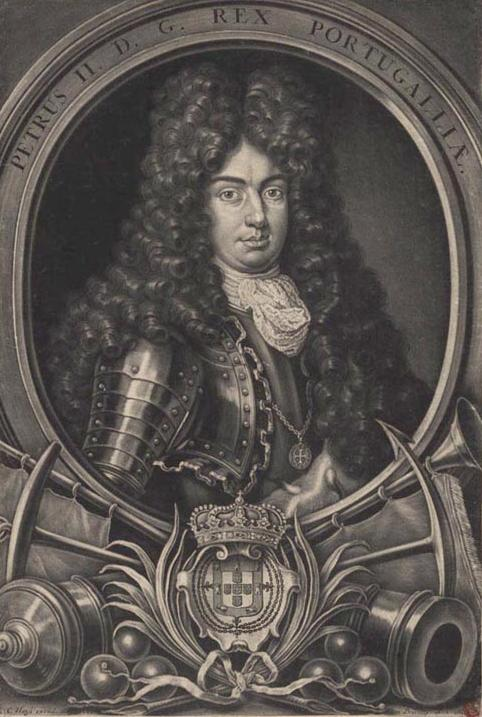
King Peter II, engraving by Elias Christoph Heiss (1660–1731).

In 1655 Pope Alexander VII appointed Luís de Sousa has Dean of the Porto Cathedral chapter. When of his return to Portugal, Luís de Sousa spent some months in Venice, Flanders, Netherlands and France, arriving to Porto on 26 September 1656.

In 1658 Luís de Sousa was named governor of the Diocese of Porto and in 1669 the Regent Peter of Braganza appointed him Governor of Porto, in the absence of Luís's brother, Henrique, ambassador in the Netherlands. In the same year, 1669, the Regent appointed Luís de Sousa as Grande Almoner, Royal Chaplain and Canon of the Lisbon Cathedral chapter.

On 19 January 1671 was appointed Titular bishop of Hippo Diarrhytus by Pope Clement X and was consecrated on 14 June of the same year, in the Royal Chapel, Ribeira Palace,> by Álvaro de São Boaventura, bishop of Guarda, assisted by Cristovão da Silveira, archbishop of Goa and Estevão dos Santos, bishop of São Salvador da Bahia. In 1674 was appointed Governor of Santa Casa da Misericórdia, a position he would get a second time, in 1683.

On 17 September 1675 the Regente requested to Pope Clement X the promotion of Luís de Sousa as Metropolitan Archbishop of Lisbon. On 2 December that year, the Pope acceded to the request and granted the pallium to the new Archbishop of Lisbon.

On 30 August 1679 Luís de Sousa was appointed Councilor of State becoming one of the most influential person in the affairs of state.

His most important legacy while Archbishop of Lisbon was the Bull Lausperene given by Innocent XI in 1682, granting the privilege of the permanent exposition of the Blessed Sacrament in the churches of Lisbon, as was practiced in Rome. This privilege had continuous renovations until 1784, when Pius VI granted a perpetual concession, that is in use until our days.

== Cardinal ==
In the Consistory of 22 July 1697, with an apostolic brief of 31 July 1697, Luís de Sousa was created cardinal priest by Pope Innocent XII, who sent him the red biretta. He never went to Rome to receive the red hat and the title. Despite this nomination Luís de Sousa remained as Royal Chaplain and Archbishop of Lisbon.

The Cardinal Luís de Sousa died in Lisbon, 3 January 1702, and was buried in the Chapel of Our Lady of Piety, in the Lisbon CathedralCloister.

== Illegitimate son and descendants ==
Luís de Sousa had a son, Leonardo de Sousa, whose biographical details are nonexistent. He married Francisca Micaela de Lemos and had a daughter, Clara Antónia de Sousa. She married Manuel de Ramires Esquível, a Fidalgo of the Royal Household, and gave origin to a large number of descendants.

== Ancestry ==
Ancestors of Luís de Sousa (cardinal)

16. Henrique de Sousa
8. Vasco de Sousa
17. Francisca de Mendonça
4. Henrique de Sousa Tavares, 1st Count of Miranda
18. Belchior de Sousa Tavares
9. Guiomar da Silva
19. Guiomar da Silva Freira
2. Diogo Lopes de Sousa, 2nd Count of Miranda
20. António da Silva
10. Fernando da Silva
21. Maria de Távora
5. Mécia de Vilhena
22. Manuel de Sousa, Lord of Miranda
11. Brites de Vilhena
23. Isabel de Paiva
1. Luís de Sousa
24. João Rodrigues de Sá, o Velho
12. Sebastião de Sá de Menezes
25. Camila Noronha
6. João Rodrigues de Sá, 1st Count of Penaguião
26. Francisco Pereira
13. Luísa Henriques
27. Joana de Tovar
3. Leonor de Mendoça
28. António de Almeida
14. João de Almeida, Lord of Sardoal
29. Joana de Menezes
7. Isabel de Mendoça
30. Simão Gonçalves da Câmara, 1st Count of Calheta
15. Leonor de Mendoça
31. Isabel de Mendoza

Catholic Church titles
Preceded by António de Mendonça	Archbishop of Lisbon; 2 December 1685 – 3 January 1702	Succeeded by João de Sousa
