= Rodrigo da Cunha =

Archbishop of Lisboa (1577–1643)

His Lordship D. Rodrigo da Cunha
- Archbishop of Lisbon
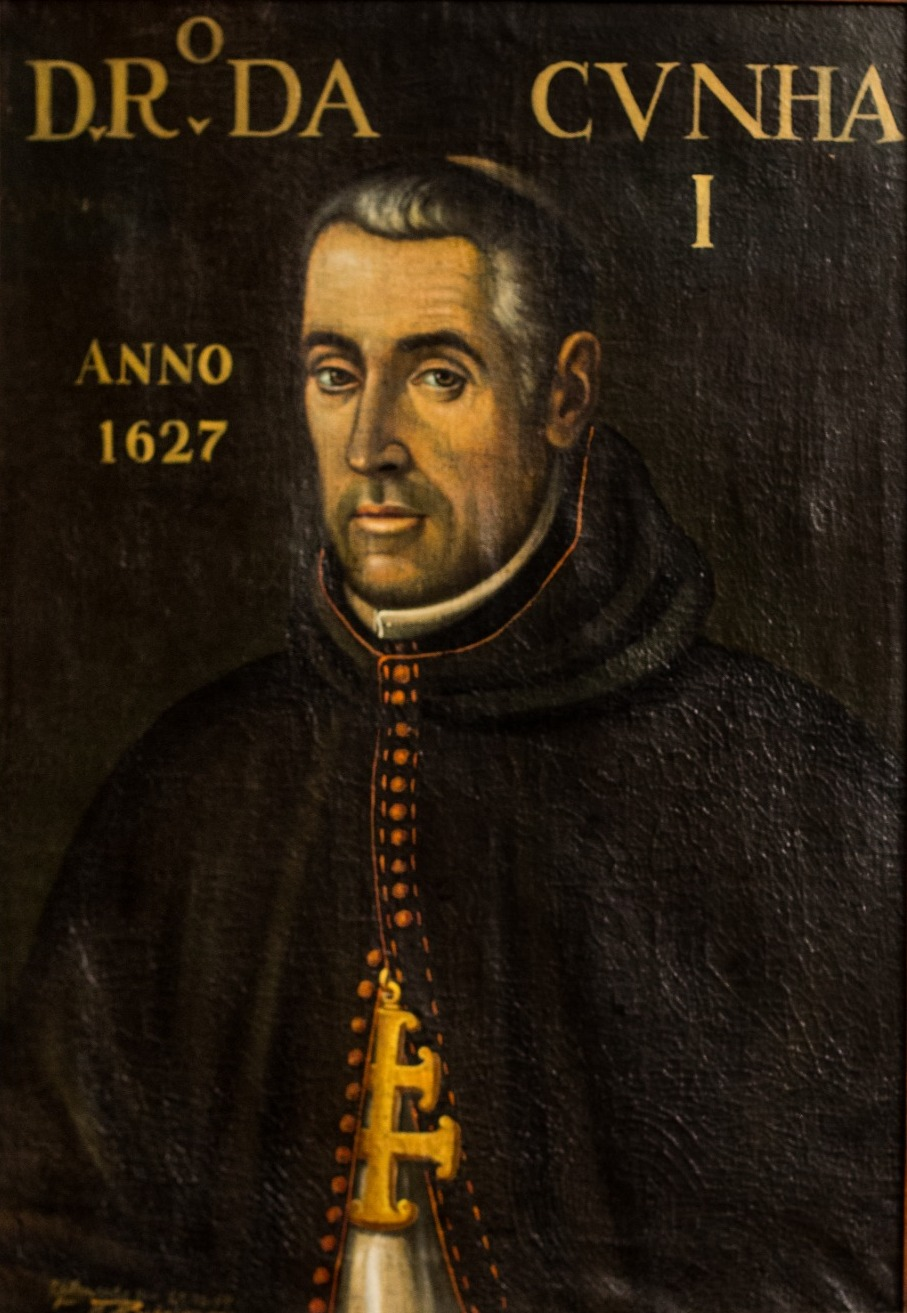
- Church: Roman Catholic Church
- Archdiocese: Lisbon
- See: Cathedral of St. Mary Major
- Installed: 3 December 1635
- Term ended: 3 January 1643
- Predecessor: João Manuel de Ataíde
- Successor: António de Mendonça
- Other posts: Archbishop of Braga (1627–35) Bishop of Portalegre (1615–18); Bishop of Porto (1618–27)

Personal details
- Born: September 1577 Lisbon, Portugal
- Died: 3 January 1643 (aged 65) Lisbon, Portugal
- Education: University of Coimbra (J.C.D.)

Styles of Rodrigo da Cunha
- Reference style: His Lordship
- Spoken style: Your Lordship

D. Rodrigo da Cunha (1577 – 3 January 1643) was a Portuguese prelate of the first half of the seventeenth century and who, as Archbishop of Lisbon, played an important role in supporting the restoration of Portuguese independence from Spain.

== Biography ==
D. Rodrigo was born in Lisbon, son of D. Pedro da Cunha, Lord of the Majorat of Tábua, and his wife Maria da Silva.

He began his studies at the College of Saint Anthony the Great (Colégio de Santo Antão), a Jesuit college in Lisbon. He received his doctorate in Canon Law at the University of Coimbra.

In his religious career, he passed the Holy Office as a deputy, and was an inquisitor in Lisbon. He was Bishop of Portalegre (1615-1618), and of Porto (1618-1626); was Archbishop of Braga (1626-1634) and Lisbon (1635-1642).

He authored the reform of the Breviário Bracarense in 1634, and presided over the Lisbon Synod of 1640.

D. Rodrigo da Cunha was one of the main opponents of the incorporation of Portugal in Spain, a policy followed by Philip IV of Spain. In 1638, he was even invited to become a cardinal in Madrid, refusing the offer.

During the Portuguese Restoration War, he supported the revolutionaries and, together with the Archbishop of Braga, ruled the kingdom until the return of João IV. His name appears as one of the main presences in the "Act of Accession and Oath of King John IV" performed on 15 December 1640. and as in the following act solemnly confirming it on 28 January 1641.

As a historian, D. Rodrigo da Cunha contributed to the historiography of the Church in Portugal, writing several works on Braga, Porto and Lisbon.

He died at the age of 65, on 3 January 1643. He is buried in the Cathedral of Lisbon.

== Works ==
- Advertencias ao Iubileu do anno de mil e seiscentos e vinte (1620)
- Catálogo e História dos Bispos do Porto (1623)
- História Eclesiástica dos Arcebispos de Braga, primeira e segunda parte (1634-1635)
- História Eclesiástica de Lisboa (1642)

== Bibliography ==
- Redacção Quidnovi, com coordenação de José Hermano Saraiva, História de Portugal, Dicionário de Personalidades, Volume XIV, Ed. QN-Edição e Conteúdos, S.A., 2004
