= Principle (disambiguation) =

A principle is a value that is a guide for behavior.

Principle may also refer to:

- Principle (chemistry), a constituent of a substance
- Principle (linguistics), a grammar rule that is invariable across languages
- Principle Pictures, US
- The Principle, term for polygamy used by certain Mormon fundamentalist practitioners; see Mormonism and polygamy
- The Principle, 2014 film by Robert Sungenis
- Principle or value in ethics
- Principle in principles and parameters
- Principles (retailer), a UK-based fashion retailer
- Principles (book), 2017, by Ray Dalio
- Jamie Principle, American musician

== See also ==
- Principal (disambiguation), easily confused word
