= Principal, Ecuador =

Town and parish in Ecuador

Coordinates: 3°01′35″S 78°45′05″W

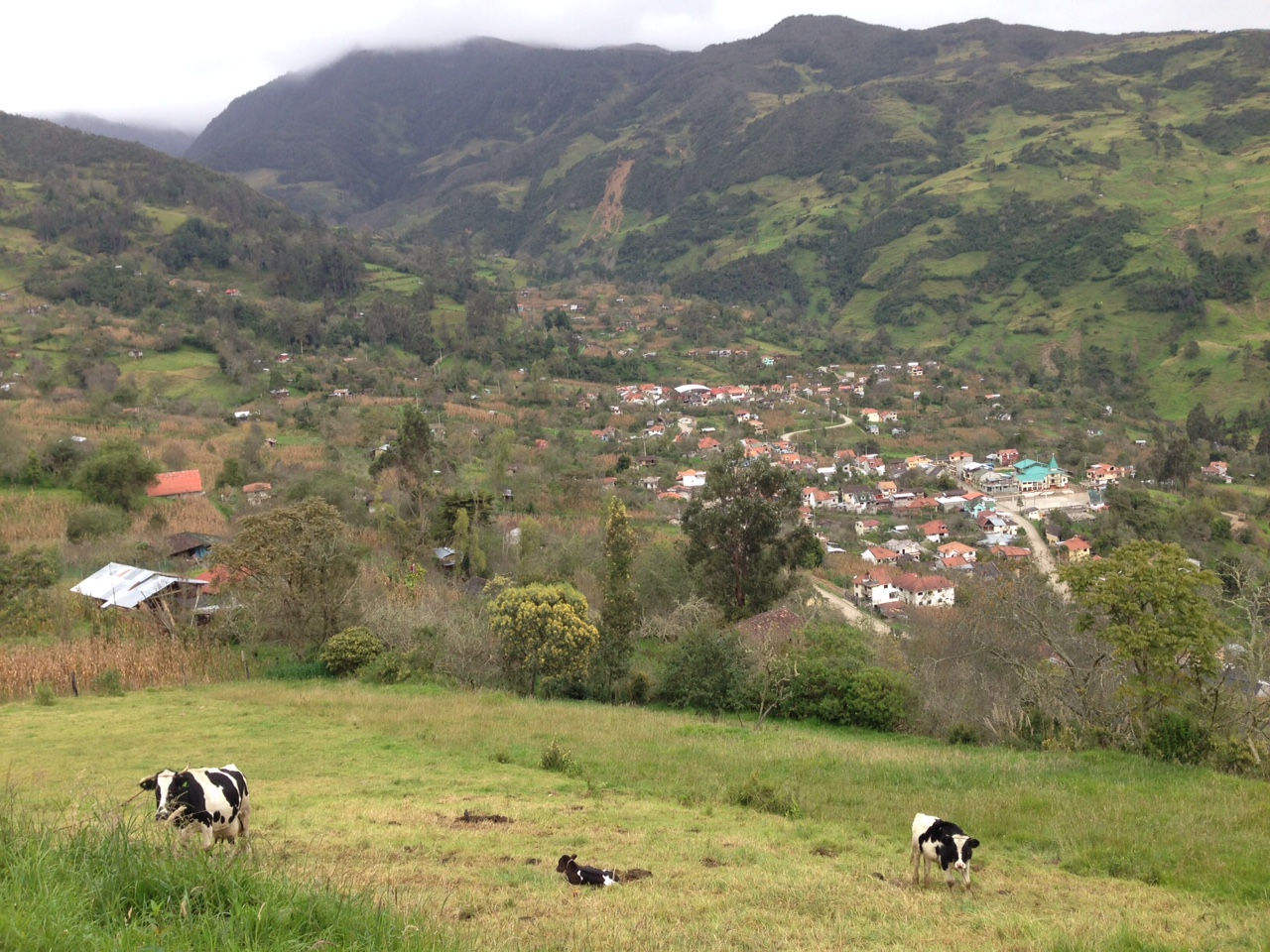
Principal as seen from the Northeastern hills

Principal is a town and rural parish in Chordeleg Canton, Azuay Province, Ecuador. It is located 18 km south of Chordeleg, and 65 km from the city of Cuenca. It was founded as a parish by an Executive Decree on June 12, 1953, under the presidency of José María Velasco Ibarra.

== Geography ==
There is a river that runs through the valley in Principal called the Rio Samba Rancho, with local trout.

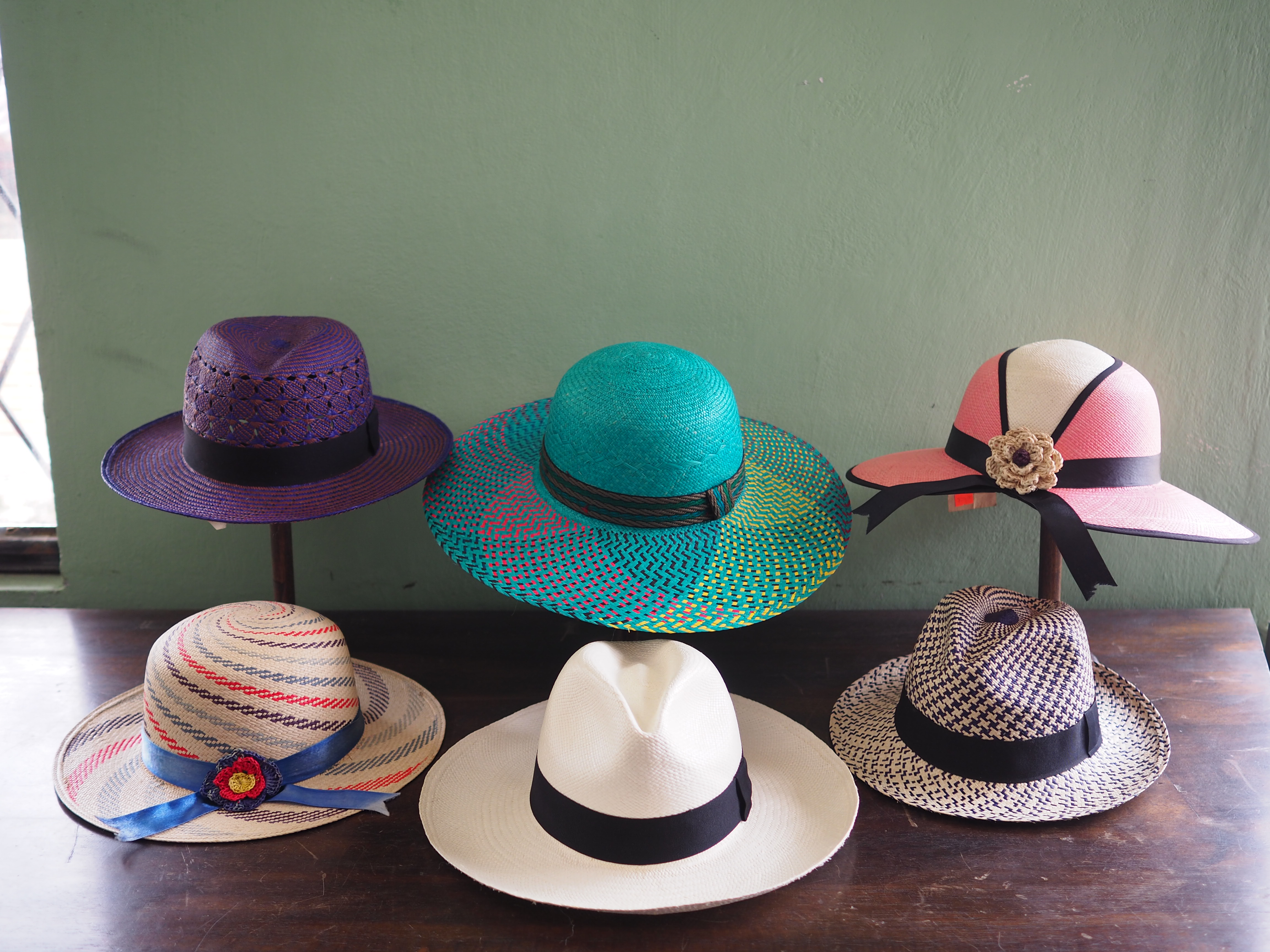
Locally weaved original Panama hats

== Culture and tourism ==
Principal is known for its secluded natural environment and artisanal products.

Each year in April the town hosts a "Festival de las Manzanas" or "Apple Festival" to showcase the fruit from the previous season. The event has many different dishes made from apples and festivities in the center of town at the "Court".

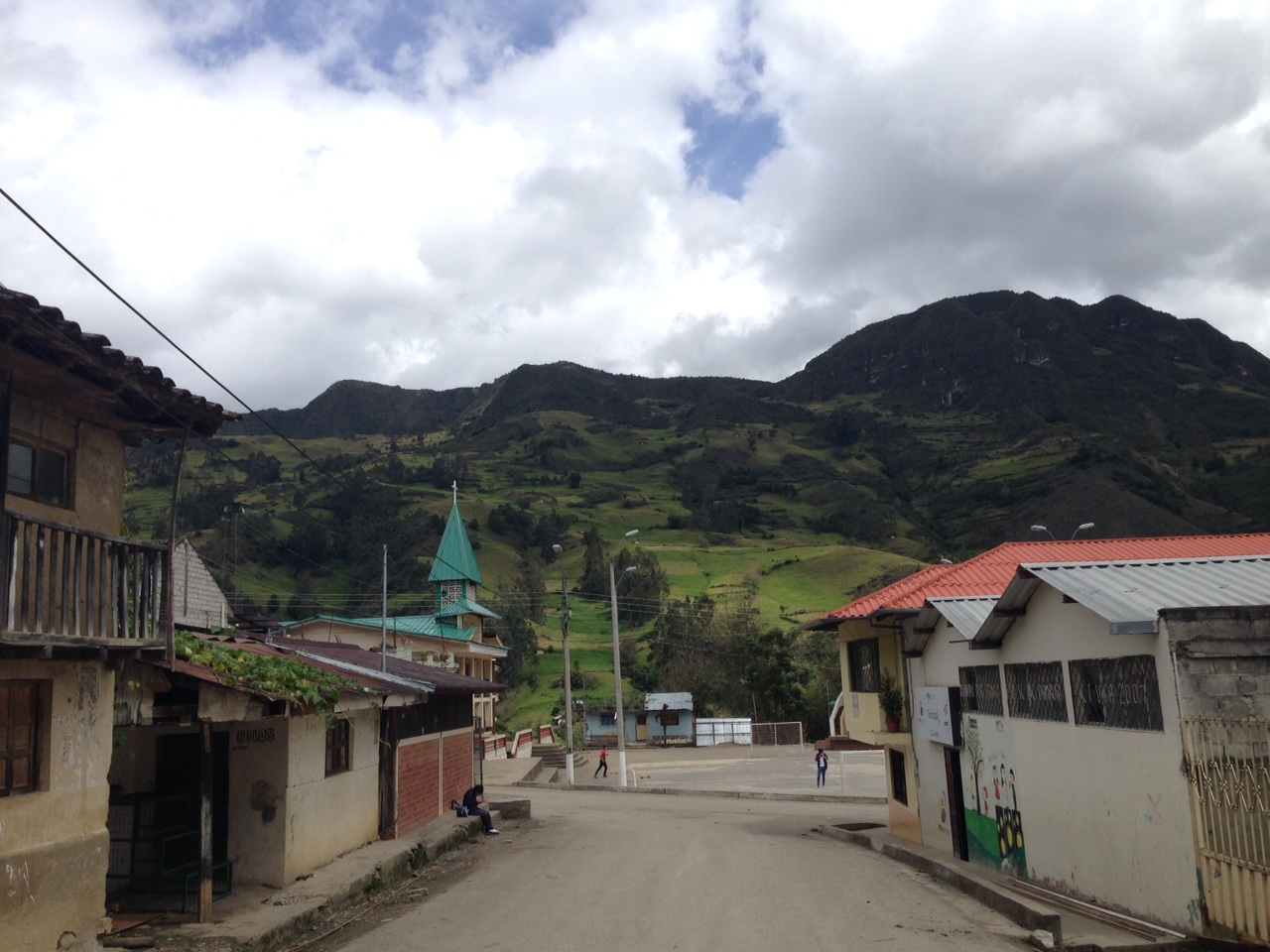
View of downtown Principal and the Southwestern hills.

The women of Principal are frequently seen in their traditional indigenous dress weaving hats while they walk down the street and go about their lives.

The guinea pig, locally named "Cuy", is a local delicacy in Ecuador and is served on special occasions in Principal.

There are a number of different artisan groups in the town who weave their products and sell them in local stores as well as in fair trade stores in Cuenca.
