= Mantius of Évora =

Saint Mantius of Évora
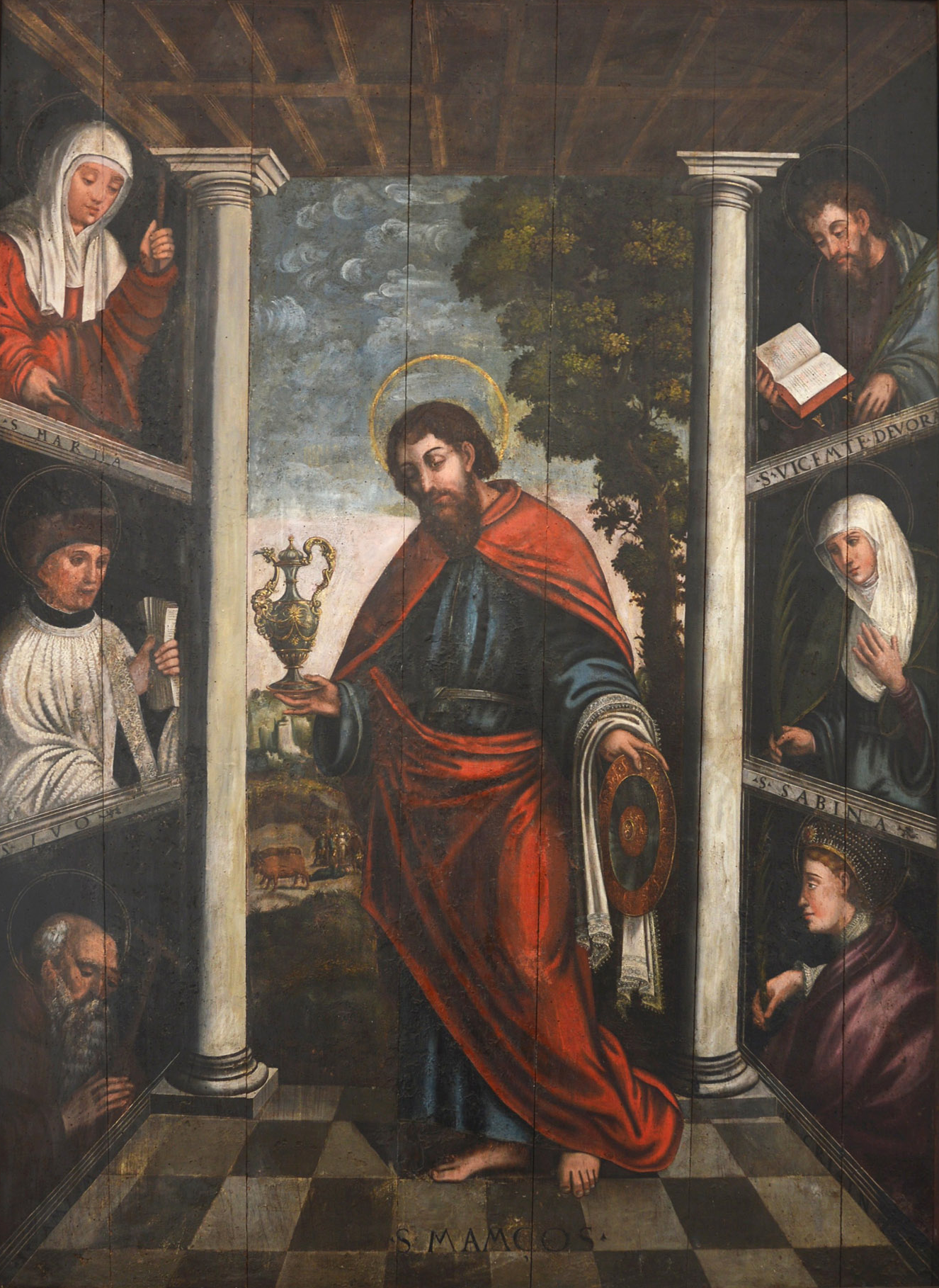

Disciple, Bishop and Martyr
- Born: 1st century AD; Rome, Roman Empire
- Died: 1st century AD; Ebora Liberalitas Julia, Lusitania (present-day Évora, Portugal)
- Venerated in: Roman Catholic Church; Eastern Orthodox Church
- Feast: 21 May

Mantius of Évora (Portuguese: São Manços) was the legendary first bishop of Lisbon and of Évora in the 1st century AD. In some versions of his legend, he was one of the disciples of Jesus Christ, who was sent to preach the Gospel in Lusitania.

== Legend ==
According to the most well-known version, known from at least the 16th century (recounted in André de Resende's Breviário Eborense, 1548), he was born in Rome and, converting to Christianity, went to Jerusalem, where he was able to meet Jesus Christ and be one of His disciples. Mantius would even have participated in the Last Supper and witnessed Pentecost. He would have been, therefore, among the seventy disciples.

After the crucifixion of Jesus, he was sent out as a missionary of the Gospel and, after passing through Gaul (where he performed a miracle in the name of Jesus in the town of Châlons-en-Champagne, restoring to life a young nobleman who had drowned), continued into Hispanic lands and arrived in Lusitania. He preached in the Alentejo region, where he converted many people, and arrived at Évora, where he established a Christian community, presided over by him as the first bishop. A later tradition also has Mantius travelling to Lisbon and founding a new community there, also becoming their first bishop. Neither of the two traditions has historical basis, and both dioceses date instead from around the 4th century.

The Roman persecution of Christian communities would have Mantius imprisoned; after refusing to offer sacrifices to the pagan gods, he was martyred near Évora, traditionally in the site nowadays occupied by the civil parish of São Manços.

== Veneration ==
The first written reference to Saint Mantius dates back to 1195, and devotion to the saint spread in the end of the 13th century, possibly following the arrival of his presumed relics in Castile.

According to the same tradition, the relics of Saint Mantius were in the church of São Manços but, in order to save them from Muslim invaders, they were brought in 714 to Asturias as were the remains of other saints. In 1070, Gutierre Téllez de Meneses would have had a dream in which Saint Mantius told him to take his relics to Castile. Thus the relics arrived at what today is Villanueva de San Mancio, in the province of Valladolid, near Medina de Rioseco, Spain; the authorities would not let him enter the town with the saint's remains, so the knight founded a monastery on the outskirts, with the support of the Benedictine monks of Sahagún, where the relics were left — the town subsequently grew around the monastery.

In the last Roman Martyrology he is called "martyr" and is said to die in the VI century.
