= Principal (Catholic Church) =

Honorific title in the Catholic Church

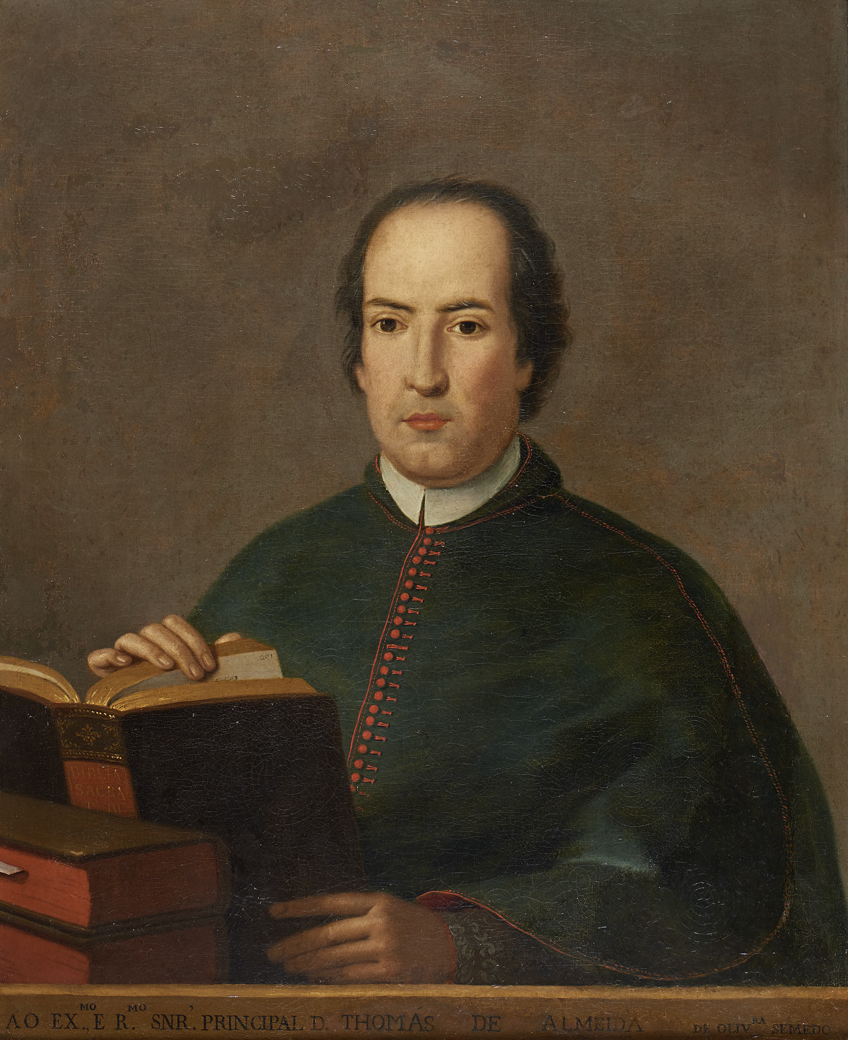
Tomás de Almeida (1706–1786), Principal Dean of the Holy Patriarchal Church of Lisbon

Principal (Portuguese: Principal, Portuguese pronunciation: [pɾĩsiˈpal]; pl. Principais), or more formally, Principal of the Holy Patriarchal Church of Lisbon (Portuguese: Principal da Santa Igreja Patriarcal de Lisboa), was the honorific title granted to the canons of the chapter of the Patriarchal See of Lisbon by the papal bull Salvatoris nostri Mater, issued by Pope Benedict XIV in 1740.

The Patriarchal Chapter, comprising twenty-four Principals presided over by the Principal Dean (Principal Deão), was modelled after the College of Cardinals (and was indeed formally styled "College of Principals"), and was similarly divided into three orders: Principal Primaries (Principais Primários), Principal Priests (Principais Presbíteros), and Principal Deacons (Principais Diáconos). Also evoking the grandeur of the papal court, the Principals dressed in scarlet cassocks in the manner of cardinals.

The title and extraordinary rights of vesture ceased to be used in 1834, following the Liberal Wars and the establishment of a liberal constitutional monarchy in the country.
