= Nuno da Cunha e Ataíde =

Portuguese Cardinal

His Eminence Nuno da Cunha e Ataíde
- Cardinal, Titular Bishop of Targa; Inquisitor-General of Portugal
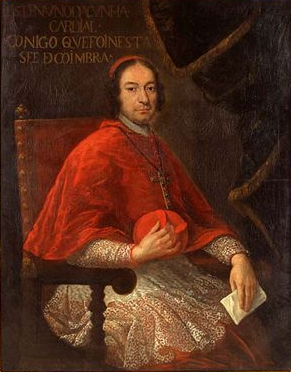
- Other post: Cardinal-Priest of Sant'Anastasia al Palatino
- Previous post: Bishop of Elvas (1705)

Orders
- Consecration: 14 March 1706 by Álvaro de Abranches e Noronha
- Created cardinal: 18 May 1712 by Pope Clement XI
- Rank: Cardinal-Priest

Personal details
- Born: 7 December 1664 São José, Lisbon, Portugal
- Died: 3 December 1750 (aged 85) Santa Justa, Lisbon, Portugal
- Denomination: Roman Catholic

- Coat of arms

Nuno da Cunha de Ataíde e Melo (7 December 1664 – 3 December 1750), more commonly referred to as Cardinal da Cunha, was a Portuguese Cardinal of the Catholic Church, and a politically important figure as a close advisor to King John V. Cardinal da Cunha occupied several positions at Court, as the King's chief chaplain, a chief minister ("ministro do despacho") and a significant member of the Council of State; he is perhaps most well-remembered as the Inquisitor-General of the Tribunal of the Holy Office from 1707 until his death in 1750.

== Biography ==
Nuno da Cunha was born in the parish of São José in Lisbon, the son of Luís da Cunha e Ataíde, 9th Lord of Povolide (1619-1672), and his wife D. Guiomar de Lencastre (1631-1665). His eldest brother, Tristão da Cunha Ataíde (1655-1728) would later be created 1st Count of Povolide. He studied at the University of Coimbra, first Theology, but then switched to Canon Law, in which he earned his degree.

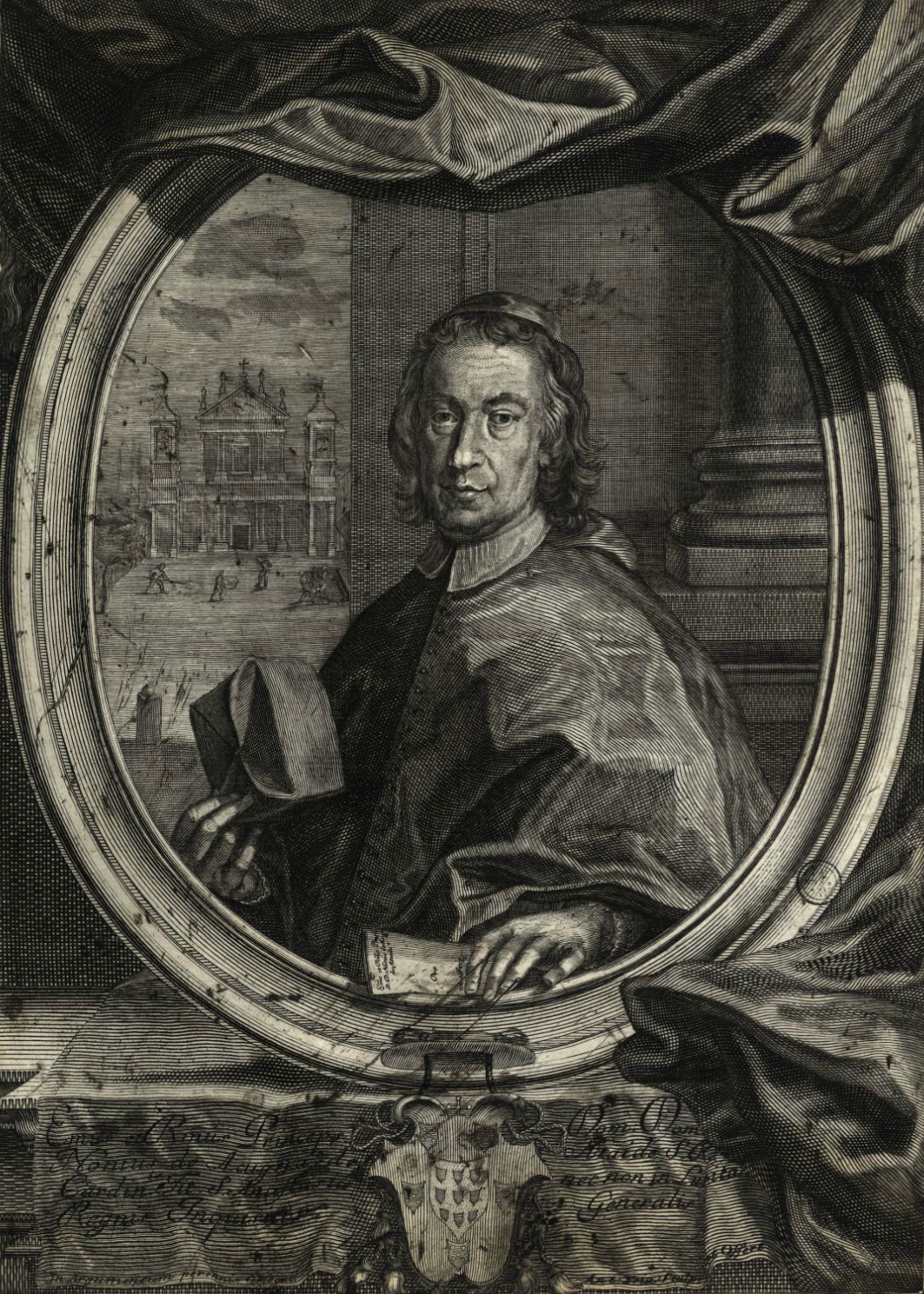
Cardinal da Cunha, National Library of Portugal

He was first a canon of the Diocese of Coimbra, but soon afterwards started his career within the Inquisition, first in Coimbra and then in Lisbon. King Peter II appointed Nuno da Cunha as his chaplain of honour (sumilher da cortina) and, in 1702, made him a member of the Council of the Three Estates (Junta dos Três Estados). In 1705 he was made the King's chief chaplain and was nominated Bishop of Elvas, but refused this latter appointment: he was instead consecrated Titular Bishop of Targa (in the Ancient Roman province of Africa Proconsularis) the following year. After the death of Peter II and the accession of his son King John V (in whose education Nuno da Cunha had played a part), he was offered several more positions of political importance at Court. In 1707, he was made Inquisitor-General of Portugal and, in 1712, Cardinal-Priest of Sant'Anastasia al Palatino.

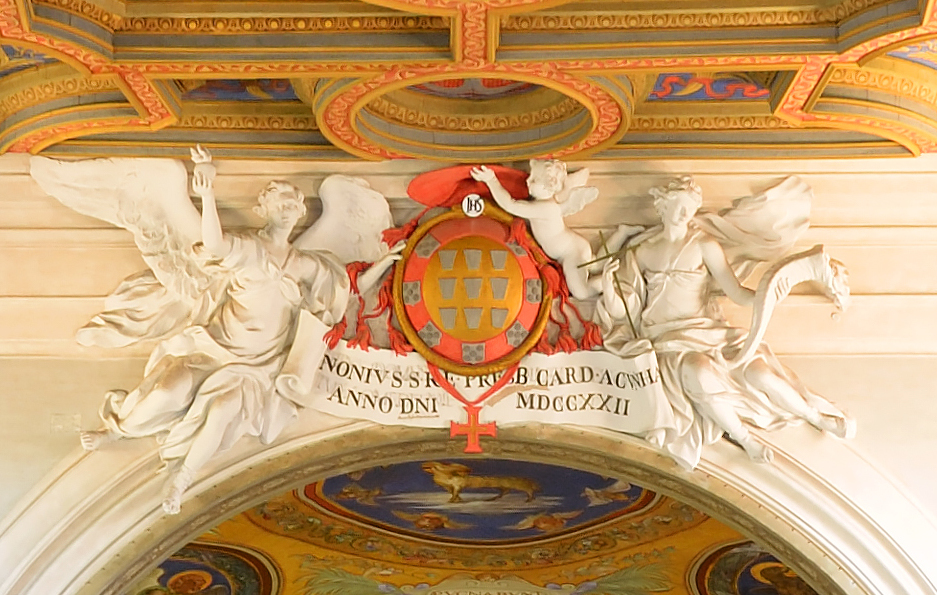
Arms of Cardinal da Cunha in Sant'Anastasia al Palatino, Rome

Following the death of Pope Clement XI in 1721, he was summoned to that year's papal conclave. He departed Lisbon on 9 May aboard a Portuguese carrack; arriving at the port of Leorne on 19 May, he received news that Cardinal Michelangelo dei Conti had already been elected pope, as Innocent XIII. He was subsequently received in Rome with "special demonstrations of paternal benevolence" by the new Pontiff (who already knew Nuno da Cunha from his time as Apostolic Nuncio to Portugal from 1698 to 1706). During his time in Rome, Cardinal da Cunha was occupied in several assignments with the Congregations for Bishops, for Regulars, for the Propagation of the Faith, for Rites, and for Consistorial Provisions. Also during this time, he sponsored major works at great personal expense on his titular church of Sant'Anastasia al Palatino.

He only arrived back in Portugal on October 1722, having travelled by land and stopping on places of pilgrimage along the way. In Ancona, he made two precious offerings to Our Lady of Loreto ("a large golden cross, set with thick sapphires surrounded by diamonds", and "a precious ornament of gold over lapis lazuli and decorated with hieroglyphs, to adorn the niche"). On 3 June 1722, a rare private ostension of the Shroud of Turin was held for Cardinal da Cunha at the Chapel of the Holy Shroud.

After his death, according to the official gazette, Cardinal da Cunha's body was dissected and embalmed by two surgeons using a new technique: the procedure took seven and a half hours. He was interred, following his own instructions, in the Chapter House of the Monastery of Saint Dominic in Lisbon, under a plain ledger stone.

Catholic Church titles
Preceded by Bernardinus a San Antonio	Titular Bishop of Targa; 1705–1721	Succeeded by Agostino Nicola degl'Abbati Olivieri
Preceded by José de Lencastre	Inquisitor-General of Portugal; 1707–1750	Succeeded by Joseph of Braganza
Preceded by Giandomenico Paracciani	Cardinal-Priest of Sant'Anastasia al Palatino; 1712–1750	Succeeded by Carlo Maria Sacripante
