= João Anes =

Dom João Anes (or João Eanes) (died 3 May 1402) was bishop (since 1384) and also the first archbishop of Lisbon.

== Biography ==
His place and date of birth are unknown. He was nominated as bishop of Lisbon soon after the assassination of his predecessor, Bishop Dom Martinho, who was defenestrated by the citizens when Lisbon was besieged by the Castilians in 1383, under suspicion of conspiring with the enemy.

In 1393, Lisbon was elevated from a simple diocese to an archdiocese, by a bull of Pope Boniface IX, with Dom João named as the first archbishop. Due to his friendship with King João, he also participated in the peace negotiations between Portugal and Castile. In 1397, he announced a new parish within the diocese of Lisbon, Santa Maria dos Olivais, created out of the parishes of Sacavém and Beato.

He died in Lisbon. He was succeeded by João Afonso Esteves de Azambuja.
