= Gilbert of Hastings =

12th-century English monk who became the first Bishop of Lisbon

Gilbert de Hastings
- Bishop of Lisbon
- Church: Roman Catholic
- See: Diocese of Lisbon
- In office: 1147–1166
- Predecessor: Vacant
- Successor: Álvaro

Personal details
- Born: England
- Died: 27 April 1166 Lisbon, Portugal

Gilbert de Hastings (Portuguese: Gilberto de Hastings; died 1166) was an English monk in the Christian army of the Second Crusade who fought in the Siege of Lisbon. After the victory, he was chosen to be the first Bishop of Lisbon. Prior to his incumbency, the see of Lisbon was occupied by a Bishop of the Mozarabic Rite, that was killed by the pillaging crusaders, as described by the crusader monk Osbernus in De expugniatione Lyxbonensi (The Conquest of Lisbon). His antecedents are unclear, but it seems probable that he was a younger son of the well-known Anglo-Norman de Hastings family who held the Lordship of the Manor of Ashill in Norfolk, and who, at this time, were Hereditary Stewards of the Abbey of Bury St Edmunds.

== Notes ==
Catholic Church titles
Preceded by None	Bishop of Lisbon; 1147–1166	Succeeded by Álvaro
