= Sumilher da cortina =

Officer of the Portuguese royal household

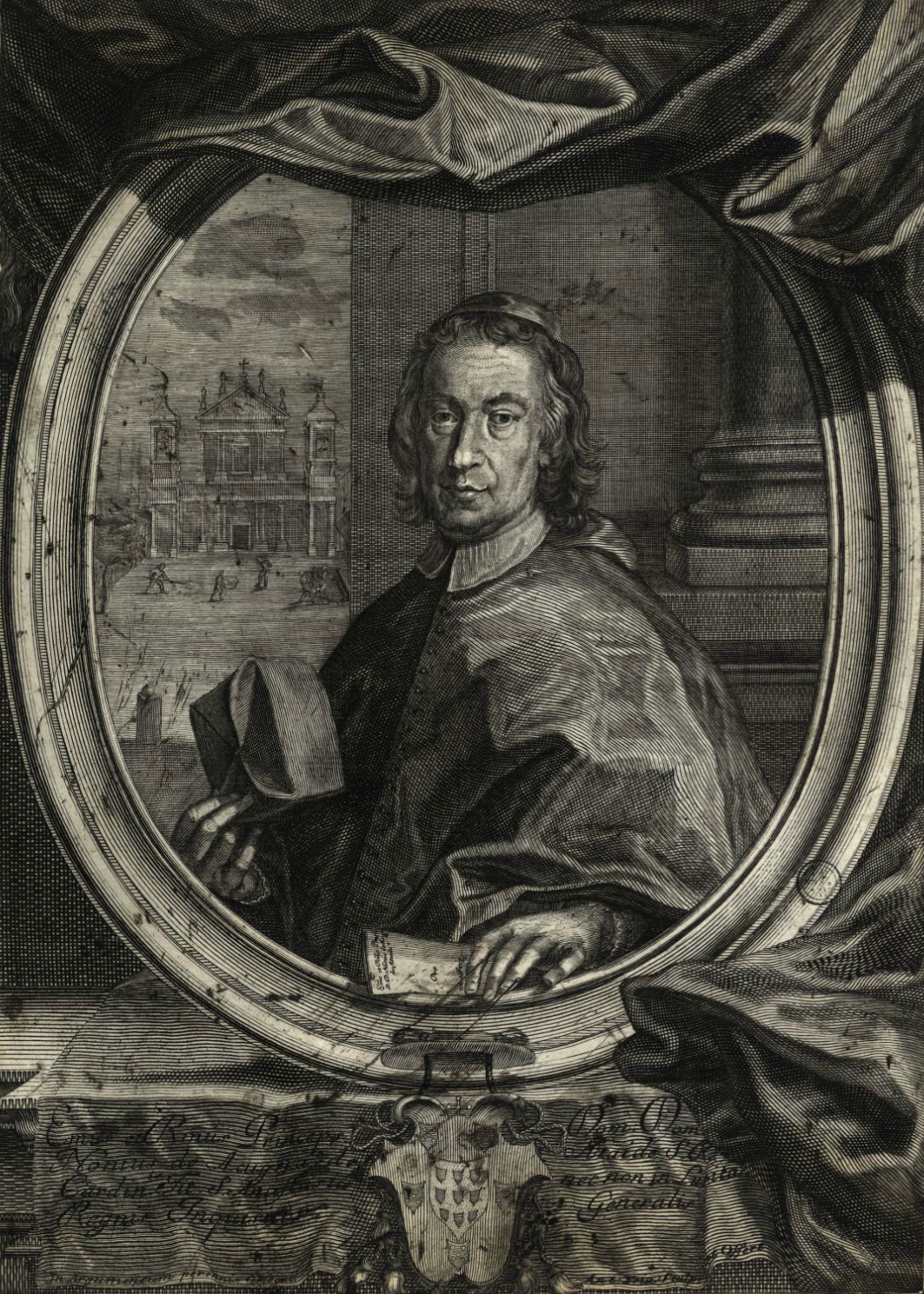
The first of Nuno da Cunha e Ataíde's courtly positions was that of sumilher da cortina

A sumilher da cortina (Portuguese pronunciation: [sumiˈʎɛɾ ðɐ kuɾˈtinɐ], lit. official of the curtain, usually rendered in English as chaplain of honour) was an officer of the Portuguese royal household, chosen from among the kingdom's most important prelates, of noble background.

The sumilher da cortina was responsible for drawing the curtain of the gallery of the Royal Chapel as the king entered for divine office; he was tasked as well with removing the dust guard off the king's kneeler for his prayers, and with cleaning the Gospel Book and the pax before the king could kiss them. The sumilher da cortina additionally drew the king's bed hangings at night and in the morning.

There was no fixed number of sumilheres da cortina. King Peter II named several sumilheres da cortina, and most were the sons of important court figures.
