= Lisbon Cathedral =

Roman Catholic cathedral located in Lisbon, Portugal

Patriarchal Metropolitan Cathedral of Saint Mary Major
- Santa Maria Maior de Lisboa (Portuguese)
- Façade of the Lisbon Cathedral

- Location within Lisbon

Religion
- Affiliation: Roman Catholic
- Rite: Roman
- Ecclesiastical or organisational status: cathedral
- Leadership: D. Rui Valério

Location
- Location: Lisbon, Portugal
- Coordinates: 38°42′35″N 9°07′59″W

Architecture
- Type: Church
- Style: Romanesque, Gothic, Baroque

Specifications
- Direction of façade: W
- Length: 90 metres (300 ft)
- Width: 40 metres (130 ft)
- Height (max): 12 metres (39 ft)
- Portuguese National Monument
- Official name: Sé de Lisboa
- Designated: 10 January 1907
- Reference no.: PT031106520004

Website
- www.sedelisboa.pt

The Cathedral of Saint Mary Major (Portuguese: Santa Maria Maior de Lisboa or Sé-Catedral Metropolitana Patriarcal de Santa Maria Maior de Lisboa), often called Lisbon Cathedral or simply the Sé (Sé de Lisboa), is a Roman Catholic cathedral located in Lisbon, Portugal. It is the oldest church in the city, built in 1147. The cathedral has survived many earthquakes and has been modified, renovated and restored several times, resulting in a mix of different architectural styles. It is the seat of the Patriarchate of Lisbon, and has been classified as a National Monument since 1910.

== History ==
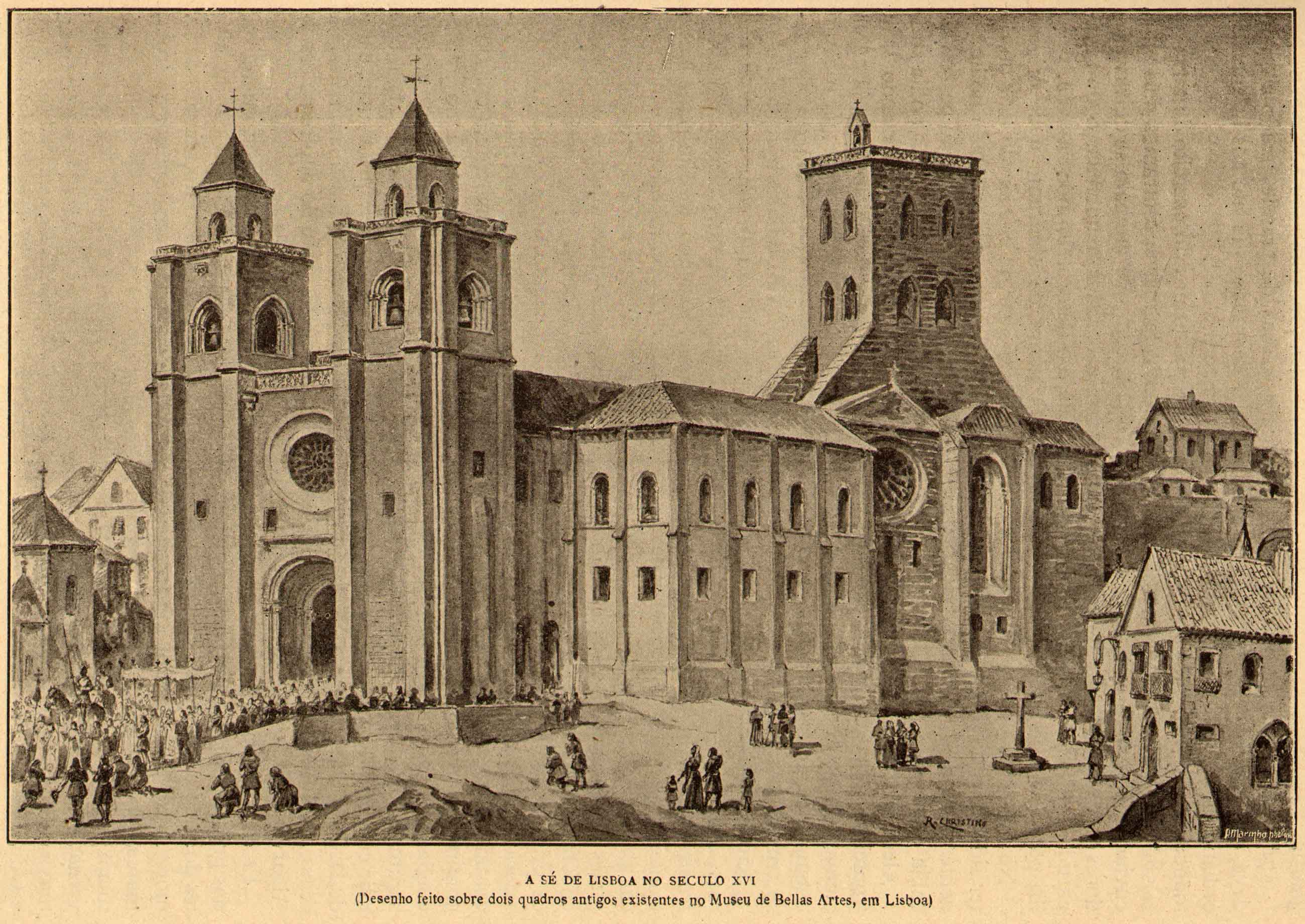
Recreation of Lisbon Cathedral of the 16th century by Alfredo Roque Gameiro (1864–1935) according to existing 16th c. paintings

Lisbon has been the seat of a bishopric since the 4th century (see Patriarch of Lisbon). After the period of Visigothic domination, the city was conquered by the Moors and stayed under Arab control from the 8th to the 12th century, although Christians were allowed to live in Lisbon and its surroundings. In the year 1147, the city was reconquered by an army composed of Portuguese soldiers led by King Afonso Henriques and North European crusaders taking part in the Second Crusade (see Siege of Lisbon). An English crusader named Gilbert of Hastings was installed as bishop, and a new cathedral was built on the site of the main mosque of Lisbon.

This first building, in Late Romanesque style, was completed between 1147 and the first decades of the 13th century. At that time, the relics of St Vincent of Saragossa, patron saint of Lisbon, were brought to the cathedral from Southern Portugal. In the late 13th century, King Dinis of Portugal built a Gothic cloister and his successor, Afonso IV of Portugal, had the main chapel converted into a royal pantheon in Gothic style for him and his family. In 1498, Queen Eleanor of Viseu founded the Irmandade de Invocação a Nossa Senhora da Misericórdia de Lisboa (Brotherhood of Invocation to Our Lady of Mercy of Lisbon ) in one of the chapels of the cathedral cloister. This brotherhood evolved into the Santa Casa da Misericórdia de Lisboa, a Catholic charitable institution that later spread to other cities and had a very important role in Portugal and its colonies.

During the Portuguese interregnum of 1383–85, the populace suspected that Bishop Dom Martinho Annes was plotting with the Castilians and an angry crowd threw him out of the window of the northern tower.

Earthquakes have always been a problem for Lisbon and its cathedral. There were several in the 14th and 16th centuries, but the worst of all was the 1755 Lisbon earthquake, which destroyed the Gothic main chapel along with the royal pantheon. The cloisters and many chapels were also ruined by the quake and the fire that followed. The cathedral was partially rebuilt and an extensive renovation in the early 20th century gave it its current appearance.

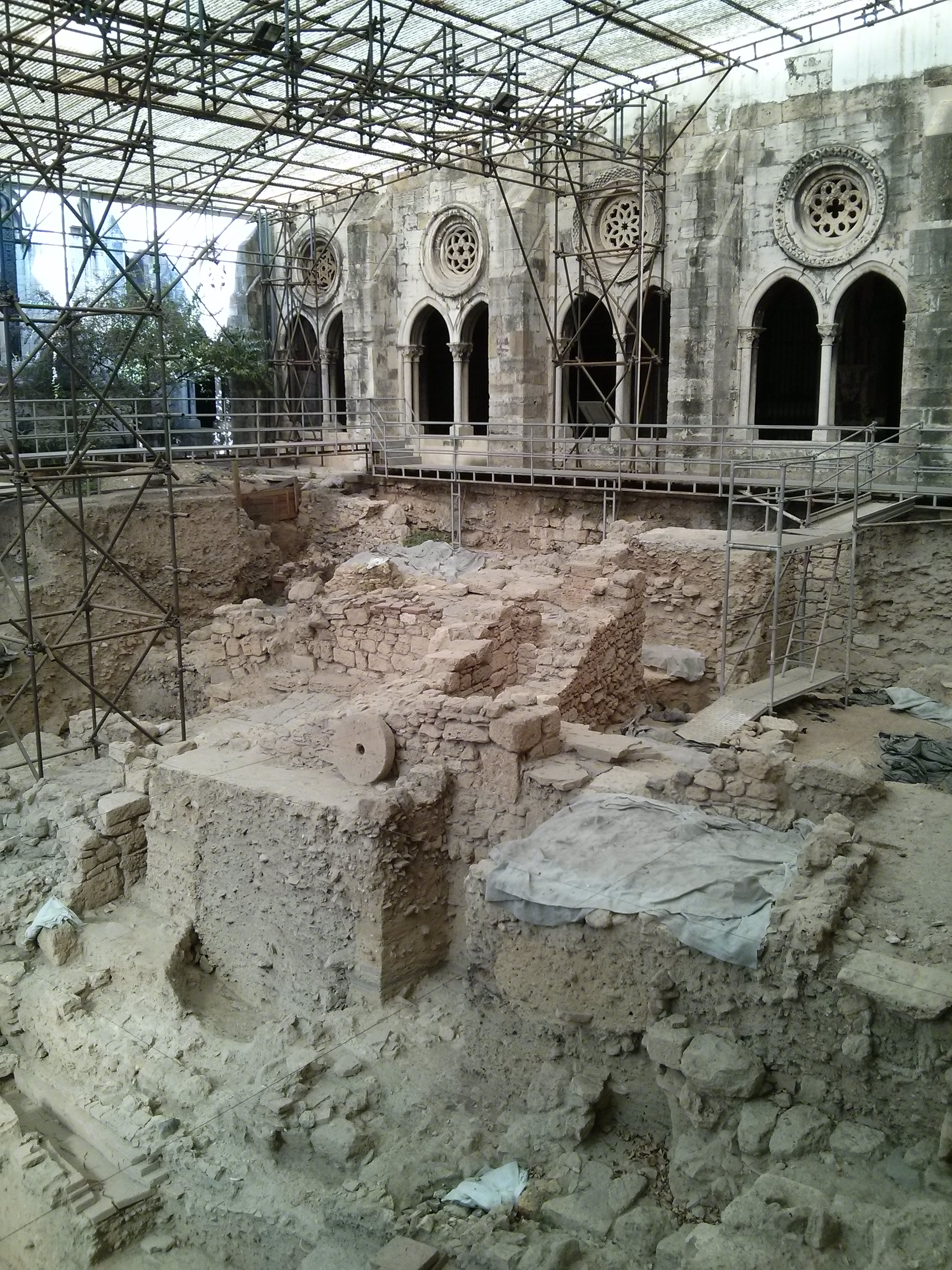
Archaeological excavations in Cathedral cloisters

In recent years, the central courtyard of the cloister has been excavated and remains from the Roman, Visigothic and mediaeval periods have been found. Excavations started in the cloister in 1990 and revealed a Roman road with shops on either side, part of a Roman kitchen and a "cloaca" (sewage system), as well as traces of later Visigoth buildings. A section of red walls was also excavated, showing remains of a mosque which had once stood on this site.

In 2020, Graça Fonseca, the Portuguese Minister of Culture, determined that the Muslim remains should be preserved.

== Art and architecture ==
The cathedral is in the shape of a Latin cross with three aisles, a transept and a main chapel surrounded by an ambulatory. The church is connected with a cloister on the eastern side. The main façade of the cathedral looks like a fortress, with two towers flanking the entrance and crenellations over the walls. This menacing appearance, also seen in other Portuguese cathedrals of the time, is a relic from the Reconquista period, when the cathedral may have been used as a base to attack the enemy during a siege.

=== Romanesque ===
From its first building period (1147 until the first decades of the 13th century), Lisbon cathedral has preserved the West façade with a rose window (rebuilt from fragments in the 20th century), the main portal, the North lateral portal and the nave of the cathedral. The portals have interesting sculptured capitals with Romanesque motifs. The nave is covered by barrel vaulting and has an upper, arched gallery (triforium). Light gets in through the rose windows of the West façade and transept, the narrow windows of the lateral aisles of the nave as well as the windows of the lantern tower of the transept. The general plan of the cathedral is very similar to that of the Old Cathedral of Coimbra, which dates from the same period. One of the chapels of the ambulatory has an interesting Romanesque iron gate.

Elevated view of the nave towards the chancel

Interior view of the rose window in the west façade

=== Gothic ===
At the end of the 13th century King Dinis of Portugal ordered the construction of a cloister in Gothic style, which became severely damaged by the 1755 earthquake. Near the entrance of the cathedral, a rich merchant, Bartolomeu Joanes, built a funerary chapel for himself in the beginning of the 14th century. His tomb with his laying figure is still inside. Somewhat later, King Afonso IV of Portugal had the Romanesque apse replaced by a Gothic main chapel surrounded by an ambulatory with radiating chapels. The king and his family were buried in the main chapel, but their tombs and the chapel itself were destroyed in the 1755 earthquake. The ambulatory has survived and is an important work in the history of Portuguese Gothic. It consists of a circular aisle – not connected to the main chapel – with a series of radiating chapels. The second storey of the ambulatory is covered by ribbed vaulting and has a series of windows (clerestory) that bathe the interior with abundant light.

Tomb of Lopo Fernandes Pacheco

The ambulatory contains three outstanding Gothic tombs from the mid-14th century. One tomb belongs to Lopo Fernandes Pacheco, 7th Lord of Ferreira de Aves, a nobleman at the service of King Afonso IV. His laying figure appears holding his sword and is guarded by a dog. His wife, Maria de Vilalobos, appears over her tomb reading a Book of Hours. The third tomb belongs to an unidentified royal princess. All tombs are decorated with coats-of-arms.

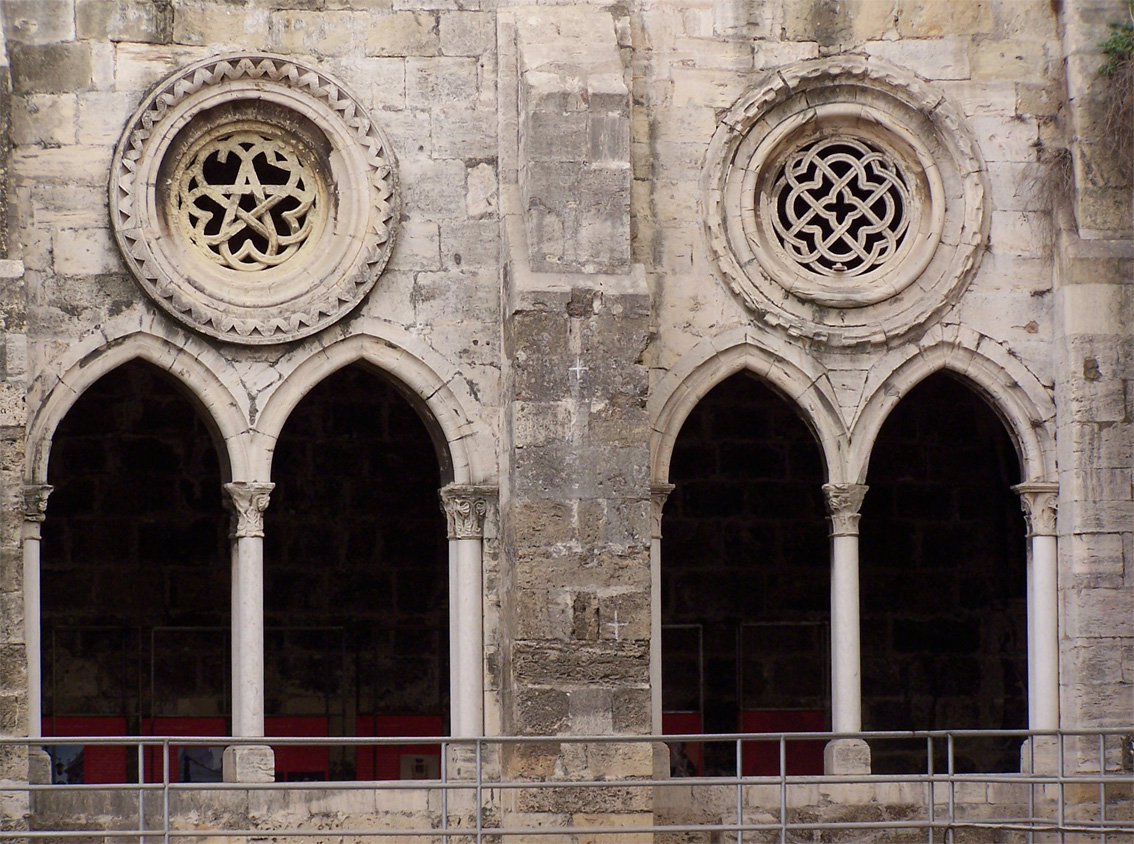
Gothic cloister of Lisbon Cathedral. Each oculum over the twin arches has a different tracery pattern.

In the last quarter of the 15th century it is believed that the famous Saint Vincent Panels, painted by Nuno Gonçalves, were placed in the St Vincent chapel of the ambulatory. They remained there at least until 1690 and were set aside in the cathedral until 1742. They were then transferred to the palace of Mitra. The panels are now in the Museu Nacional de Arte Antiga (National Museum of Ancient Art) in Lisbon.

=== Modern times ===
Chancel arch and painted vault of the presbytery

During the 17th century a fine sacristy was built in Baroque architectural style and, after 1755, the main chapel was rebuilt in neoclassical and Rococo styles (including the tombs of King Afonso IV and his family). Machado de Castro, Portugal's foremost sculptor in the late 18th century, is the author of a magnificent crib in the Gothic chapel of Bartomoleu Joanes. In the beginning of the 20th century, much of the neoclassical decoration from outside and inside of the cathedral was removed to give the cathedral a more "mediaeval" appearance.
