= Sílvia Cardoso =

Venerable Sílvia Cardoso
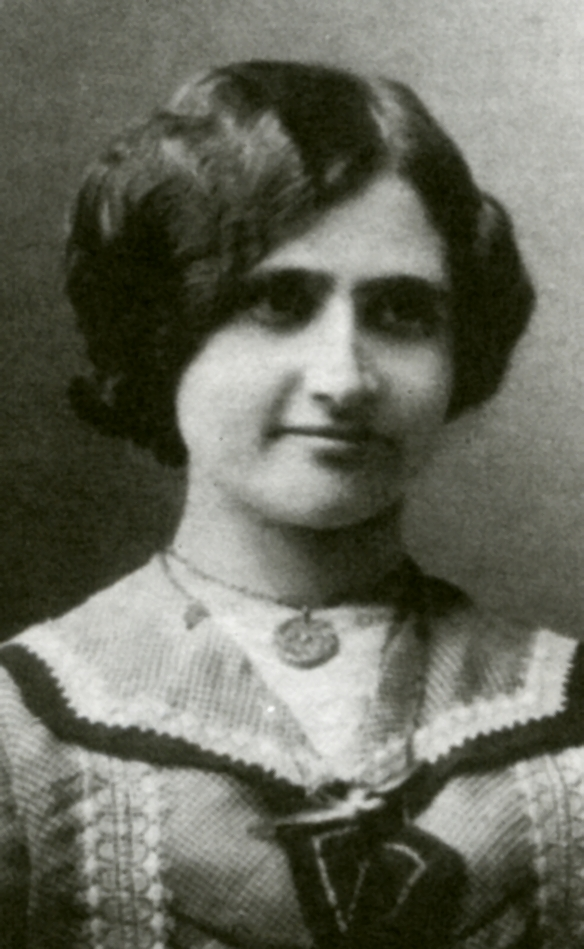
- Born: 26 July 1882; Paços de Ferreira, Porto, Portugal
- Died: 2 November 1950 (aged 68); Paços de Ferreira, Porto, Portugal

Sílvia Cardoso Ferreira da Silva (26 July 1882 – 2 November 1950) was a Portuguese Roman Catholic. During her lifetime she led a tireless apostolate dedicated to serving the poor in Brazil (where she travelled to and once lived) and in her native land where she founded retreat centers and soup kitchens. In addition to these initiatives with her own resources she funded a boarding school for girls but divested most of her time and effort in a hospital that she sought to improve on following its inauguration.

The initial steps for her beatification process started in the 1970s but the formal introduction for the cause came in 1984 – she became titled as a Servant of God. The cause reached a decisive point in 2013 after Pope Francis acknowledged her heroic virtue and named her as vVenerable.

== Life ==
Sílvia Cardoso Ferreira da Silva was born in 1882 in Paços de Ferreira in Porto as the first of four children to the devout Umbelino Manuel Ferreira da Silva (1851–1918) and Joaquina da Conceição Emilia Cardoso (1847-19.7.1936). Her baptism was celebrated that 4 August in the Santa Eulalia parish church. In 1883 she moved alongside her parents to Brazil but would return to her native Portugal in 1889.

Cardoso made her First Communion on 23 April 1892 in her hometown and then in 1896 enrolled in a school at Vila Nova de Gaia alongside her sister Maria Haydée. But she attended private lessons under a tutoren before she enrolled in that school where she studied art and was given Piano lessons; following her time at Vila Nova de Gaia she studied at a college in another area. Cardoso received her Confirmation on 23 October 1903 from the Bishop of Porto António José de Sousa Barroso. On 20 January 1911, she made a private vow of service to God with the intent of evangelizing and ministering to others. The unexpected death of her fiancée Acácio Umbelino Pereira da Silva (whom she became engaged to in 1912) on 24 November 1913 in Brazil (close to their wedding date) enabled Cardoso to go to London to take care of their affairs before returning to Brazil in 1914 following the death of her older brother Ângelo who died in Lisbon. Her fiancée had been an unbeliever but was later converted to the faith and upon his death left all he had to Cardoso. In 1916 she received a prize for having won a competition for floriculture in Porto. In 1917 – while she attended a retreat for the Spiritual Exercises – she made a private vow to remain chaste; Cardoso never married following the death of her fiancée.

In 1918 her cousin, the artist Amadeo de Souza Cardoso, died as did her father not long after. In mid-October 1918 she contracted a flu that evolved into pneumonia as a result of the Spanish flu spreading across Europe though she managed to recover unlike others who succumbed to the outbreak. In 1918 she helped in the foundation of a new hospital in her hometown using her own funds; it was inaugurated on 14 March 1919 after which she served from 1920 until 1925 as the hospital's vice-president for the administrative commission. In 1921 she again entered an floriculture competition and received a gold medal for her contribution in the exhibition. In 1921 she set up a boarding school for girls. On 21 January 1923 she began organizing retreats for people and in 1925 travelled to Rome for the jubilee that Pope Pius XI convoked; she hired a carriage for her friends, including the poet Dr. Queiroz Ribeiro. In 1928 she helped establish a pavilion in the hospital for patients suffering from infectious-contagious diseases. In 1940 she donated land to establish a home for the elderly. Cardoso also established homes for abandoned children whom she dedicated herself to helping and on one occasion learned that a child was considering the priesthood so encouraged him to pursue his vocation and paid for his education. Cardoso also established soup kitchens for the poor. Throughout her work she carried a bag with her most times that contained rosaries and devotional medals that she would hand out to others; she also carried items of clothing with her for the poorer people whom she came across.

In 1925 she enrolled in the League of Servants of Jesus that Bishop João de Oliveira Matos Ferreira founded. In 1926 she undertook a pilgrimage to France to visit the Marian shrine at Lourdes and Lisieux. In 1939 Manuel Gonçalves Cerejeira, the Cardinal Patriarch of Lisbon encouraged her to collaborate with the members of the Catholic Action movement.

In 1948 doctors diagnosed her as having a stomach tumor. Throughout 1949 she became worn and thin from a disease she was diagnosed with that summer; she once tried to climb a set of stairs but found that she lacked the strength to do so. Cardoso underwent a painful operation on 21 January 1950 in order to treat her condition but realized that she did not have much time left with which to live. Cardoso died during the morning on 2 November 1950 and her funeral was celebrated the following morning. In late 1951 the Cardinal Patriarch of Lisbon Manuel Gonçalves Cerejeira dedicated a statue in her honor. Her remains were exhumed and moved to a small chapel on 3 April 2016.

== Beatification process ==
In the Porto diocese its bishop António Ferreira Gomes in 1977 ordered the establishment of a commission in order to explore whether or not a beatification process for Cardoso should be established; this commission helped set the groundwork and basis for the process in their initial investigation into the life and reputation for holiness of Cardoso. The cause commenced on 9 April 1984 after the Congregation for the Causes of Saints issued the nihil obstat ("no objections"), therefore giving their assent to the cause and titling Cardoso as a Servant of God. Archbishop Júlio Tavares Rebimbas inaugurated the diocesan investigation on 6 June 1984 and closed it a decade later on 23 June 1992. The evidence collected during this process was sent to the Congregation where it validated the process on 22 October 1993 as having complied with their guidelines for conducting diocesan processes.

The postulator submitted the positio dossier to the Congregation in 2001 for additional investigation. Cardoso became titled as venerable on 27 March 2013 after Pope Francis signed a decree that acknowledged that Cardoso had practiced heroic virtue during her lifetime to a favorable degree. The postulator for this cause is Arnaldo Pinto Cardoso and the vice-postulator is Ângelo Alves.
