= Roman Catholic Diocese of Elvas =

Former Roman Catholic diocese in Portugal

The Roman Catholic Diocese of Elvas was a Latin diocese in Portugal, located in the city Elvas, district of Portalegre in the Alentejo region and in the ecclesiastical province of Évora.

== History ==
- Erected on 9 June 1570 as Diocese of Elvas / Dioecesis Elvensis on canonical territory split off from Metropolitan the Archdiocese of Évora, apparently as its suffragan.)
- 1818 September 30: Suppressed, its territory being reassigned part back its Metropolitan of Evora, part to Diocese of Portalegre)

Since 1969, the title of Titular Bishop of Elvas continues to be used by auxiliary bishops, in the same manner as is the case with other historical, now-extinct dioceses in Portugal.

== Episcopal ordinaries ==
(all Roman Rite)

Suffragan Bishops of Elvas

- António Mendes de Carvalho (1571 – death 1591.01.09)
- António de Matos de Noronha (20 Nov 1591 – death 16 Nov 1610)
- Rui Pires da Veiga (22 Oct 1612 – death 7 March 1616), also Bishop of Leiria (Portugal) (1615 – resigned 1615)
- Lourenço de Távora, Capuchin Friars Minor (O.F.M. Cap.) (18 Sep 1617 – 1625 Resigned), previously Bishop of Funchal (Madeira, Portugal) (1609.10.24 – 1617.09.18)
- Sebastião de Matos de Noronha (16 March 1626 – 9 June 1636) next Metropolitan Archbishop of Braga (Portugal) (1636.06.09 – death 1641)
- Manuel da Cunha (14 June 1638 – death 30 Nov 1658)
- João de Melo (1 July 1671 – 17 July 1673), next Bishop of Viseu (Portugal) (1673 – 1684.04.24), Bishop of Coimbra (Portugal) (1684.04.24 – death 1704.06.28)
- Alexandre da Silva Botelho (18 Dec 1673 – death 3 Feb 1681)
- Valerio de São Raimundo, Order of Preachers (O.P.) (11 Jan 1683 – death 29 July 1689)
- Jerónimo Soares (6 March 1690 – 30 Aug 1694), next Bishop of Viseu (1694.08.30 – death 1720)
- Bento de Beja Noronha (11 Oct 1694 – death 30 Nov 1700)
- António Pereira da Silva (8 Aug 1701 – 15 Sep 1704), next Bishop of Faro (1704.09.15 – death 1715.04.17)
- Nuno da Cunha e Ataíde (1705 – resigned 1705), later Titular Bishop of Targa (1705.12.14 – 1712.05.18), created Cardinal-Priest of S. Anastasia (1721.06.16 – death 1750.12.03)
- Pedro de Lencastre, Cistercian Order (O. Cist.) (25 Jan 1706 – death 27 Sep 1713)
- Fernando de Faro (7 May 1714 – death 14 Oct 1714)
- João de Sousa de Castelo-Branco (13 Jan 1716 – death 17 March 1728)
- Diego Col, Oratory of Filip Neri (C.O.) (1740.12.19 – ?)
- Pedro de Villas Boas e Sampaio (26 Nov 1742 – death 14 June 1743)
- Baltazar de Faria Villas-Boas (29 July 1743 – death 30 July 1757)
- Lourenço de Lencastre (28 May 1759 – 18 Sep 1780), next Bishop of Leiria (Portugal) (1780.09.18 – death 1790.03.04)
- João Teixeira de Carvalho (18 Sep 1780 – 22 April 1792 Died)
- Diego de Jesus Jardim, Hieronymites (O.S.H.) (21 Feb 1794 – death 30 May 1796), previously Bishop of Olinda (Brazil) (1785.02.14 – 1794.02.21)
- José da Costa e Torres (22 June 1796 – 26 August 1806), next metropolitan Archbishop of Braga (1806 – 1813); previously Bishop of Funchal (Madeira, Portugal) (1785.02.14 – 1796.06.22)
- José Joaquim da Cunha de Azeredo Coutinho (6 Oct 1806 – death 20 May 1820), previously Bishop of Olinda (Brazil) (1794.09.12 – 1806.10.06)
- Joaquim de Meneses e Ataide, Augustinians (O.E.S.A.) (29 May 1820 – death 5 Nov 1828), previously Bishop of São Tomé de Meliapor (India) (1804.10.29 – 1820.05.29)
- Ângelo de Nossa Senhora da Boa-Morte, Order of Friars Minor (O.F.M.) (17 Dec 1832 – death 27 July 1852).

== Titular see ==
In 1969 the diocese was nominally restored as Titular See of Elvas.

It has had the following incumbents, so far of the fitting Episcopal (lowest) rank :

- André Jacquemin (1969.12.10 – resigned 1970.12.10) as emeritate, died 1975; previously Titular Bishop of Cartennae (1951.12.20 – 1954.10.29) as Coadjutor Bishop of Bayeux (France) (1951.12.20 – 1954.10.29), succeeding as Bishop of Bayeux (1954.10.29 – retired 1969.12.10)
- Raymond-Joseph-Louis Bouchex (1972.02.23 – 1978.04.25) as Auxiliary Bishop of Archdiocese of Aix (France) (1972.02.23 – 1978.04.25); next Metropolitan Archbishop of Avignon (France) (1978.04.25 – 2002.06.21); died 2010
- Armindo Lopes Coelho (1978.11.16 – 1982.10.15); next Bishop of Viana do Castelo
- José Augusto Martins Fernandes Pedreira (1982.12.28 – 1997.10.29); next Bishop of Viana do Castelo
- Tomás Pedro Barbosa da Silva Nunes (1998.03.07 – Died 2010.09.01)
- Nuno Brás da Silva Martins (2011.10.10 – 2019.01.12); next Bishop of Funchal
- Darley José Kummer (2019.04.10 - present).

== See also ==
- List of Catholic dioceses in Portugal
- Catholic Church in Portugal
- Roman Catholicism in Portugal

== Sources and external links ==
- GCatolic
