= José Augusto Martins Fernandes Pedreira =

Portuguese bishop (1935–2020)

- Bishop of Viana do Castelo
- Church: Catholic Church
- Diocese: Diocese of Viana do Castelo
- In office: 29 October 1997 – 11 June 2010
- Predecessor: Armindo Lopes Coelho
- Successor: Anacleto de Oliveira
- Previous posts: Titular Bishop of Elvas (1982-1997); Auxiliary Bishop of Porto (1982-1997)

Orders
- Ordination: 12 July 1959
- Consecration: 19 March 1983 by Armindo Lopes Coelho

Personal details
- Born: 10 April 1935 Gondomil (east of Valença), Viana do Castelo District, Portugal
- Died: 14 October 2020 (aged 85) Braga, Braga District, Portugal

José Augusto Martins Fernandes Pedreira (10 April 1935 – 14 October 2020) was a Portuguese Roman Catholic bishop.

Martins Fernandes Pedreira was born in Portugal and was ordained to the priesthood in 1959. He served as titular bishop of Elvas and as auxiliary bishop of the Roman Catholic Diocese of Porto, Portugal from 1982 to 1997 and as bishop of the Roman Catholic Diocese of Viana do Castelo, Portugal from 1997 to 2010.

== Life ==
José Augusto Martins Fernandes Pedreira entered the seminary in Braga in October 1947 and, after completing his theological studies, was ordained a priest on 12 July 1959. He taught at the seminary in Braga and from 1975 to 1979 served as director and professor at several institutions for the training of primary school teachers, educators, and nurses. From 1978 to 1983, he was chancellor of the diocesan curia and in 1982, he served as ecclesiastical advocate for the ecclesiastical court.
