= Paços =

Paços may refer to the following places in Portugal:

- Paços (Melgaço), a civil parish in the municipality of Melgaço
- Paços (Sabrosa), a civil parish in the municipality of Sabrosa
- Paços da Serra, a civil parish in the municipality of Gouveia
- Paços de Brandão, a civil parish in the municipality of Santa Maria da Feira
- Paços de Ferreira, a municipality in the district of Porto
- Paços de Gaiolo, a civil parish in the municipality of Marco de Canaveses
- Paços de Vilharigues, a civil parish in the municipality of Vouzela
