= Frazão =

Frazão is a surname. Notable people with the surname include:

- Aline Frazão (born 1988), Angolan singer-songwriter
- Nuno Frazão (born 1971), Portuguese fencer
- Rui Frazão (born 1970), Portuguese fencer

== See also ==
- Frazão Arreigada
