= Paços de Ferreira Municipal Chamber =

Legislative body of Paços de Ferreira

Coordinates: 41.27586°N 8.37606°W

Paços de Ferreira Municipal Chamber Câmara Municipal de Paços de Ferreira
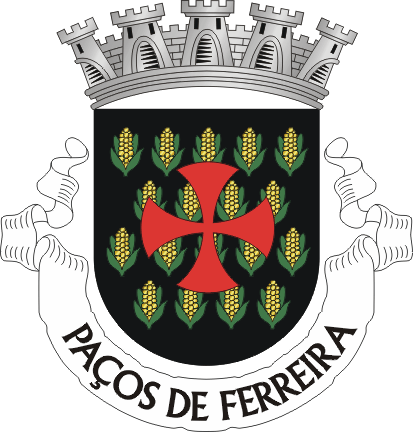
- Coat of arms of the city of Paços de Ferreira

Type
- Type: Câmara municipal
- Term limits: 3

History
- Founded: 6 November 1836; 189 years ago

Leadership
- President: Humberto de Brito, PS since 20 October 2021
- Vice President: Paulo Jorge Rodrigues Ferreira, PS since 20 October 2021

Structure
- Seats: 7
- Political groups: Municipal Executive (4) PS (4) Opposition (3) PSD (3)
- Length of term: Four years

Elections
- Last election: 26 September 2021
- Next election: Sometime between 22 September and 14 October 2025

Meeting place
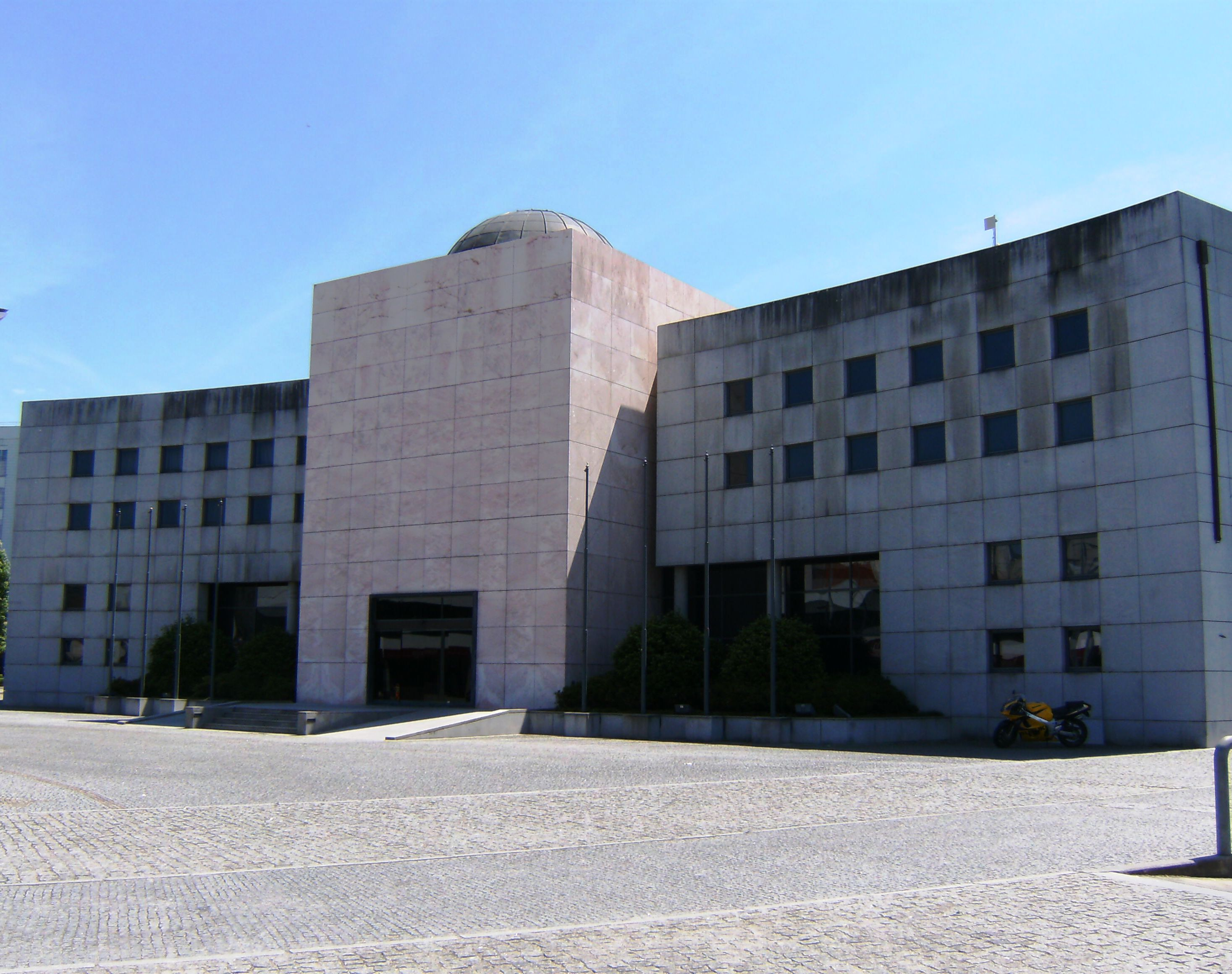
- Paços do Concelho de Paços de Ferreira

Website
- www.cm-pacosdeferreira.pt

The Paços de Ferreira Municipal Chamber (Portuguese: Câmara Municipal de Paços de Ferreira) is the administrative authority in the municipality of Paços de Ferreira. It has 12 freguesias in its area of jurisdiction and is based in the city of Paços de Ferreira, on the Porto District. These freguesias are: Carvalhosa; Eiriz; Ferreira; Figueiró; Frazão Arreigada; Freamunde; Meixomil; Paços de Ferreira; Penamaior; Raimonda; Sanfins Lamoso Codessos and Seroa.

The Paços de Ferreira City Council is made up of 7 councillors, representing, currently, two different political forces. The first candidate on the list with the most votes in a municipal election or, in the event of a vacancy, the next candidate on the list, takes office as President of the Municipal Chamber.

== List of the Presidents of the Municipal Chamber of Paços de Ferreira ==
- Fernando Matos Vasconcelos – (1976–1987)
- Arménio de Assunção Pereira – (1988–2004)
- Pedro Cardoso Pinto – (2004–2013)
- Humberto de Brito – (2013–2025)

(The list is incomplete)
