= Pedro Pitões =

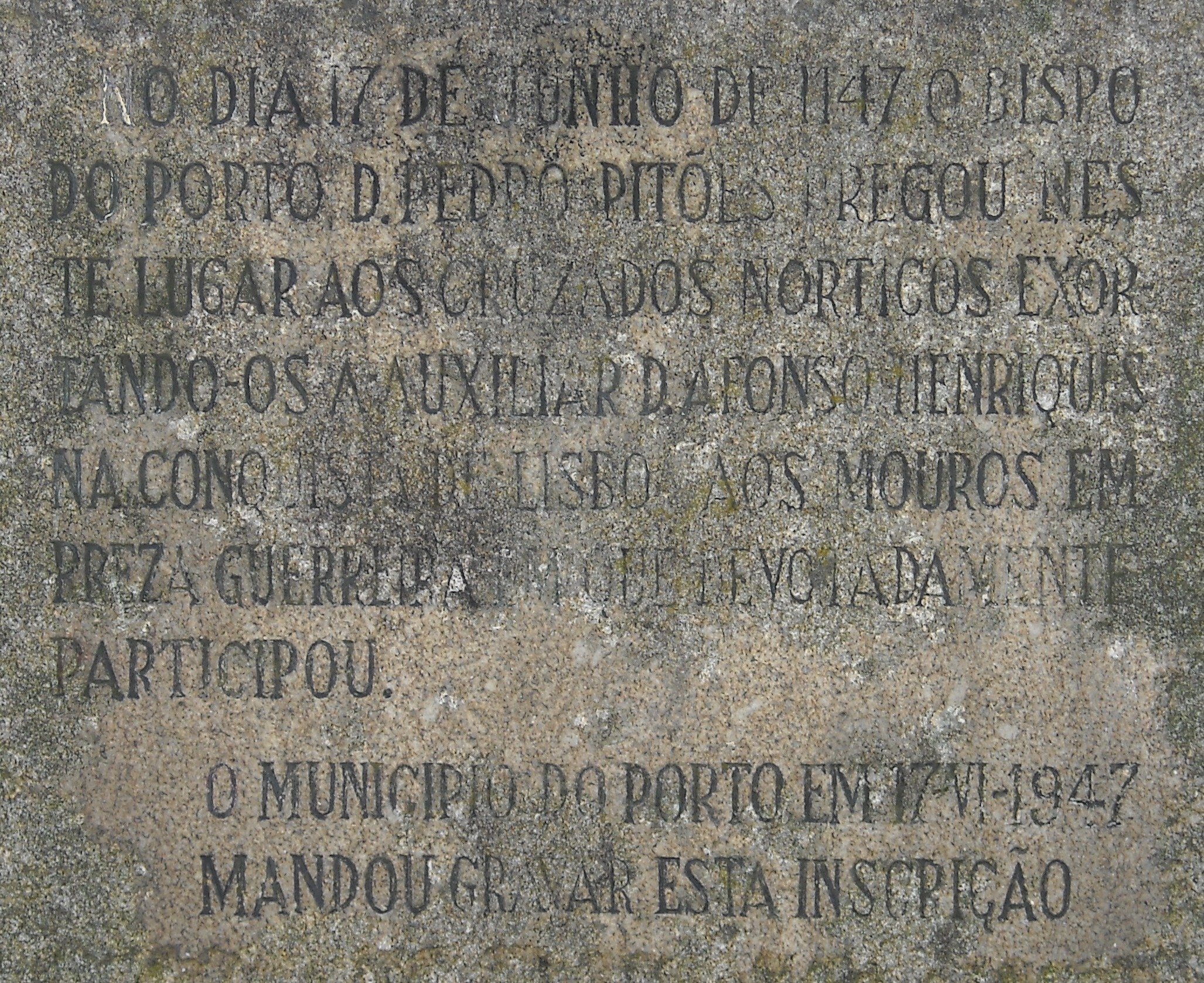

Pedro II Pitões (fl. 1147) was the Bishop of Porto at the time of the Second Crusade. In June 1147, he convinced the Flemish, Frisian, Norman, English, and Scottish crusaders that had landed at Porto to advance to Lisbon with King Afonso I of Portugal.
