= Chaviães e Paços =

- Civil parish
- Location in Portugal
- Coordinates: 42.126°N 8.230°W
- Country: Portugal
- Region: Norte
- Intermunic. comm.: Alto Minho
- District: Viana do Castelo
- Municipality: Melgaço

Area
  - Total: 8.48 km^{2} (3.27 sq mi)

Population (2011)
  - Total: 702
  - Density: 83/km^{2} (210/sq mi)
- Time zone: UTC+00:00 (WET)
  - Summer (DST): UTC+01:00 (WEST)

Chaviães e Paços is a civil parish in the municipality of Melgaço, Portugal. It was formed in 2013 by the merger of the former parishes Chaviães and Paços. The population in 2011 was 702, in an area of 8.48 km^{2}.
