= Fernando da Guerra =

- Archbishop of Braga
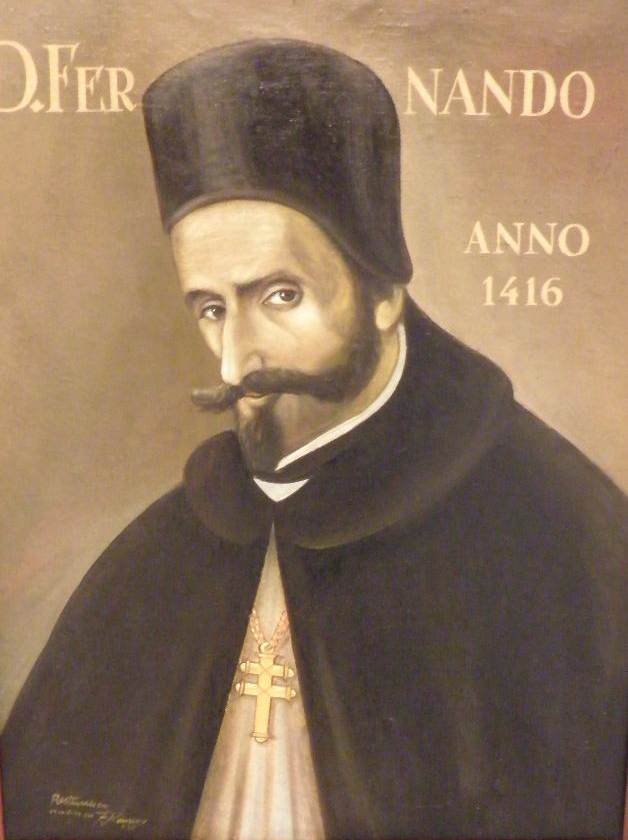
- Church: Catholic Church
- Archdiocese: Archdiocese of Braga
- In office: 15 December 1417 – 26 September 1467
- Predecessor: Martinho Afonso Pires de Miranda
- Successor: Luís Pires
- Previous posts: Bishop of Porto (1414-1417); Bishop of Silves (1409-1414)

Personal details
- Born: c. 1390
- Died: 26 September 1467

Fernando da Guerra (c. 1390 – 26 September 1467) was a Portuguese ecclesiastic. He was successively bishop of Algarve (1409–1414), bishop of Porto (1416–1417) and finally archbishop of Braga (1417–1467). As Archbishop, he was known for his defense of the Church's rights and privileges.

He built the Braga's Archiepiscopal Court, containing the Medieval Hall and library.

== References and notes ==
Preceded by Martinho Gil	Bishop of Algarve; 1409–1414	Succeeded by João Álvaro
Preceded by João Afonso Aranha	Bishop of Porto; 1416–1417	Succeeded by Vasco II
Preceded by Martim Afonso de Miranda	Archbishop of Braga; 1417–1457	Succeeded by Luís Pires
