= Chaviães =

- Civil parish
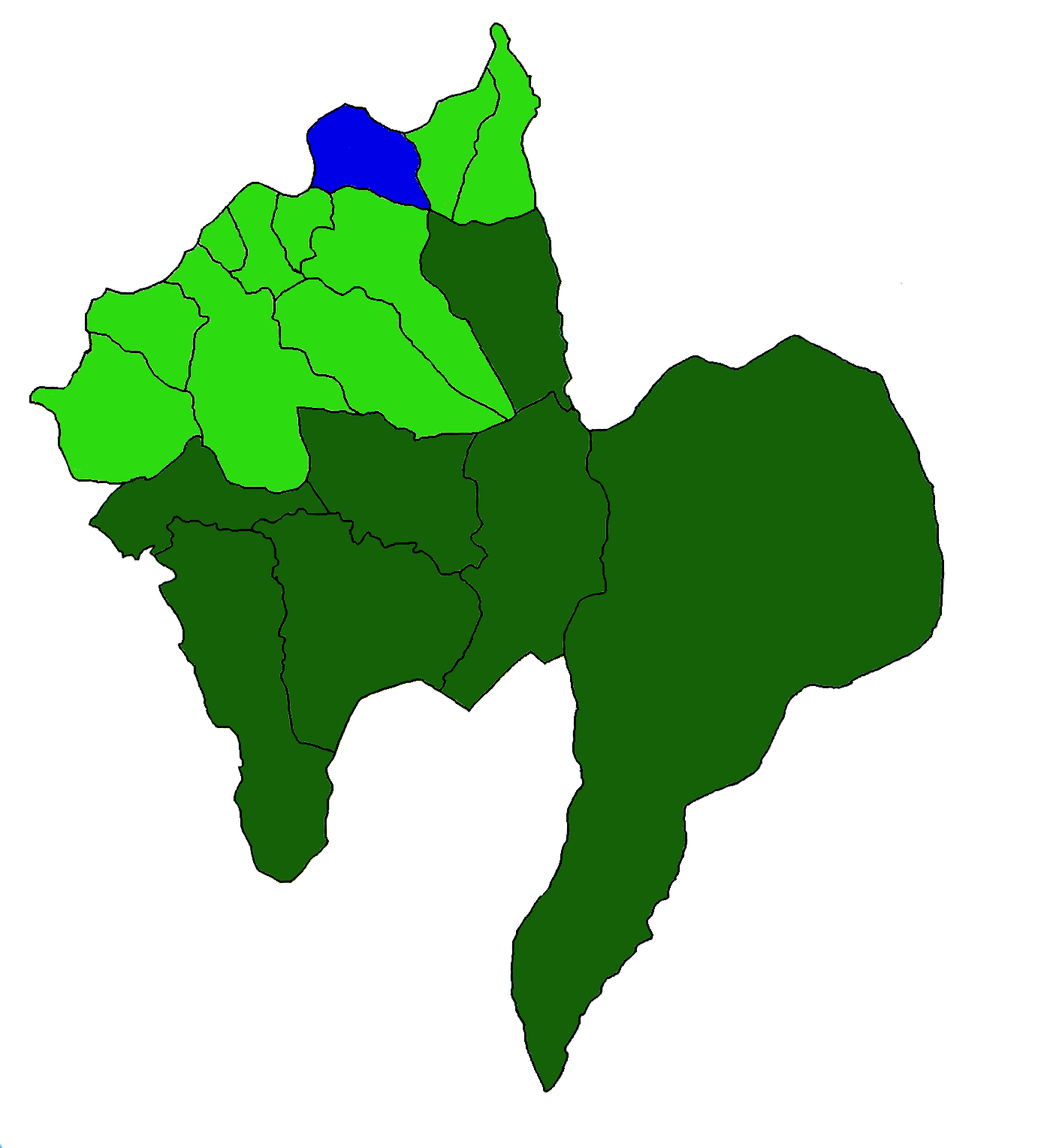
- Coordinates: 42°07′45″N 8°14′31″W
- Country: Portugal
- Region: Norte
- Intermunic. comm.: Alto Minho
- District: Viana do Castelo
- Municipality: Melgaço
- Disbanded: 2013

Area
  - Total: 4.47 km^{2} (1.73 sq mi)

Population
  - Total: 431
  - Density: 96/km^{2} (250/sq mi)
- Time zone: UTC+00:00 (WET)
  - Summer (DST): UTC+01:00 (WEST)

Chaviães is a former civil parish in the municipality of Melgaço in the Viana do Castelo District, Portugal. In 2013, the parish merged into the new parish Chaviães e Paços. It has a population of 431 inhabitants and a total area of 4.47 km^{2}.

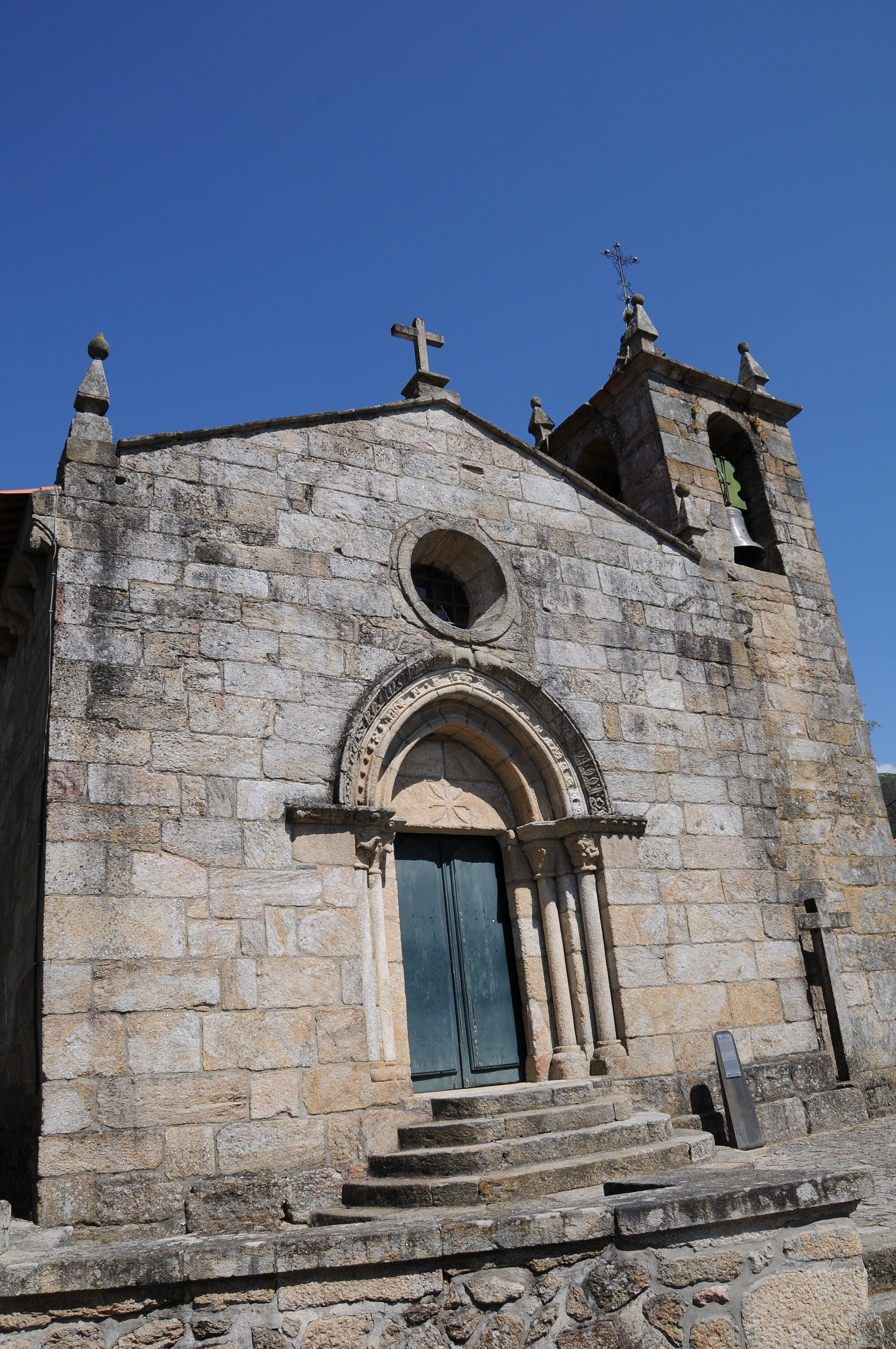
Chaviães Church
