= Pedro Correia (footballer, born 1974) =

Portuguese footballer

Pedro
Personal information
- Full name: Pedro Miguel das Neves Correia
- Date of birth: 22 November 1974 (age 51)
- Place of birth: Paços de Ferreira, Portugal
- Height: 1.80 m (5 ft 11 in)
- Position: Goalkeeper

Youth career
- 1985–1993: Paços Ferreira

Senior career*
Years	Team	Apps	(Gls)
1993–2009	Paços Ferreira	276	(0)
- * Club domestic league appearances and goals

Pedro Miguel das Neves Correia (born 22 November 1974), known simply as Pedro, is a Portuguese former footballer who played as a goalkeeper.

He played solely for Paços de Ferreira in his professional career.

== Club career ==
Pedro was born in Paços de Ferreira. Joining hometown's F.C. Paços de Ferreira when he was just 10 years old, he was given his Primeira Liga debut by coach José Mota in a 1993 match against S.C. Salgueiros, and went on to make 325 competitive appearances for the club.

In 2002–03, as a starter, Pedro helped Paços to achieve a sixth place in the league, a feat repeated in the 2006–07 season, this time good enough for qualification for the UEFA Cup, although he was a backup during the latter campaign.

Pedro retired from football in June 2009 aged 34, but stayed connected with his only professional club, working as goalkeeper coach under several managers.

== See also ==
- List of one-club men
