= Carlos Carneiro (footballer) =

Portuguese footballer and sporting director

Personal information
- Full name: Carlos Paulo Martins Carneiro
- Date of birth: 27 December 1975 (age 50)
- Place of birth: Paços de Ferreira, Portugal
- Height: 1.85 m (6 ft 1 in)
- Position: Striker

Youth career
- 1988–1994: Paços Ferreira

Senior career*
Years	Team	Apps	(Gls)
1994–1997	Paços Ferreira	64	(8)
1994–1995	→ Lousada (loan)	20	(2)
1998–1999	Covilhã	48	(17)
1999–2003	Paços Ferreira	107	(15)
2003–2004	Vitória Guimarães	22	(0)
2005–2006	Gil Vicente	48	(11)
2006–2007	Panionios	11	(1)
2007	Walsall	3	(0)
2008–2009	Paços Ferreira	24	(2)
2009	Vizela	9	(2)
2010	Penafiel	11	(1)
Total		367	(59)
- * Club domestic league appearances and goals

Carlos Paulo Martins Carneiro (born 27 December 1975) is a Portuguese former professional footballer who played as a striker.

He played mostly for Paços de Ferreira during his 16-year senior career, amassing Primeira Liga totals of 172 matches and 24 goals over eight seasons and also representing in competition Vitória de Guimarães and Gil Vicente.

== Playing career ==
During his early career, Paços de Ferreira-born Carneiro played for F.C. Paços de Ferreira (he would represent his boyhood club on three separate stints) and S.C. Covilhã, the latter in the third division. In summer 2003, following his second spell at Paços, he signed with Vitória de Guimarães, moving in January 2005 to fellow Primeira Liga team Gil Vicente FC.

Carneiro spent the 2006–07 season in Greece with Panionios FC, and began the following in England at Football League One side Walsall, signing on 17 July 2007 subject to international clearance. However, he had his contract terminated at the latter on 5 November, rejoining his first professional club in January 2008.

After an additional one and a half years at Paços, being irregularly used and almost always as a late substitute, the 33-year-old Carneiro left for F.C. Vizela in the third tier. In January 2010, he joined F.C. Penafiel of the second.

== Management career ==
In May 2010, after helping his last team to easily retain their status, Carneiro retired from football and rejoined main club Paços Ferreira as its director of football. Six years later, in the same capacity, he signed with C.D. Tondela.

On 20 May 2019, Carneiro returned to Paços still as a sporting director.
