= Armindo Lopes Coelho =

- Bishop of Porto
- Church: Catholic Church
- Diocese: Diocese of Porto
- In office: 13 June 1997 – 22 February 2007
- Predecessor: Júlio Tavares Rebimbas
- Successor: Manuel Clemente
- Previous posts: Bishop of Viana do Castelo (1982-1997); Titular Bishop of Elvas (1978-1982); Auxiliary Bishop of Porto (1978-1982)

Orders
- Ordination: 1 August 1954
- Consecration: 25 March 1979 by António Ferreira Gomes

Personal details
- Born: 16 February 1931 Regilde (west of Felgueiras), Douro Province, Portugal
- Died: 29 September 2010 (aged 79)

Armindo Lopes Coelho (16 December 1931 – 29 September 2010) was the Roman Catholic bishop of the Roman Catholic Diocese of Porto, Portugal.

Ordained to the priesthood on 1 August 1954, Lopes Coelho was appointed auxiliary bishop of the Porto Diocese on 16 November 1978 and was consecrated on 25 March 1978. On 13 June 1997 he was appointed diocesan bishop of the Porto Diocese, retiring on 22 February 2007.
