= Tomás Pedro Barbosa da Silva Nunes =

Portuguese bishop (1942–2010)

Tomás Pedro Barbosa da Silva Nunes (December 3, 1942 – September 1, 2010) was the Portuguese Auxiliary bishop of the Patriarch of Lisbon from his appointment on March 7, 1998, until his death on September 1, 2010. He also served as the Titular bishop of the Diocese of Elvas in Portugal.

Tomás Pedro Barbosa da Silva Nunes was born in Lisbon, Portugal on December 3, 1942. He died on September 1, 2010, at the age of 67.
