= Paços de Ferreira =

- Municipality
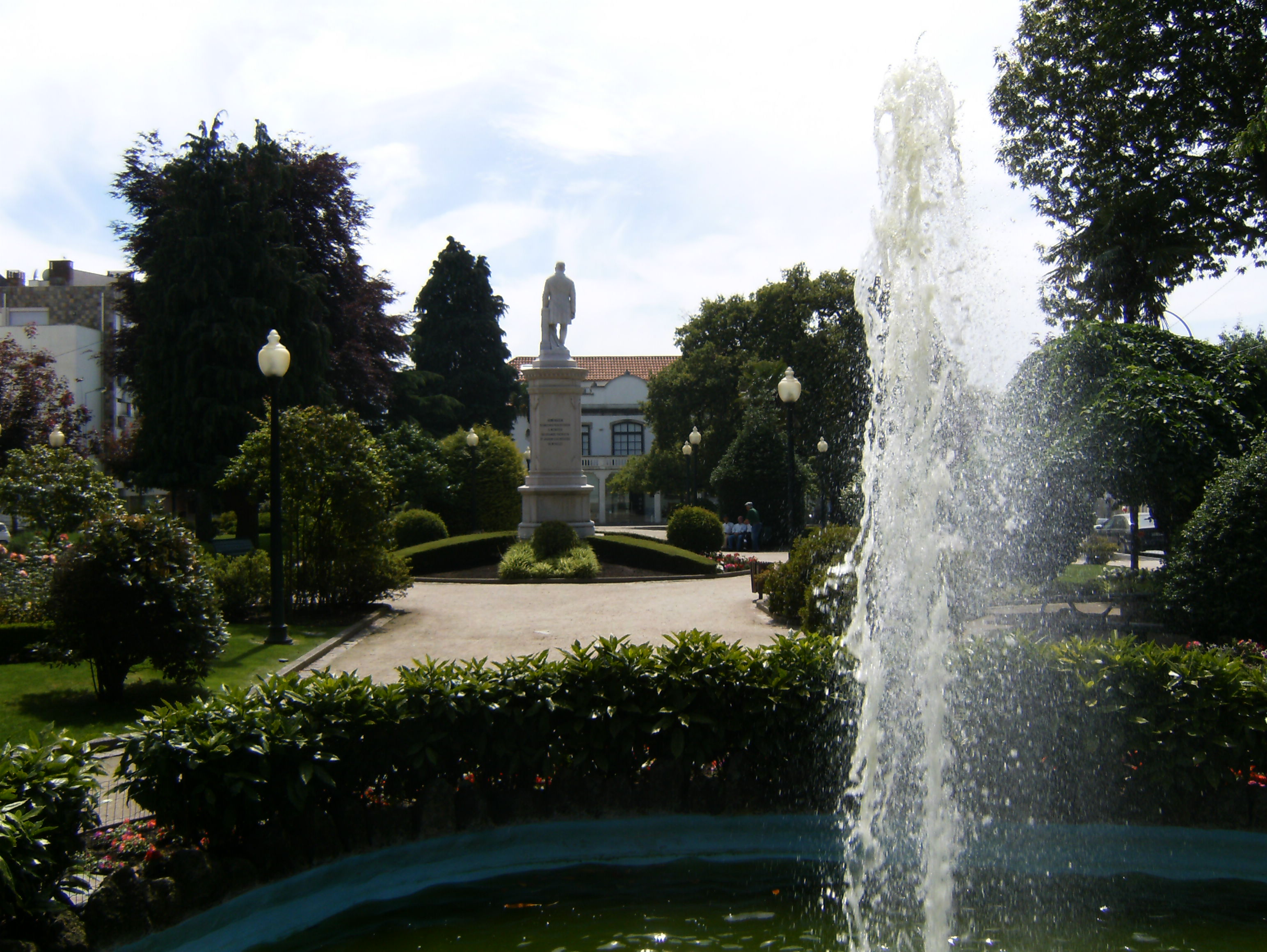
- The civic gardens of Paços de Ferreira

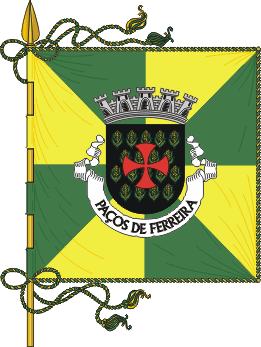
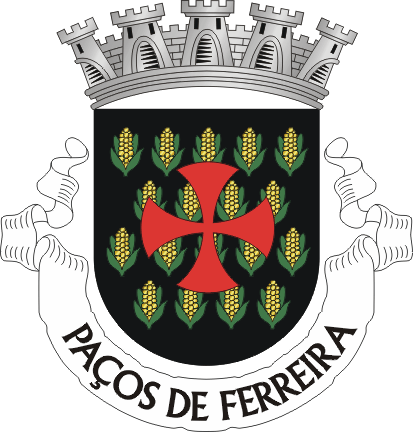
- Flag Coat of arms
- Interactive map of Paços de Ferreira
- Coordinates: 41°16′N 8°24′W
- Country: Portugal
- Region: Norte
- Intermunic. comm.: Tâmega e Sousa
- District: Porto
- Seat: Paços de Ferreira Municipal Chamber
- Parishes: 12

Area
  - Total: 70.99 km^{2} (27.41 sq mi)

Population (2011)
  - Total: 56,340
  - Density: 793.6/km^{2} (2,055/sq mi)
- Time zone: UTC+00:00 (WET)
  - Summer (DST): UTC+01:00 (WEST)
- Website: www.cm-pacosdeferreira.pt

Paços de Ferreira (European Portuguese pronunciation: [ˈpasuʒ ðɨ fɨˈʁɐjɾɐ]) is a city in the Porto District, in the north of Portugal. The population of the city in 2011 was 7491, while its municipality had 56,340 inhabitants, in an area of 70.99 km².

Sometimes referred to as the Capital do Móvel (capital of furniture), owing to the predominance of this industry within its territory, the municipality has around 5000 companies producing furniture and has the biggest exhibition and selling area (estimated in 2.5 square kilometers) of furniture in Europe. It is also the location of IKEA's industrial operations within Portugal.

Its football team, FC Paços de Ferreira, participated for three times in European Competitions (Champions League and Europa League), finished runners-up of the Portuguese cup in 2008–09 and of the Portuguese League Cup in 2010–11.

== History ==
The territory of the current municipality was occupied by humans since prehistory. In the parish of Sanfins de Ferreira, there is an important hillfort, the Citânia de Sanfins, that was one of the main settlements of the Celtic tribes who lived in northwest Iberian Peninsula (Gallaeci). In medieval times, this planaltic area had few population. The only centers of power were the monastery of Ferreira and the noble families concentrated in the parish of Frazão.

After the Portuguese Civil War, the new constitucional regime made important administrative changes, and, for the first time, granted administrative autonomy for the populations of the region, creating a municipality in 1836 and appointing the most central parish of the plateau, Santa Eulália de Paços de Ferreira, as capital.

Since then, the territory registered a remarkable development, and the population more than sextupled in 150 years.

In the beginnings of the 20th century, a local elementary school teacher, Albino de Matos, invented new tools and furniture which began to be used in schools all around the country, marking the beginning of the furniture industry in Paços de Ferreira. In the second half of the century, with the economic growth of the country, the carpenters of Paços de Ferreira started to make and sell furniture for houses, which allowed the industry to expand, becoming the most important activity of the population.

In 1993 the Portuguese parliament gave the title of city to Paços de Ferreira.

== Geography ==
Administratively, the municipality is divided into 12 civil parishes (freguesias):

- Carvalhosa
- Eiriz
- Ferreira
- Figueiró
- Frazão Arreigada
- Freamunde [city]
- Meixomil
- Paços de Ferreira [city]
- Penamaior
- Raimonda
- Sanfins Lamoso Codessos
- Seroa

=== Climate ===
Paços de Ferreira has a warm-summer Mediterranean climate (Csb) with cool, very rainy winters and warm summers that are dry enough to avoid being classified as oceanic (Cfb).

Climate data for Paços de Ferreira, 1955-1980, altitude: 320 m (1,050 ft)
Month	Jan	Feb	Mar	Apr	May	Jun	Jul	Aug	Sep	Oct	Nov	Dec	Year
Record high °C (°F)	20.3 (68.5)	25.8 (78.4)	27.3 (81.1)	29.4 (84.9)	34.9 (94.8)	35.6 (96.1)	39.1 (102.4)	38.3 (100.9)	37.7 (99.9)	32.0 (89.6)	27.0 (80.6)	21.1 (70.0)	39.1 (102.4)
Mean daily maximum °C (°F)	11.9 (53.4)	12.8 (55.0)	14.7 (58.5)	17.0 (62.6)	19.8 (67.6)	23.3 (73.9)	25.9 (78.6)	26.1 (79.0)	24.2 (75.6)	20.3 (68.5)	14.9 (58.8)	12.1 (53.8)	18.6 (65.4)
Daily mean °C (°F)	7.4 (45.3)	8.1 (46.6)	9.7 (49.5)	11.5 (52.7)	14.2 (57.6)	17.4 (63.3)	19.3 (66.7)	19.1 (66.4)	17.7 (63.9)	14.4 (57.9)	9.8 (49.6)	7.4 (45.3)	13.0 (55.4)
Mean daily minimum °C (°F)	2.8 (37.0)	3.4 (38.1)	4.8 (40.6)	6.0 (42.8)	8.7 (47.7)	11.4 (52.5)	12.7 (54.9)	12.0 (53.6)	11.2 (52.2)	8.5 (47.3)	4.6 (40.3)	2.7 (36.9)	7.4 (45.3)
Record low °C (°F)	−6.2 (20.8)	−8.0 (17.6)	−4.1 (24.6)	−3.2 (26.2)	−0.3 (31.5)	1.8 (35.2)	5.2 (41.4)	5.3 (41.5)	1.4 (34.5)	−1.0 (30.2)	−5.0 (23.0)	−7.6 (18.3)	−8.0 (17.6)
Average precipitation mm (inches)	252.7 (9.95)	235.2 (9.26)	209.8 (8.26)	122.3 (4.81)	120.8 (4.76)	68.6 (2.70)	29.2 (1.15)	28.4 (1.12)	81.7 (3.22)	149.5 (5.89)	183.5 (7.22)	227.5 (8.96)	1,709.2 (67.3)
Average precipitation days (≥ 0.1 mm)	14.8	13.5	12.2	13.5	13.4	8.2	5.4	4.7	7.4	12.7	13.1	15.5	134.4
Average relative humidity (%)	88	82.5	79	73.5	70.5	68.5	68	68	74.5	81	85.5	87.5	77.2
Source: Instituto Português do Mar e da Atmosfera

=== Demographics ===
Population of the municipality of Paços de Ferreira (1864–2011)
1864	1878	1890	1900	1911	1920	1930	1940	1950	1960	1970	1981	1991	2001	2011
9 627	10 226	11 361	11 900	13 924	13 864	15 686	18 697	21 999	27 537	33 655	40 687	44 190	52 985	56 340

== Sport ==
- F.C. Paços de Ferreira (Football)
- S.C. Freamunde

== Notable people ==
- Sílvia Cardoso (1882–1950) a beatified Portuguese Roman Catholic apostolate for the poor in Brazil, she also funded a boarding school for girls and supported a hospital

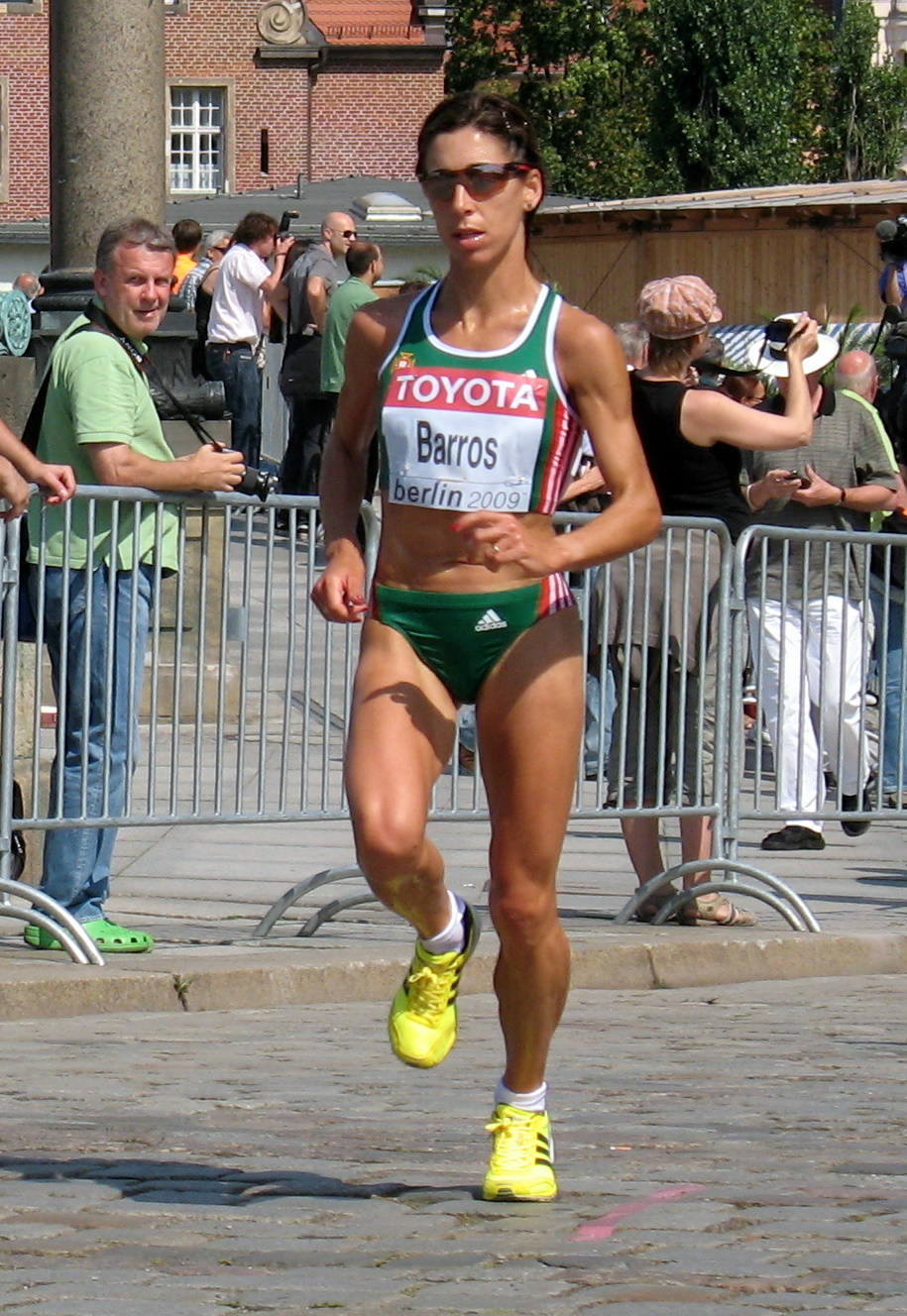
Marisa Barros, 2009

=== Sport ===
- Carlos Pinto (born 1973) a Portuguese former footballer with 378 club caps
- Pedro Correia (born 1974), known as Pedro, a former football goalkeeper with 276 club caps
- Joaquim Agostinho da Silva Ribeiro (born 1975), known as Agostinho, a retired footballer with 379 club caps
- Carlos Carneiro (born 1975) a Portuguese former footballer with 367 club caps
- Marisa Barros (born 1980), a Portuguese marathon runner, competed at the 2008 & 2012 Summer Olympics
- Ricardo Manuel Ferreira Sousa (born 1981), known as Cadú, a footballer with over 480 club caps
- André Leão (born 1985) a Portuguese professional footballer with over 360 club caps
- Luís Pedro (born 1989), a Portuguese footballer with over 350 club caps

== Gallery ==
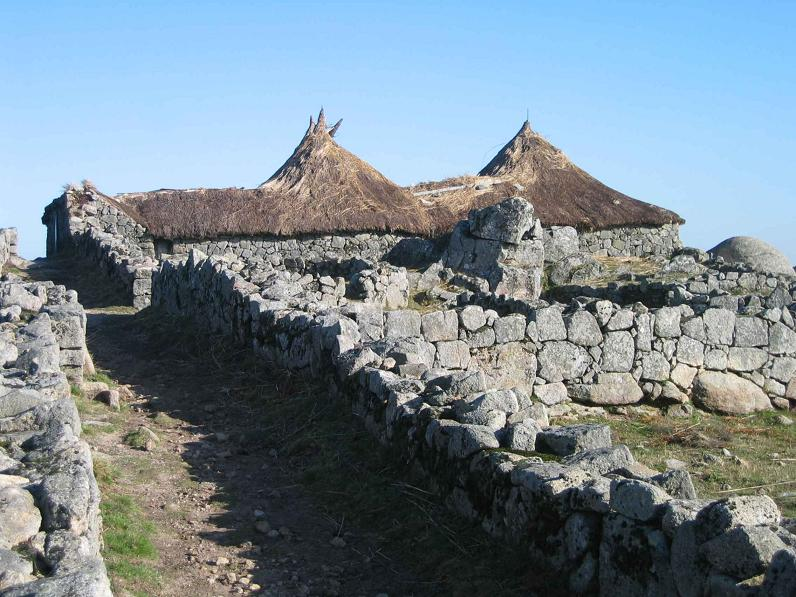
The Citânia de Sanfins hillfort

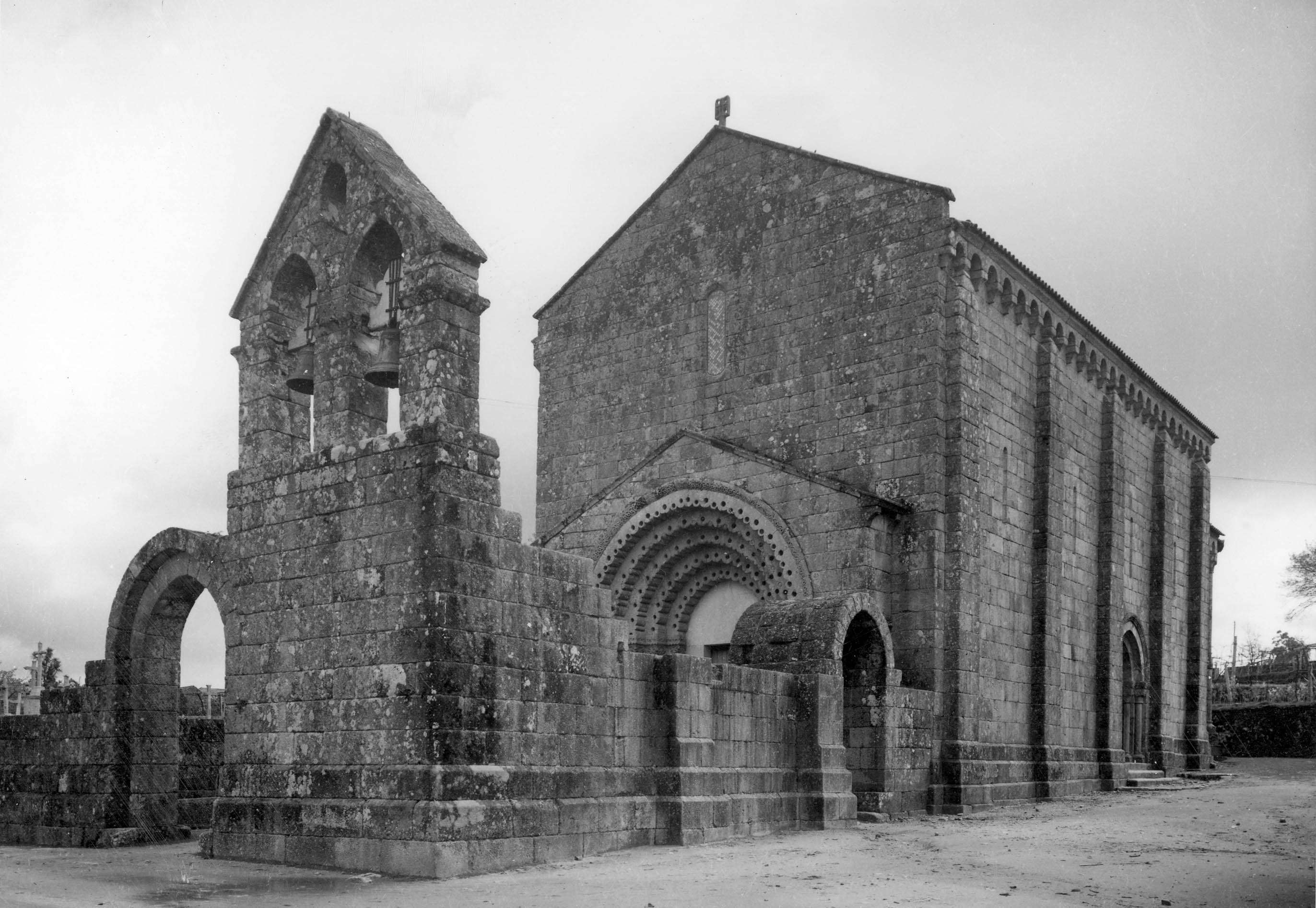
The monastery of Ferreira

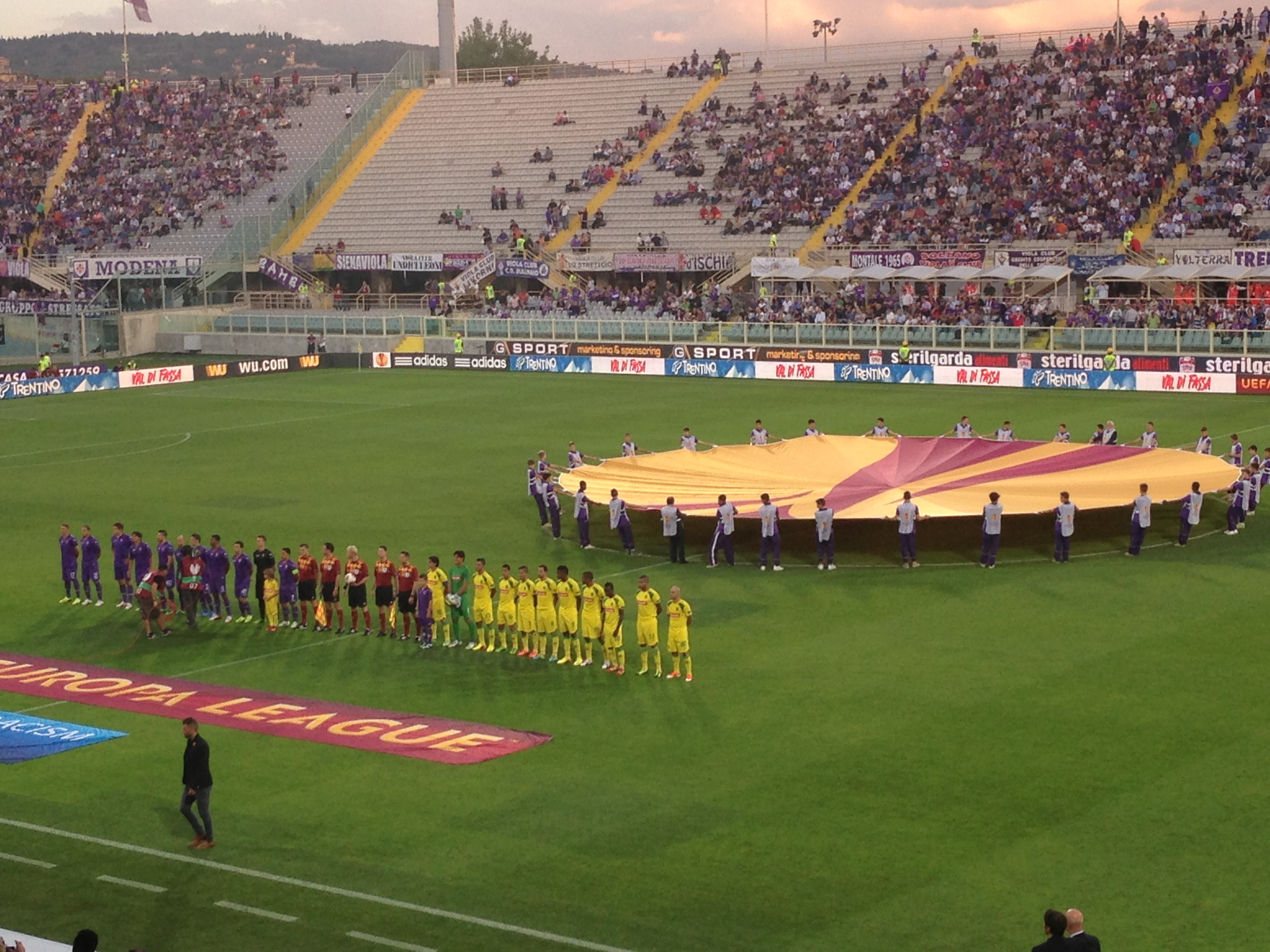
FC Paços de Ferreira playing a UEFA Europa League match
