= Paços (Melgaço) =

- Civil parish
- Coat of arms

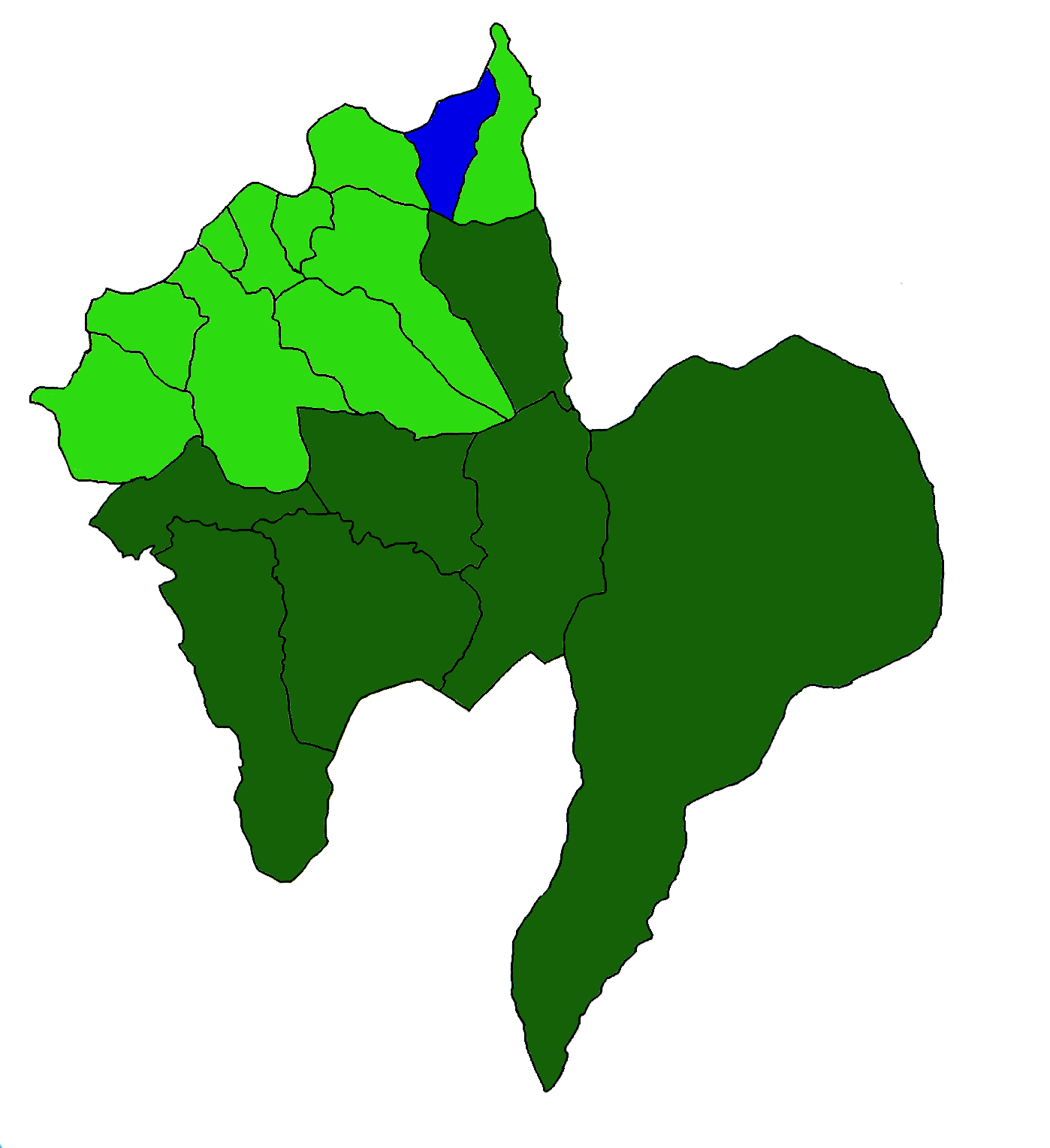
- Coordinates: 42°07′14″N 8°13′02″W
- Country: Portugal
- Region: Norte
- Intermunic. comm.: Alto Minho
- District: Viana do Castelo
- Municipality: Melgaço
- Disbanded: 2013

Area
  - Total: 4.8 km^{2} (1.9 sq mi)

Population
  - Total: 379
  - Density: 79/km^{2} (200/sq mi)
- Time zone: UTC+00:00 (WET)
  - Summer (DST): UTC+01:00 (WEST)

Paços is a former civil parish in the municipality of Melgaço in the Viana do Castelo District, Portugal. In 2013, the parish merged into the new parish Chaviães e Paços. It has a population of 379 inhabitants and a total area of 4.8 km^{2}.

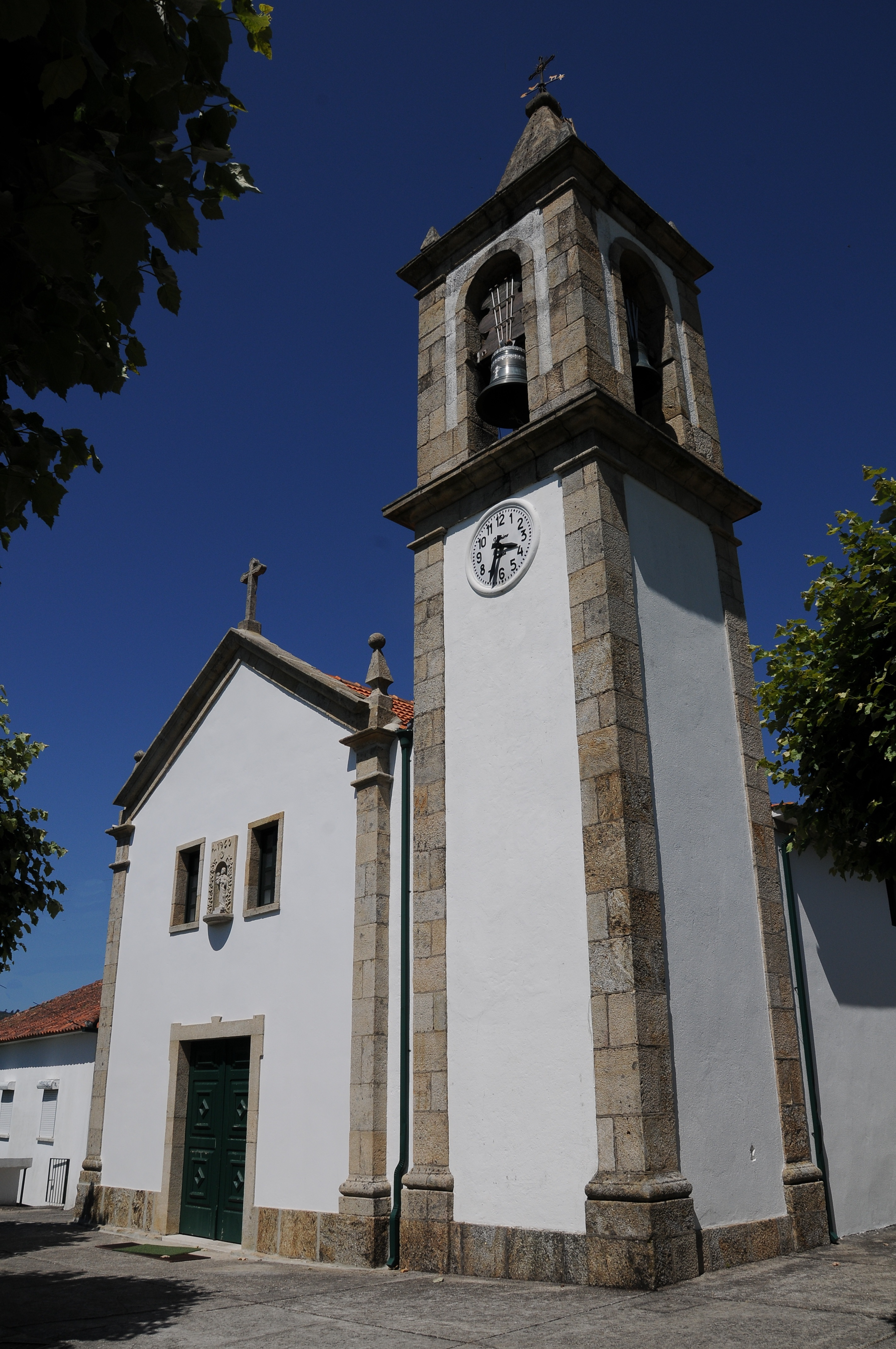
Paços Church
