= Diocese of Viana do Castelo =

Diocese of the Catholic Church in Portugal

Diocese of Viana do Castelo Dioecesis Vianensis Castelli Diocese de Viana do Castelo

Catholic
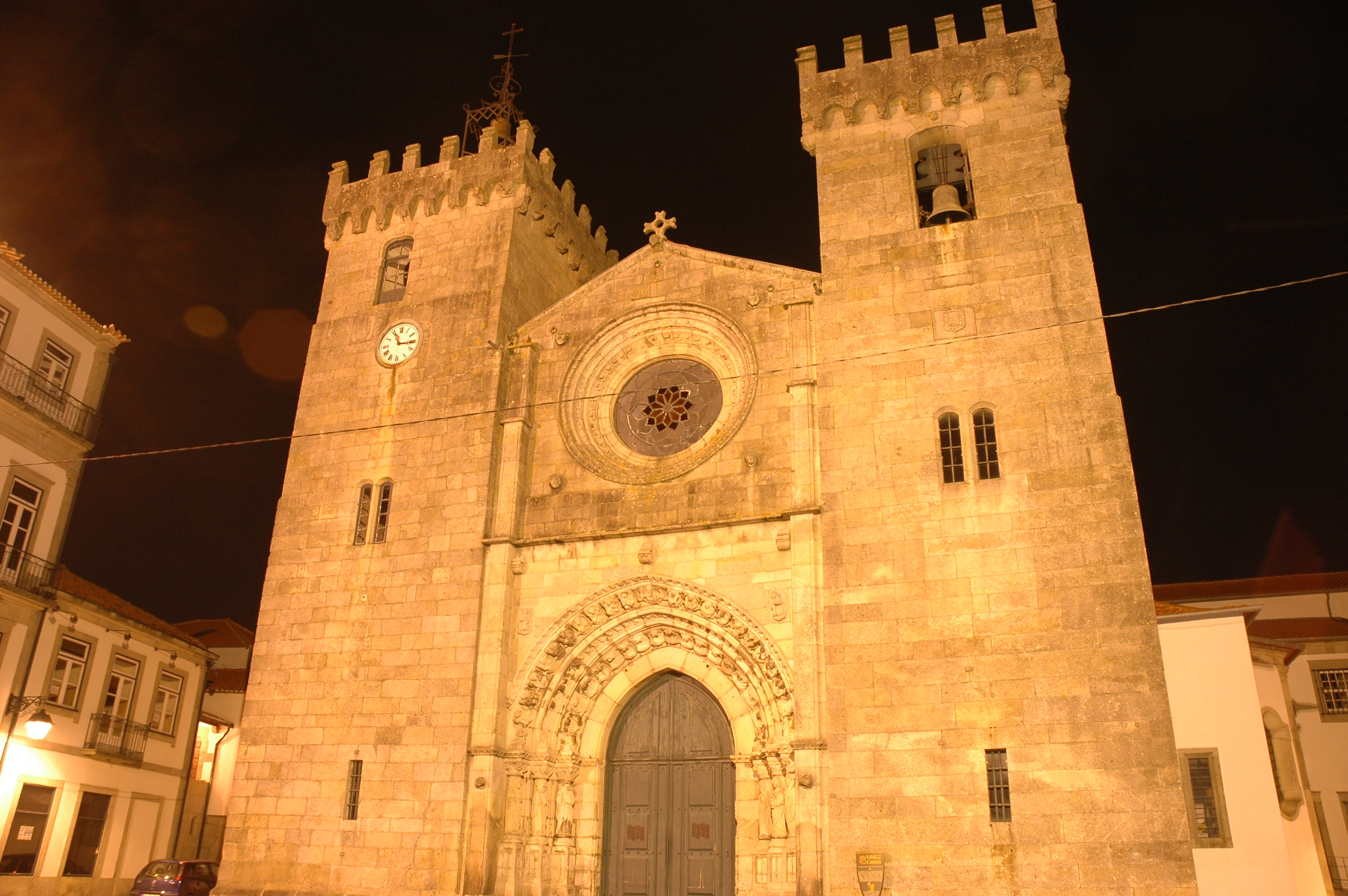
- The Cathedral of St Mary Major in Viana do Castelo

Location
- Country: Portugal
- Metropolitan: Archdiocese of Braga
- Headquarters: Viana do Castelo, Viana do Castelo District, Portugal

Statistics
- Area: 2,255 km^{2} (871 sq mi)
- Population: Total; Catholics: (as of 2022); 231,488; 211,000 (91.1%)

Information
- Denomination: Catholic Church
- Sui iuris church: Latin Church
- Rite: Roman Rite
- Established: 3 November 1977; 49 years ago
- Cathedral: The Cathedral of St Mary Major in Viana do Castelo
- Patron saint: Assumption of Mary
- Secular priests: 143 (134 Diocesan, 9 Religious Orders)

Current leadership
- Pope: Leo XIV
- Bishop: João Evangelista Pimentel Lavrador
- Metropolitan Archbishop: José Cordeiro

Map
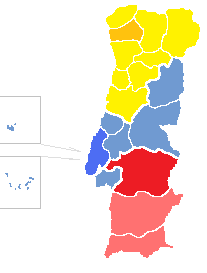

Website
- Website of the Diocese

The Diocese of Viana do Castelo (Latin: Dioecesis Vianensis Castelli), is a Latin Church diocese of the Catholic Church in the Norte Region of Portugal. It has existed since 1977. It is a suffragan of the archdiocese of Braga, with its see at Viana do Castelo.

The current bishop is João Evangelista Pimentel Lavrador.

== Leadership ==
=== Bishops of Viana do Castelo ===
- Júlio Tavares Rebimbas (3 November 1977 – 12 February 1982), appointed (Arch)Bishop of Porto
- Armindo Lopes Coelho (15 October 1982 – 13 June 1997), appointed Bishop of Porto
- José Augusto Martins Fernandes Pedreira (29 October 1997 – 11 June 2010), retired
- Anacleto de Oliveira (11 June 2010 – 18 September 2020)
- João Evangelista Pimentel Lavrador (21 September 2021 – Present)
