= Júlio Tavares Rebimbas =

Portuguese Roman Catholic archbishop

- (Arch)Bishop of Porto
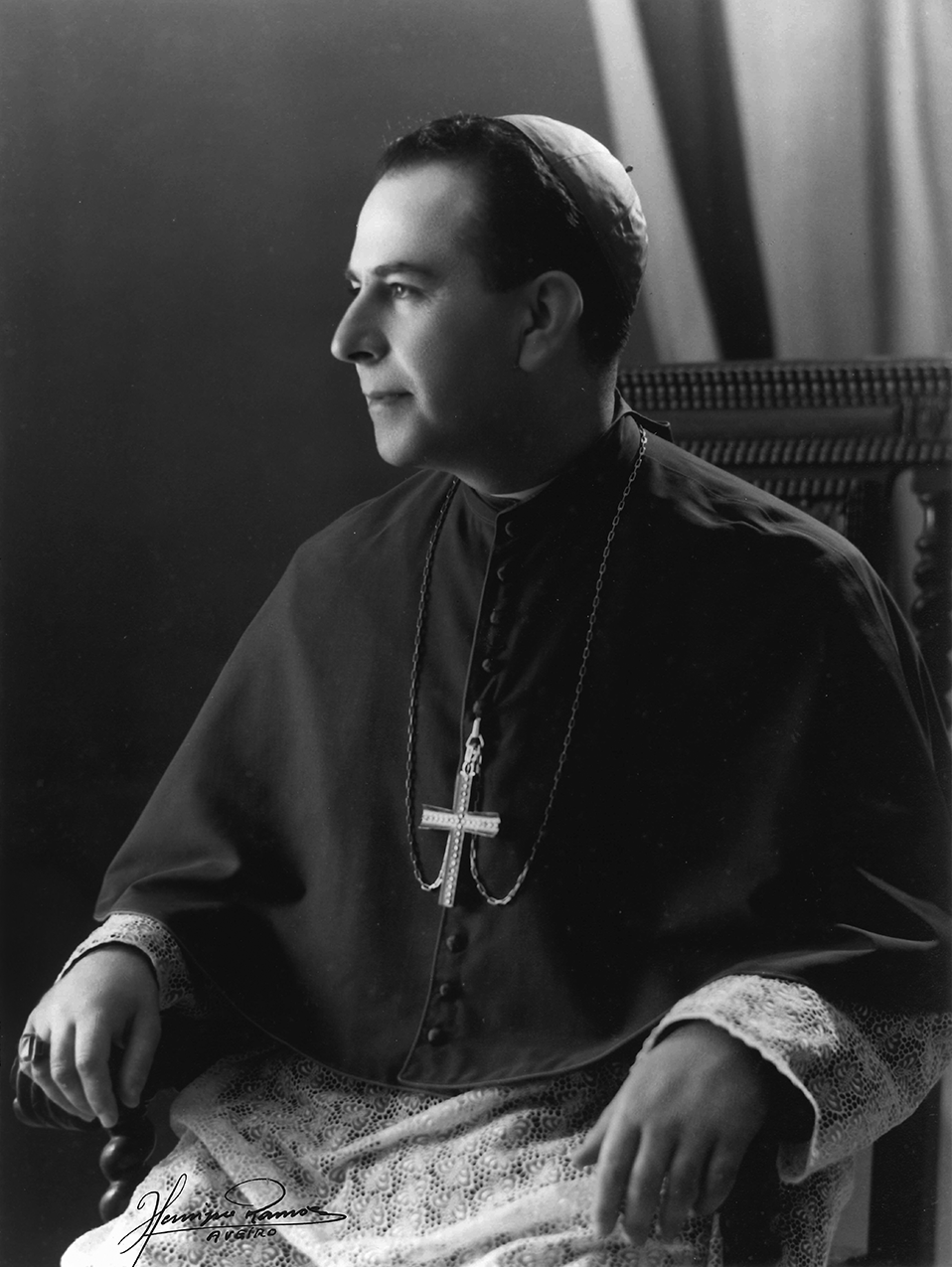
- Júlio Tavares Rebimbas, c. 1960s
- Church: Catholic Church
- Diocese: Diocese of Porto
- In office: 12 February 1982 – 13 June 1997
- Predecessor: António Ferreira Gomes
- Successor: Armindo Lopes Coelho
- Previous posts: (Arch)Bishop of Viana do Castelo (1977-1982); Titular Archbishop of Mytilene (1972-1977); Auxiliary Bishop of Lisbon (1972-1977); Bishop of Faro (1965-1972)

Orders
- Ordination: 29 June 1945
- Consecration: 26 December 1965 by Manuel d'Almeida Trindade

Personal details
- Born: 21 January 1922 Bunheiro, Douro Province, Portugal
- Died: 6 December 2010 (aged 88)

Júlio Tavares Rebimbas (21 June 1922 – 6 December 2010) was the Roman Catholic archbishop (personal title) of the Roman Catholic Diocese of Porto, Portugal.

Ordained to the priesthood in 1945, Tavares Rebimbas was named bishop in 1965 and became bishop of the Porto Diocese in 1982 and retired in 1997.
