= Anacleto de Oliveira =

Portuguese Catholic prelate (1946–2020)

His Most Reverend Excellency D. Anacleto de Oliveira
- Bishop of Viana do Castelo
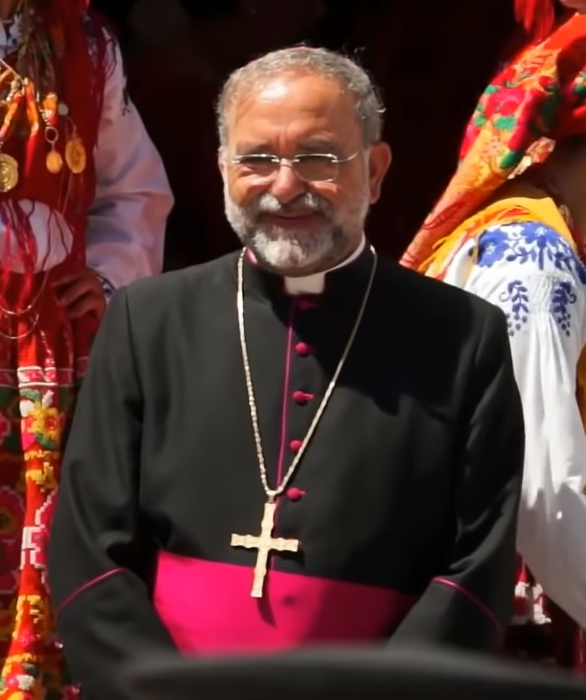
- Church: Roman Catholic Church
- Metropolis: Archdiocese of Braga
- Diocese: Viana do Castelo
- Appointed: 11 June 2010
- Predecessor: José Augusto Pedreira
- Previous post: Auxiliary bishop of Lisbon (2005–2010)

Orders
- Ordination: 15 August 1970
- Consecration: 24 April 2005 by Serafim Ferreira e Silva

Personal details
- Born: 17 July 1946 Cortes, Leiria, Portugal
- Died: 18 September 2020 (aged 74) Almodôvar, Portugal
- Denomination: Roman Catholic
- Motto: "Escravo de Todos"

Anacleto Cordeiro Gonçalves de Oliveira (17 July 1946 – 18 September 2020) was a Portuguese Roman Catholic bishop.

Gonçalves de Oliveira was born in Portugal and was ordained to the priesthood in 1970. He served as auxiliary bishop of the Roman Catholic Archdiocese of Lisbon, Portugal, from 2005 to 2010. He then served as bishop of the Roman Catholic Diocese of Viana do Castelo, Portugal, from 2010 until his death in 2020 in a traffic accident.
