= Diocese of Porto, Portugal =

Diocese of the Catholic Church in Portugal

Diocese of Porto Dioecesis Portugallensis Diocese do Porto

Catholic
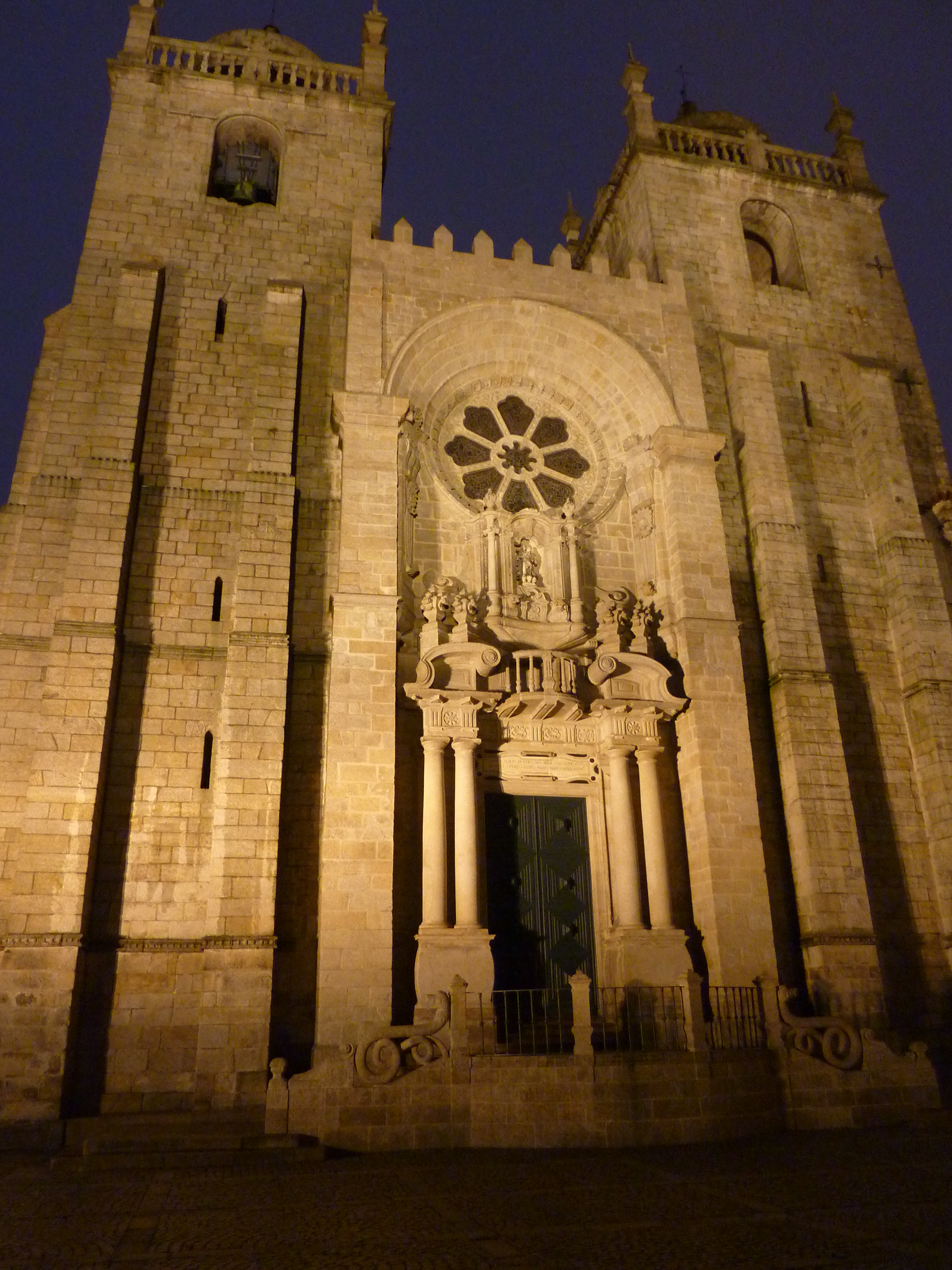
- Porto Cathedral

Location
- Country: Portugal
- Ecclesiastical province: Braga
- Metropolitan: Archdiocese of Braga

Statistics
- Area: 3,010 km^{2} (1,160 sq mi)
- Population: Total; Catholics: (as of 2016); 2,088,000 (est.); 1,890,000 (est.) (90.5%)
- Parishes: 477

Information
- Denomination: Roman Catholic
- Sui iuris church: Latin Church
- Rite: Roman Rite
- Established: 588
- Cathedral: Cathedral of the Assumption of Our Lady in Porto
- Patron saint: Assumption of Mary
- Secular priests: 286 (diocesan); 179 (Religious Orders); 93 Permanent Deacons

Current leadership
- Pope: Leo XIV
- Bishop: Manuel da Silva Rodrigues Linda
- Metropolitan Archbishop: Jorge Ferreira da Costa Ortiga
- Auxiliary Bishops: Pio de Souza; Armando Esteves Domingues; Vitorino Soares
- Bishops emeritus: João Miranda Teixeira Auxiliary Bishop (1983-2011)

Map

Website
- Website of the Diocese

The Diocese of Porto (Latin: Dioecesis Portugallensis) (Oporto) is a Latin Church diocese of the Catholic Church in Portugal. It is a suffragan of the archdiocese of Braga. Its see at Porto is in the Norte region, and the second largest city in Portugal.

== History ==
The diocese was probably founded in the middle of the sixth century. At the third Council of Toledo (589) the Arian bishop Argiovittus, though he condemned the Arian belief and accepted the Catholic belief, was deposed in favour of bishop Constantinus. In 610 Bishop Argebertus assisted at the Council of Toledo, summoned by King Gundemar to sanction the metropolitan claims of Toledo. Bishop Ansiulfus was present at the Sixth Council of Toledo (638), and Bishop Flavius at the Tenth (656).

Bishop Froaricus was one of eight bishops who attended the provincial council of Braga (675), and the Twelfth (681), Thirteenth (683), and Fifteenth (688) Councils of Toledo. His successor Felix appeared at the Sixteenth Council (693). No other bishop is recorded under the Visigothic monarchy.

=== Arab occupation ===
In 716 the Arabs began their invasion and conquest of Portugal, including Lisbon, Porto, Braga, Tuy, Lugo, and Orense. The areas were depopulated. After the Arab invasion Justus seems to have been the first bishop (c. 882). He is only a name. Gomado was probably elected in 872, when King Affonso III won back the city. The names of only four other prelates have been preserved: Froarengus (906), Hermogius (912), Hordonius (attested in 931), and Didacus (Diego) (c. 962?).

Porto fell again into Moorish hands.

=== Restoration ===
On the recovery of Porto for Christianity, which was being promoted by the Burgundian Count Henry, son-in-law of King Alfonso VI of Castile and governor of the lands from the Minho River to the banks of the Tagus, priests and prelates were being imported, especially those with connections to Cluny in Burgundy. Hugo (Hugh) became bishop (1114-1136). He had been a Canon of the Cathedral of Compostella, and under the patronage of Bishop Diego Gelmirez, a Cluniac, he was said to have been a co-author of the Historia Compostellana. In 1103-1104 he was sent to Rome on an embassy for the Church of Compostella, and obtained a bull granting numerous privileges, one of which was the right of the Bishop of Compostella to name Cardinals of Compostella. Hugo became a Cardinal. In 1109 he was Archdeacon of Compostella, but at the time of his election to the diocese of Porto and not yet ordained. He was ordained a priest on the day before Passion Sunday, and was consecrated a bishop on 23 March 1113 by Archbishop Mauricio Burdino of Braga, another Cluniac. As Bishop of Porto he secured from Pope Paschal II, by a bull granted on 15 August 1115, exemption of his diocese from the supervisory control of the Archbishop of Braga. He greatly enlarged his diocese and the cathedral patrimony increased by the donations he secured; thus, in 1120, he received from D. Theresa jurisdiction over the City of Porto with all the rents and dues thereof. Bishop Hugo was present at the Council of Compostella in 1114, the Council of Sagunto in 1121 (under the presidency of Cardinal Boso, the papal Legate), and the Synod of Compostella in 1122.

John Peculiar was promoted to Braga (1138), his nephew, Pedro Rabaldis, succeeding at Porto. Next came D. Pedro Pitões (1145 to 1152 or 1155), D. Pedro Sénior (d. 1172), and D. Fernão Martins (d. 1185). Martinho Pires instituted a chapter and was promoted to Braga in 1189 or 1190. Martinho Rodrigues ruled from 1191 to 1235. He quarreled with the chapter over their share of the rents of the see. Later on, fresh disagreements arose in which King Sancho I intervened against the bishop, who was deprived of his goods and had to flee, but was restored by the king when Innocent III espoused the bishop's cause. Another quarrel soon arouse between prelate and king, and the bishop was imprisoned; but he escaped and fled to Rome, and in 1209 the king, feeling the approach of death, made peace with him. His successor, Pedro Salvadores, figured prominently in the questions between the clergy and King Sancho II, who refused to ecclesiastics the right of purchasing or inheriting land. Portugal fell into anarchy, in which the clergy's rights were violated and their persons outraged, though they themselves were not guiltless. Finally, Pope Innocent IV committed the reform of abuses to Afonso III, brother of Sancho II who lost his crown.

Under Bishop Julian (1247–60) the jurisdiction difficulty became aggravated. A settlement was effected at the Cortes of Leiria (1254), which the bishop refused to ratify, but he had to give way. When King Afonso III determined (1265) that all rights and properties usurped during the disorders of Sancho's reign should revert to the Crown, nearly all the bishops, including the Bishop of Porto, then D. Vicente, protested; and seven went to Rome for relief, leaving Portugal under an interdict. When the king was dying, in 1278, he promised restitution. Vicente (d. 1296) was one of the negotiators of the Concordat of 1289 and the supplementary Accord of Eleven Articles. He was succeeded by Sancho Pires, who ruled until 1300. Geraldo Domingues resigned in 1308 to act as counsellor of the King's daughter Constança, future Queen of Castile. Tredulo was bishop for two and a half years. The Minorite Frei Estêvão was succeeded in 1313 by his nephew Fernando Ramires. Both uncle and nephew quarrelled with King Denis and left the realm.

Owing to the hostility of the citizens, Bishop Gomes lived mostly outside his diocese. When Pedro Afonso became bishop in 1343, he had a quarrel over jurisdiction and, like his predecessor, departed, leaving the diocese under interdict. Six years later he returned, but again the monarch began to encroach, and it was not until 1354 that the bishop secured recognition of his rights. His successor was Afonso Pires. Egídio is probably the bishop represented in the old Chronicles as being threatened with scourging by King Pedro for having lived in sin with a citizen's wife The accusation was probably groundless, but Egídio left the city, which for twelve years had no bishop.

Other bishops were: John de Zambuja, or Estêvão; and Gil, who in 1406 sold the episcopal rights over Oporto to the Crown for an annual money payment, reduced in the reign of D. Manuel to 120 silver marks; Fernando Guerra, who in 1425 was created Archbishop of Braga; and Vasco. Antão Martins de Chaves, who succeeded Vasco in 1430, was sent by the pope to Constantinople to induce the Greek emperor to attend the Council of Basle. He succeeded, and as a reward was made cardinal. He died in 1447. Succeeding incumbents were: Durando; Gonçalves de Óbidos; Luis Pires (1454–64), a negotiator of the Concordat of 1455 and a reforming prelate; João de Azevedo (1465–1494), a benefactor of the cathedral and chapter, as was his successor Diego de Sousa, afterwards Archbishop of Braga and executor of King Manuel I. The see was then held by two brothers in succession, Diogo da Costa (1505-7) and D. Pedro da Costa (1511–39), who restored the bishop's palace and enriched the capitular revenues from his own purse; Belchior Beliago; and the Carmelite Frei Baltazar Limpo (1538–52), the fiftieth bishop. He held a diocesan synod in 1540.

In the time of Rodrigo Pinheiro, a learned humanist, Porto was visited by St. Francis Borgia and the Jesuits established themselves in the city. Aires da Silva, ex-rector of Coimbra University, after ruling four years, fell in the battle of Alcácer Quibir in 1578 with King Sebastião. Simão Pereira was followed by the Franciscan Frei Marcos de Lisboa, chronicler of his order. He added to the cathedral and convoked a diocesan synod in 1585. In 1591 another ex-rector of Coimbra, Jerónimo de Menezes, became bishop; he was succeeded by the Benedictine Frei Gonçalo de Morais, a zealous defender of the rights of the Church. He built a new sacristy and chancel in the cathedral. In 1618 Bishop Rodrigo da Cunha, author of the history of the Bishops of Oporto, was appointed. His "Catalogo", the earliest surviving account of the diocese, describes the state of the cathedral and enumerates the parishes of the diocese with their population and income in 1623. His successor was Frei João de Valadares, transferred from the See of Miranda. Gaspar do Rego da Fonseca held the see four years (1635–39). King Philip III named Francisco Pereira Pinto, but the revolution in 1640 prevented his taking possession; moreover he never received his bulls of consecration and installation from Pope Urban VIII, and therefore he could not be consecrated or installed as bishop. The diocese was considered vacant until 1670, being ruled by administrators appointed by the Chapter of the Cathedral (Vicars capitular). In 1641 King John IV chose D. Sebastião César de Menezes as bishop, but the pope, influenced by Spain, would neither recognize the new King of Portugal nor confirm his nominations. Next came Frei Pedro de Menezes; Nicolau Monteiro took possession in 1671; and Fernando Correia de Lacerda in 1673, who was succeeded by João de Sousa. Frei José Saldanha (1697–1708), famed for his austerity, never relinquished his Franciscan habit, a contrast to his successor Tomás de Almeida, who in 1716 became the first Patriarch of Lisbon. The see remained vacant until 1739, and, though Frei John Maria was then elected, he never obtained confirmation. In the same year Frei José Maria da Fonseca, formerly Commissary General of the Franciscans, became bishop. Several European States selected him as arbiter of their differences. He contributed to the canonization of a number of saints, and founded and restored many convents and hospitals.

Next in order were: Frei António de Távora (d. 1766), Frei Aleixo de Miranda Henriques, Frei João Rafael de Mendonça (1771–73), and Lourenço Correia de Sá Benevides (1796–98). Frei Antonio de Castro became Patriarch of Lisbon in 1814, being followed at Porto by João Avelar. Frei Manuel de Santa Inês, though elected, never obtained confirmation, but some years after his death, relations between Portugal and the Holy See were re-established by a concordat and Jerónimo da Costa Rebelo became bishop in 1843. From 1854 to 1859 the see was held by António da Fonseca Moniz; on his death it remained vacant until 1862, when João de Castro e Moura, who had been a missionary in China, was appointed (d.1868). The see was again vacant until the confirmation of Américo Ferreira dos Santos Silva in 1871. This prelate was obliged to combat the growing Liberalism of his flock and the Protestant propaganda in Porto. A popular lawyer named Mesquita started a campaign against him, because the bishop refused to dismiss some priests; a reputed reactionary, who served the Aguardente Chapel, got himself elected judge of the Brotherhood of the Temple and provoked a great platform agitation with the result that the chapel was secularized and became a school under the patronage of the Marquis of Pombal Association. In 1879 Américo was created cardinal and on his death (1911) Bishop António Barroso, an ex-missionary, was transferred from the see of Mylapore to that of Porto.

=== Cathedral ===
The Porto Cathedral was dedicated to the Assumption of the Blessed Virgin Mary into Heaven. It had a Chapter, a corporation composed of eight dignities (not dignitaries) and twelve Canons. The dignities included: the Dean, the Cantor, the Master of the Schola, the Theologus and the Archdeacon of Porto. On 9 September 1455 Bishop Luis Pires (1453-1464) instituted a second Archdeacon, the Archdeacon of Oliveira.

== Bishops ==
Partial list of the bishops of Porto. Bishops who were later elevated to the rank of cardinal are shown in bold typeface.

=== from 1100 to 1400 ===
#	Name	Date of birth	Appointed	Retired	Date of death
Vacant see (1091–1113)
13	Hugo		23 March 1113	7 December 1136	7 December 1136
14	João Peculiar, C.C.S.C.		1136	1138	3 December 1175
15	Pedro I RabaldesC.C.S.C.		by October 1138	29 June 1145	29 June 1145
16	Pedro II Pitões		before 1 July 1146	1152	
17	Pedro III Sénior		1154 ?	1174 ?	
18	Fernando I Martins		1176	1185	
19	Martinho I Pires		1186	1189	
19b	Martinho Rodrigues		1191	1227	
20	Julianus		1227	1230	1230
21	Pedro Salvadores		1231	24 June 1247	24 June 1247
22	Julião Fernandes		1247	31 October 1260	31 October 1260
23	Vicente Mendes		1261	shortly after 24 April 1296	after 24 April 1296
24	Sancho Pires		3 June 1296	7 January 1300	7 January 1300
25	Geraldo Palentino (Domingues)		19 March 1300	before 16 September 1307	5 March 1321
26	Frédole Capelier		16 September 1307	30 June 1309	30 June 1309
27	Stephanus, O. Min.		11 February 1310	8 October 1313	28 March 1326
28	Fernando II Ramires		19 March 1314	1322	
29	João II Gomes		25 March 1323	5 December 1327	5 December 1327
30	Vasco Martins		15 January 1328	25 September 1342	
31	Pedro Alfonso		25 September 1342	1357	1358 ?
32	Afonso Pires		1357	6 September 1372	6 September 1372
33	Lourenço Vicente		27 March 1373	6 November 1373	
34	João III		9 February 1373	c. 1388	c. 1388
35	Martinho Gil		4 June 1390	15 February 1391	
36	**João Afonso de Azambuja**		15 February 1391	1398	23 January 1415

=== from 1400 to 1700 ===
#	Name	Date of birth	Appointed	Retired	Date of death
37	Gil Alma		6 August 1399	1407	1415
38	João V Afonso Aranha		1407	1414	
39	Fernando da Guerra	1390	18 June 1414	15 December 1417	26 September 1467
39a	Joannes Alfonsi		26 January 1418	?	
40	Vasco Petri		2 April 1421	1423	1428
41	**António Martins de Chaves**		10 March 1423	1447	5 July 1447
43	Gonçalo I de Óbidos		18 August 1477	1453	
44	Luís Pires		24 August 1453	26 November 1464	March 1480
45	João VI de Azevedo		1465	1494	
46	Diogo I de Sousa		1494	1505	
47	Diogo II Álvares da Costa		1505	1507	
48	Pedro VI Álvares da Costa	1484	12 February 1507	8 January 1535	20 February 1563
49	Belchior Beliago		1535	1538	
50	Baltazar Limpo		1538	1552	
51	Rodrigo I Pinheiro		1552	1574	
52	Aires da Silva		1574	4 August 1578	4 August 1578
53	Simão de Sá Pereira (bishop)		13 November 1579		March 1581
54	Marcos de Lisboa, O.Min.		20 October 1581	13 September 1591	13 September 1591
55	Jerónimo I de Menezes		22 May 1592	12 December 1600	12 December 1600
56	Gonçalo de Morais. O.S.B.	1543	26 June 1602	20 October 1617	20 October 1617
57	Rodrigo II da Cunha	September, 1577	12 November 1618	27 January 1627	3 January 1643
58	João VII de Valadares, O.E.S.A.		30 August 1627	23 May 1635	23 May 1635
59	Gaspar do Rego da Fonseca		9 June 1636	13 July 1639	13 July 1639
Vacant see (1640–1670)
X	Francisco Pereira Pinto	Nominated in 1640 by Philip III of Portugal but did not receive approval from Pope Urban VIII.			
X	Sebastião César de Menezes	Nominated in 1641, 1659, and 1669 by John IV of Portugal, but not approved by the Pope			
X	Pedro VII de Menezes	Nominated in 1641, 1659, and 1669 by John IV of Portugal, but not approved by the Pope			
X	Luis de Souza	Nominated in 1641, 1659, and 1669 by John IV of Portugal, but not approved by the Pope			
60	Nicolau Monteiro	December 1581	15 December 1670	20 December 1672	20 December 1672
61	Fernando IV Correia de Lacerda		17 July 1673	before 1 September 1683	1 September 1685
62	João de Sousa	1647	6 December 1683	24 September 1696	28 September 1710

=== from 1700 to present ===
#	Name	Date of birth	Appointed	Retired	Date of death
63	José Saldanha, O.F.M.Disc.		17 December 1696	26 September 1708	26 September 1708
64	**Tomás de Almeida**	5 October 1670	22 July 1709	7 December 1716	27 February 1754
Vacant see (1716–1741)
X	João Maria	Appointed in 1739 but not confirmed by Pope Clement XII			
65	José Maria da Evora, O.F.M. Obs.	December 1690	2 January 1741	16 June 1752	16 June 1752
66	António de Távora, O.E.S.A.	September 1690	28 March 1757	1766	4 June 1766
67	Aleixo de Miranda Henriques, O.P.		1766	1771	
68	João Rafael de Mendonça	24 April 1717	1771	1793	1793
69	Lourenço Correia de Sá Benevides	25 March 1741	18 December 1795	1798	6 June 1798
70	António de São José, O.Cart.	April 1745	13 November 1798	12 April 1814	12 April 1814
71	João Magalhães de Avelar	22 December 1754	29 April 1816	16 May 1833	16 May 1833
72	Manuel de Santa Inês	Elected in 1833 but unconfirmed by Gregory XVI			
73	Jerónimo da Costa Rebelo		1843	1854	1854
74	António Fonseca Moniz		1854	1859	1859
Vacant see (1859–1862)
75	João de França Castro e Moura		1862	16 October 1868	16 October 1868
Vacant see (1868–1871)
76	**Americo Ferreira dos Santos Silva**	16 January 1829	26 June 1871	21 January 1899	21 January 1899
77	António José de Sousa Barroso	4 November 1854	20 May 1899	31 August 1918	31 August 1918
78	António Barbosa Leão	17 October 1860	16 July 1919	21 June 1929	21 June 1919
79	António Augusto de Castro Meireles	13 August 1885	21 June 1929	29 March 1942	29 March 1942
80	Agostinho de Jesus e Sousa	7 March 1877	16 May 1942	21 February 1952	21 February 1952
81	António Ferreira Gomes	10 May 1906	13 July 1952	2 May 1982	13 April 1989
82	Júlio Tavares Rebimbas	21 January 1922	12 February 1982	13 June 1997	6 December 2010
83	Armindo Lopes Coelho	13 February 1931	13 June 1997	22 February 2007	29 September 2010
84	**Manuel José Macário do Nascimento Clemente**	16 July 1948	22 February 2007	18 May 2013	—
Vacant see (2013–2014)
85	António Francisco dos Santos	29 August 1948	21 February 2014	11 September 2017	11 September 2017
86	Manuel da Silva Rodrigues Linda	15 April 1956	15 March 2018	—	—

== See also ==
- Porto history and timeline

== Bibliography ==
- Almeida, Fortunato da (1917). História da igreja em Portugal, Volume 3, parte 2. Coimbra: Imprensa académica, 1917.
- Cheney, David M. (16 August 2006). "Porto (Diocese)". The Hierarchy of the Catholic Church.
- Pedro Sainz de Barada, "Clave de la España Sagrada," Coleccion de Documentos Ineditos para la Historia de Espana Tomo XXII (Madrid 1853), pp. 110–113. [Bishops, 1766–1852]
- Da Cunha, Rodrigo (1623). Catalogo e historia dos Bispos do Porto (in Portuguese). Porto: Joao Rodriguez.
- Enrique Flórez; Manuel Risco; Antolín Merino; et al. (1766). España sagrada (in Spanish). Vol. Tomo XXI (Porto, Galicia). Madrid: M. F. Rodriguez.
- Knight, Kevin. "Catholic Encyclopedia: Oporto". The Catholic Encyclopedia, Volume IX. Robert Appleton Company.
- Mattoso, José (1968). Le monachisme ibérique et Cluny: les monastères du diocèse de Porto de l'an mille à 1200. Louvain: Publications de l'Université de Louvain, 1968. (in French)
- Peres, Damião; António Cruz; Bernardo Gabriel Cardoso Jr.; B. Xavier Coutinho; Conde de Campo Belo; Cruz Malpique; Artur Magalhães Basto; Eugénio da Cunha e Freitas; João Pinto Ferreira; Luís de Pina; Torquato Soares. "O Porto, Cidade Episcopal: Séculos XII a XIV". In Livraria Civilização Editora (ed.). História da Cidade do Porto (in Portuguese). illustrated by Gouvêa Portuense. Portucalense Editora. pp. 159–297. ISBN 972-26-0391-4.
- Thomás (da Encarnação da Costa e Lima) (1762). Historia ecclesiae Lusitanae (in Latin). Vol. Tomus III. Colimbriae: Ex praelo academia pontificiae.

=== Episcopal lists ===
- Gams, Pius Bonifatius (1873). Series episcoporum Ecclesiae catholicae: quotquot innotuerunt a beato Petro apostolo. Ratisbon: Typis et Sumptibus Georgii Josephi Manz. (Use with caution; obsolete)
- Eubel, Conradus, ed. (1913). Hierarchia catholica, Tomus 1 (second ed.). Münster: Libreria Regensbergiana. (in Latin)
- Eubel, Conradus, ed. (1914). Hierarchia catholica, Tomus 2 (second ed.). Münster: Libreria Regensbergiana. (in Latin)
- Gulik, Guilelmus (1923). Eubel, Conradus (ed.). Hierarchia catholica, Tomus 3 (second ed.). Münster: Libreria Regensbergiana.
- Gauchat, Patritius (Patrice) (1935). Hierarchia catholica IV (1592-1667). Münster: Libraria Regensbergiana.
- Ritzler, Remigius; Sefrin, Pirminus (1952). Hierarchia catholica medii et recentis aevi. Vol. Quintum (V) (1667-1730). Patavii: Messagero di S. Antonio.
- Ritzler, Remigius; Sefrin, Pirminus (1958). Hierarchia catholica medii et recentis aevi. Vol. Sextum (VI) (1730-1799). Patavii: Messagero di S. Antonio.
- Ritzler, Remigius; Sefrin, Pirminus (1968). Hierarchia Catholica medii et recentioris aevi sive summorum pontificum, S. R. E. cardinalium, ecclesiarum antistitum series... A pontificatu Pii PP. VII (1800) usque ad pontificatum Gregorii PP. XVI (1846) (in Latin). Vol. VII. Monasterii: Libr. Regensburgiana.
- Ritzler, Remigius; Pirminus Sefrin (1978). Hierarchia catholica Medii et recentioris aevi... A Pontificatu PII PP. IX (1846) usque ad Pontificatum Leonis PP. XIII (1903) (in Latin). Vol. VIII. Il Messaggero di S. Antonio.
- Pięta, Zenon (2002). Hierarchia catholica medii et recentioris aevi... A pontificatu Pii PP. X (1903) usque ad pontificatum Benedictii PP. XV (1922) (in Latin). Vol. IX. Padua: Messagero di San Antonio. ISBN 978-88-250-1000-8.
