= Frazão Arreigada =

- Civil parish
- Location in Portugal
- Coordinates: 41.266°N 8.415°W
- Country: Portugal
- Region: Norte
- Intermunic. comm.: Tâmega e Sousa
- District: Porto
- Municipality: Paços de Ferreira

Area
  - Total: 7.28 km^{2} (2.81 sq mi)

Population (2011)
  - Total: 6,263
  - Density: 860/km^{2} (2,200/sq mi)
- Time zone: UTC+00:00 (WET)
  - Summer (DST): UTC+01:00 (WEST)

Frazão Arreigada is a civil parish in the municipality of Paços de Ferreira, Portugal. It was formed in 2013 by the merger of the former parishes Frazão and Arreigada. The population in 2011 was 6,263, in an area of 7.28 km^{2}.
