= António Ferreira Gomes =

Roman Catholic bishop

His Most Reverend Excellency António Ferreira Gomes GCSE GCL
- Bishop of Porto
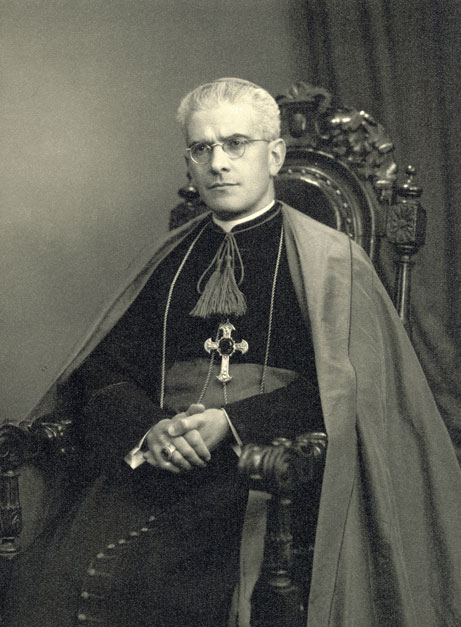
- António Ferreira Gomes, as Bishop of Porto
- Diocese: Diocese of Porto
- Appointed: 1952
- Installed: 1952
- Term ended: 1982
- Predecessor: Agostinho de Jesus e Sousa
- Successor: Júlio Tavares Rebimbas
- Previous post: Bishop of Portalegre

Personal details
- Born: May 10, 1906 Milhundos, Penafiel, Kingdom of Portugal
- Died: November 13, 1989 Ermesinde, Portugal
- Denomination: Roman Catholic

Styles of António Ferreira Gomes
- Reference style: His Most Reverend Excellency
- Spoken style: Your Excellency
- Religious style: Your Excellency

António Ferreira Gomes, GCSE, GCL (10 May 1906 – 13 April 1989) was a Portuguese Roman Catholic bishop, and is considered one of the most notable figures of Portuguese Catholic hierarchy in the 20th century. He was forced into a 10-year exile from Portugal due to his opposition to the Estado Novo.

== Career ==
Dom António was first appointed by Pope Pius XII as bishop of Portalegre, from 1949 to 1952. He was appointed bishop of Porto in 1952, a position that he held until 1982.

== Background ==
Gomes was a believer in Catholic social doctrine, which was emphasized by Pope Pius XII, particularly after World War II. Gomes was widely sympathetic to General Humberto Delgado, the Democratic Opposition candidate of the 1958 presidential elections, who was also a Catholic, and a former supporter of the Estado Novo. Gomes was unable to vote in those elections, as he was out of the country. Therefore, Gomes decided to write a letter to the Portuguese prime minister of the time, António de Oliveira Salazar, on 13 July 1958, the month after the presidential elections.

== Letter to Salazar and Exile (1958–1969) ==
The letter, which was meant to be private, acknowledged his former admiration for Salazar and some of Salazar's politics in the first years of his regime, but ultimately criticized his social politics, saying that they were promoters of poverty and social inequality; against some of the basic tenets recognized in Catholic social doctrine, such as the right to political association. He accused Salazar that instead of fighting Communism, his reactionary politics were promoting it, since they gave reason to many of the fair demands of the Communists. Gomes suggested that the regime should start political reforms, which would eventually lead to true democracy in Portugal, which was in line with the Catholic Church's social doctrine. The letter asked for a private meeting between Gomes and Salazar to debate these issues.

Salazar was outraged by the letter, since it broke the traditional mould of the Portuguese Catholic Church hierarchy being a mere tool of the regime. Salazar refused to answer it, but was unable to act against the bishop as he hadn't committed any crime within Portuguese legislation. Salazar decided to act more cynically: when the bishop was returning to Portugal in 1959, after a trip to Italy, he was denied entrance into Portugal. Salazar tried several times to force Gomes to resign, but he repeatedly refused. In a letter to António de Faria, the Portuguese ambassador at the Vatican in 1962, Salazar called Gomes "a sick person and the greatest evil was having made him a bishop". Gomes was still refused entry to Portugal when his mother died, forcing him to not attend the service. His exile abroad would last until the new Council President Marcello Caetano allowed his return in 1969.

== Return from Exile ==
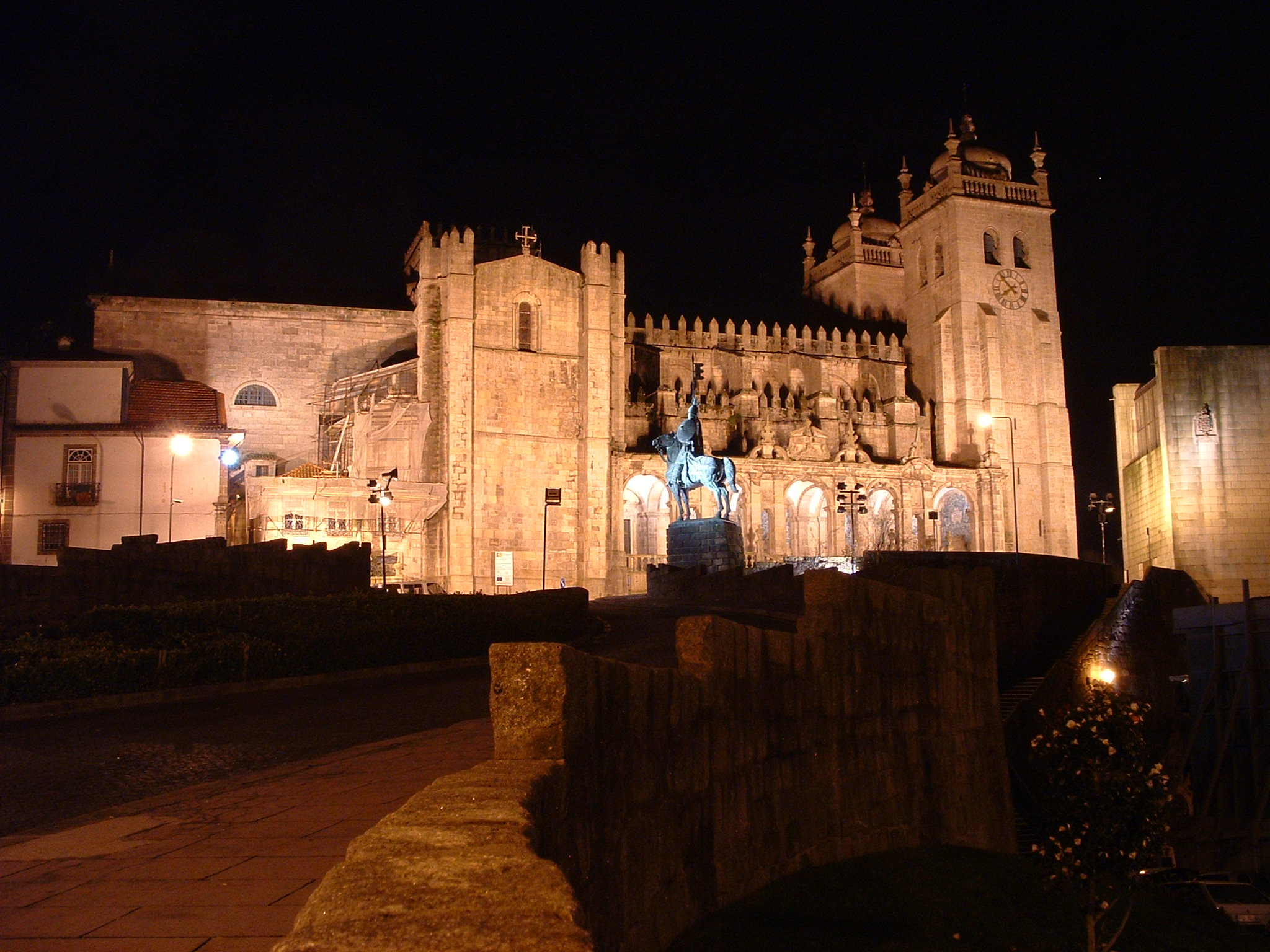
The Cathedral of Porto

In the last years of Salazar's regime, Gomes kept a low profile, but he remained a reference for the Catholic wing of the Democratic Opposition, to which he was widely sympathetic. In the aftermath of the 25 de Abril revolution which overthrew the authoritarian regime in 1974, he warned against the dangers of "philosophical materialism" and "money materialism".

He retired as Bishop of Porto in 1982 and died in Ermesinde in 1989.

== Honours ==
- Grand-Cross of the Order of Liberty, Portugal (April 22, 1980)
- Grand-Cross of the Order of Saint James of the Sword, Portugal (April 20, 2017)

== See also ==
- Humberto Delgado
- Henrique Galvão
