= Norman P. Tanner =

English Jesuit and historian of the Catholic Church

- Born: 26 February 1943 (age 83); Woking, Surrey, England
- Education: Ampleforth College (1956-1961); Heythrop College (LST, 1966); Oxford University (BA, 1969; MA, 1974; PhD, 1974); Pontifical Gregorian University (BT, 1976)

Norman P. Tanner, SJ (born 1943) is an English Catholic historian and priest of the Society of Jesus (Jesuit Order). He serves as a professor of Church History at the Pontifical Gregorian University in Vatican City, Rome.

== Early life and education ==
Norman P. Tanner was born 26 February 1943, in Woking, England to John Basil and Agnes Emily (née Tolhurst) Tanner.

He attended Ampleforth College from 1956 to 1961 before joining the Jesuits, where he was a novice from 1961 to 1963. In 1966, he completed a Licentiate of Sacred Theology at Heythrop College, University of London, under historian and philosopher Frederick Copleston, SJ. He later attended Oxford University, from which he earned a Bachelor of Arts (1969), Master of Arts (1974), and PhD (1974). Two years later, he earned a Bachelor of Theology from Pontifical Gregorian University.

== Career ==
From 1978 to 2003, Tanner taught at the University of Oxford, where he was appointed University Research Lecturer in 1997. He left Oxford in 2003 to join the Pontifical Gregorian University, where he teaches and conducts research.

An expert on Church councils, Tanner is widely recognized for his work as editor of Decrees of the Ecumenical Councils, a standard reference for the documents of Church councils. His research focuses on the later Middle Ages, with particular interest in popular religion during the medieval period. He has authored multiple books and articles on the history and practice of Church councils.

== Selected works ==
=== Authored ===
- Tanner, Norman (1984). The Church in Late Medieval Norwich, 1370-1532. Pontifical Institute of Mediaeval Studies.
- Tanner, Norman (2001). The Councils of the Church: A Short History. Crossroad.
- Tanner, Norman (2002). Is the Church too Asian?: Reflections on the Ecumenical Councils. Dharmaram Publications.
- Tanner, Norman P. (2003). Was the Church Too Democratic? Councils, Collegiality and the Church's Future. Dharmaram Publications. ISBN 978-81-86861-59-2.
- Tanner, Norman P. (2005). The Church and the World: Gaudium et Spes, Inter Mirifica. Rediscovering Vatican II. Mahwah, NJ: Paulist Press. ISBN 978-0-8091-4238-5.
- Tanner, Norman P. (2008). The Church in the Later Middle Ages. I.B. Tauris. ISBN 978-1-84511-438-1. OCLC 225653795.
- Tanner, Norman P. (2009). The Ages of Faith: Popular Religion in Late Medieval England and Europe. I.B. Tauris. ISBN 978-1-84511-760-3. OCLC 261268397.
- Tanner, Norman P. (2009). The Church in Council: Conciliar Movements, Religious Practice and the Papacy from Nicaea to Vatican II. I.B. Tauris. ISBN 978-1-84885-513-7.
- Tanner, Norman (2011). New Short History of the Catholic Church. Burns and Oates. ISBN 978-1-4411-4020-3.
- Tanner, Norman (2012). Vatican II: The Essential Texts.

=== Edited ===
- Tanner, Norman, ed. (1977). Heresy Trials in the Diocese of Norwich, 1428-31. Royal Historical Society.
- Tanner, Norman, ed. (1990). Decrees of the Ecumenical Councils. Georgetown University Press.
- Tanner, Norman P., ed. (1997). Kent Heresy Proceedings 1511-12. Kent Archaeological Society. ISBN 978-0-906746-25-7.
- McSheffrey, Shannon; Tanner, Norman P., eds. (2003). Lollards of Coventry, 1486-1522. Cambridge University Press. ISBN 978-0-521-83083-6.
