= Joseph A. Munitiz =

Welsh Roman Catholic Jesuit priest and academic (1931–2022)

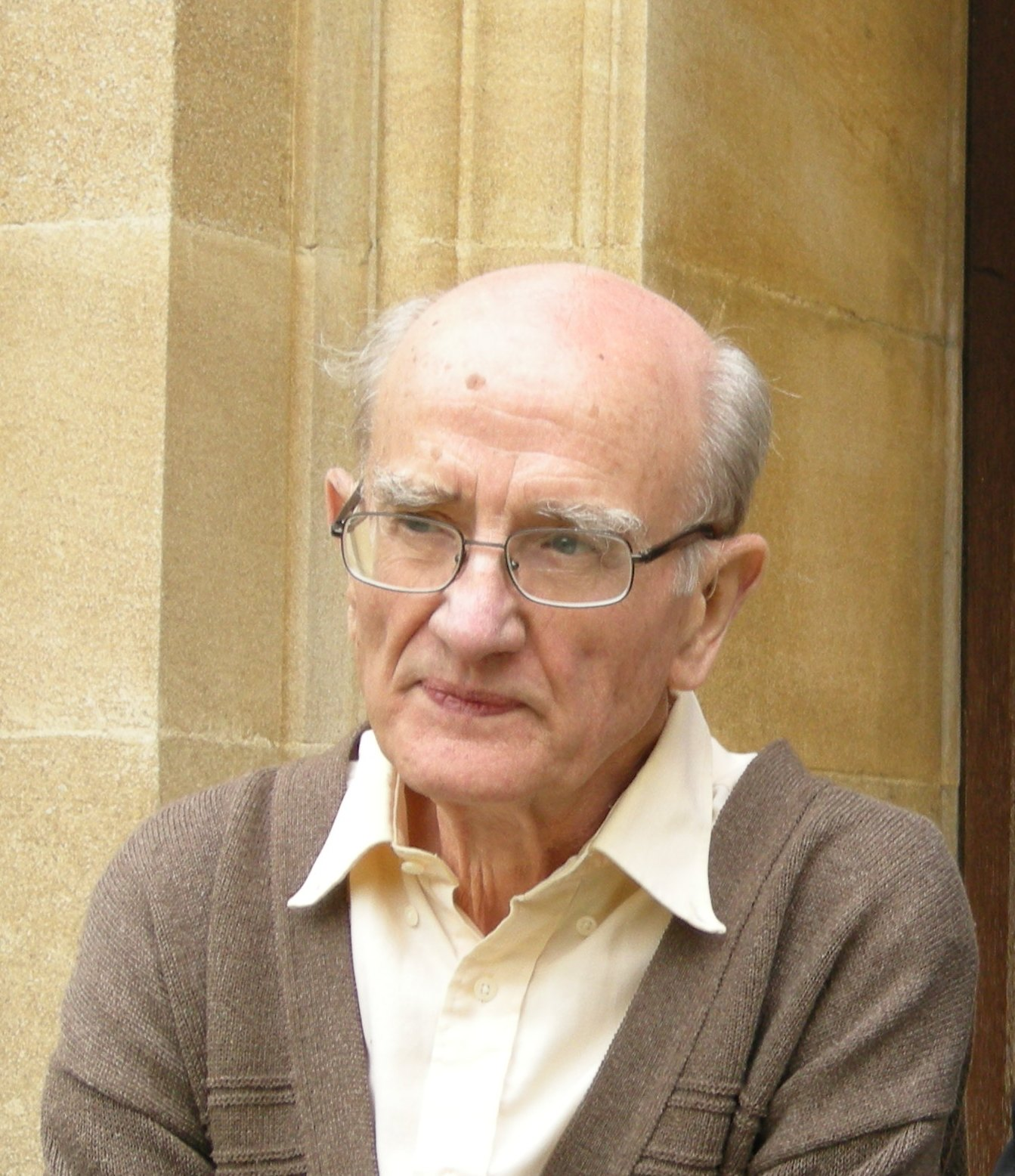
Joseph A. Munitiz

Joseph A. Munitiz (1931–2022) was a Roman Catholic Jesuit priest and academic.

Munitiz was born in Cardiff, Wales, of Basque parentage and educated by the Christian Brothers at Liverpool, and subsequently at the Junior Seminary at Comillas, Cantabria. Munitiz's multiple courses of study include Heythrop College, Campion Hall, Oxford, where he took the degree in Greats (Literae Humaniores), the Pontifical University (Comillas) in Spain, the Pontifical Oriental Institute Rome. He was appointed to the staff of Leuven University with special responsibility for the Series Graeca of Corpus Christianorum (now published by Brepols).

Munitiz served as Master of Campion Hall, Oxford, from 1989 until 1998. He was subsequently retained as a research fellow at Birmingham University before retiring to Campion in 2010 and then to a house in London in 2016.

Early research work with Marcel Richard on the Series Graeca led him to publishing his thesis on Theognostos (with an academic introduction in French) volume 5 in that series, and completing Richard's volume, the Questions and Answers of Anastasios of Sinai, vol. 59 (this time with the introduction in English). A third volume, 13, the Curriculum Vitae of Nikephoros Blemmydes, appeared in 1984. Other publications in the Byzantine tradition followed, and also translations of two of the SG volumes, Anastasios and Theognostos (Corpus Christianorum in Translation vols. 7 and 16), the Blemmydes translation having been published separately.

Munitiz has at various times edited the Heythrop Journal and the spiritual magazine The Way (for which he remained on the editorial board for some time).

His interest in the work of the founder of the Society of Jesus led to articles and most notably to a joint Penguin publication on Ignatius of Loyola's Personal Writings.

He died in July 2022, shortly after being released from hospital.

== Selected works ==
- Theognosti Thesaurus, ed. Joseph A. Munitiz, 1971 (Corpus Christianorum, Series Graeca, vol. 5)
- Anastasii Sinaitae Quaestiones et Responsiones, edd. Marcel Richard, Joseph A. Munitiz, 2006 Corpus Christianorum, Series Graeca, vol. 59)
- Ignatius Loyola, Personal Writings, ed. Philip Endean, Joseph Munitiz, Penguin Classics 2005

== Sources ==
- Campion Hall, Oxford, 'Joseph Munitiz' https://web.archive.org/web/20140714222658/http://www.campion.ox.ac.uk/Joseph_Munitiz.html
- Joseph A. Munitiz, Autobiographical tesserae, in Bram Roosen & Peter Van Deun, The Literary Legacy of Byzantium: Editions, Translations and Studies in Honour of Joseph A. Munitiz SJ, Brepols 2019
