= Heythrop Library =

Theology & philosophy library in London, England

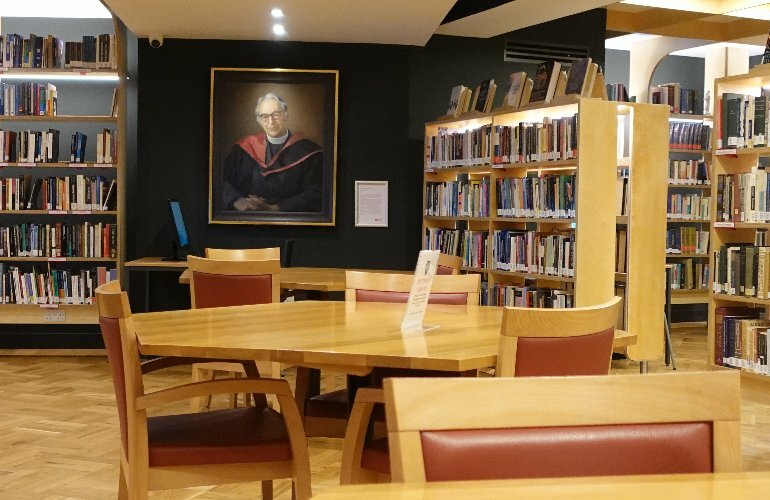
- Heythrop Library reading room, with a portrait of Federic Copleston
- 51.5099°N 0.1491°W
- Location: London
- Type: Special library
- Established: 1614

Collection
- Items collected: Books, incunabula, journals
- Size: 213,000

Access and use
- Access requirements: Membership

Other information
- Website: https://heythroplibrary.co.uk/

The Heythrop Library is a philosophy and theological library in London, England. The library was part of University of London when it functioned as the closed Heythrop College library. The library has continued to operate, independently of the closed college. Between 2018 and April 2025, the library was an affiliated library of the Senate House Library, which meant that it shared the library management system and database with the bigger library.

The library has been serving the Jesuit community in the United Kingdom, with The Telegraph calling it "one of the oldest and most important libraries of theological and philosophical books in the UK".

Since 2019, its reading room has been providing access to the collection at the London Jesuit Centre, Mount Street, Mayfair, London. The vast majority of the collection is housed in several off-site storage facilities. Only 8,000+ books and the latest issues of the 150+ live journals are available in the reading room. The library purchases in the region of 700 books on theology and philosophy each year.

The library is open to "anyone with a serious interest in theology or philosophy and the related academic disciplines represented in the collection", with different membership options available (from "free" to an annual charge). Current HE students, Jesuits and other Religious, as well as those unwaged might be able to benefit from free membership. The Library continues to provide historic as well as most-current research, in print, to those in training for ministry in the Catholic and other Christian churches and of the wider academic community. It also supports those engaged in programmes at the London Jesuit Centre.

The library is a member of ABTAPL (the Association of British Theological and Philosophical Libraries).

== History ==
Some of the collection of today's Heythrop Library dates back to 1614, when the Jesuits founded a college in Leuven, for educating future Jesuit priests preparing for work in what was then the English mission. The theology part of the collection was later stored at St Beuno's in Wales (today's St Beuno's Jesuit Spirituality Centre), where it was used by Jesuit poet Gerard Manley Hopkins.

Heythrop College opened in 1926 in Oxfordshire, and became a college of the University of London in 1970, closing in 2019. Since 2019 its library has continued to serve students and researchers. Until April 2025 its collection had been available through Senate House Library. The books are now solely available through a reading room at the London Jesuit Centre; over 700 incunabula and rare books of the Heythrop College Library are housed at Campion Hall, Oxford. Since June 2025 the Library has used Koha as its library management system.

== Collection ==
The library holds over 213,000 volumes, though the reading room at Mount Street only contains 8,000 volumes plus the latest issues of journals the library subscribes to. The collection focuses on material in theology, philosophy and some allied disciplines; with particular strong holdings in (Roman Catholic and) Christian theology, philosophy and spirituality (especially relating to Ignatian Spirituality) and the Society of Jesus. In the 1980s the Heythrop Library also housed books from the Linacre Centre Library (the former name of the Anscombe Bioethics Centre) collection.
