= Brendan Callaghan =

Jesuit clergyman

Brendan Callaghan SJ (born 29 July 1948) is a psychologist of religion He was Principal of Heythrop College, London 1985–1997, and Master of Campion Hall, Oxford 2008–2013.

His work has included teaching psychology of religion, (for some years on an MA programme he founded at Heythrop), the formation of Jesuits in preparation for ordination, directing retreats, and continuing spiritual direction/accompaniment.

He has also served as the Novice-Master for the North-Western Europe Provinces of the Society of Jesus, and is currently the Superior of the Jesuit retirement community in Boscombe, Bournemouth.

== Selected works ==
- Kenneth Boyd, Brendan Callaghan, and Edward Shotter, Life before birth: a search for consensus on abortion and the treatment of infertility (London: SPCK, 1986)

Academic offices
Preceded by Peter L'Estrange	Master of Campion Hall, Oxford; 2008–2013	Succeeded by James Hanvey
