= Edward Yarnold =

English Jesuit priest and theologian

Edward Yarnold SJ (14 January 1926 – 23 July 2002) was an English Jesuit priest and theologian who was Master of Campion Hall from 1965 to 1972 at the University of Oxford.

== Life ==
Yarnold was born in Kingston-upon-Thames and brought up in Leeds where he attended St Michael's College.

In 1943, Yarnold became a member of the Society of Jesus at St Beuno's, North Wales. He then studied classics at Campion Hall in Oxford and philosophy and theology at Heythrop College. In 1960, he was ordained as a priest and then taught Latin and Greek at his former school, St Michael's. In 1964 he returned to the University of Oxford and from 1965 he held the office of Master of Campion Hall for 12 years until 1972. He died in Oxford on 23 July 2002.

== Functions ==
- Master of Campion Hall (1965–1972)
- Chairman of the University Faculty Board of Theology
- President of the Catholic Theological Association of Great Britain (1986–1988)
- General editor of the Theology Today series
- Co-editor of The Study of Liturgy
- Member of the Ecumenical Society of the Blessed Virgin Mary

== List of works ==
- The Theology of Original Sin (Fides Publishers, 1971) ISBN 9780853422785
- The Awe-Inspiring Rites of Initiation (1972, 1994) ISBN 9780567292438
- The Study of Liturgy, co-editor (1978)
- They Are in Earnest: Christian Unity in the Statements of Paul VI, John Paul I, John Paul II (1982) ISBN 9780854392124
- Eight Days With The Lord (1984)
- The Study of Spirituality, co-editor (1986)
- In Search of Unity (1989) ISBN 9780814619209
- Time For God: Guidelines for a Full-Time or Part-Time Retreat (1991)
- Anglicans and Roman Catholics in Search of Unity, co-editor (1994)

== Award ==
In 1981, Yarnold was awarded the Cross of St Augustine by the Archbishop of Canterbury for his contribution to ecumenism.
