= David William Parry =

British author

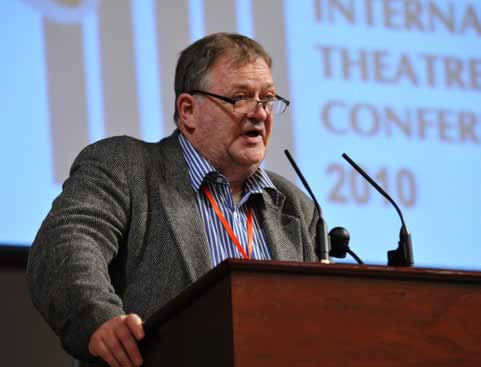
- Born: David William Parry; 1958 (age 67–68); Portsmouth
- Occupation: Author
- Website: www.davidwilliamparry.com

David William Parry is a British author.

== Life ==
David William Parry was born in Portsmouth in 1958. He was raised in Fareham by his Anglican mother and Roman Catholic stepfather.

He graduated from King's College, London, with an undergraduate degree in Religious Studies; from Heythrop College, with a graduate degree in Pastoral Studies; and from the University of South Wales, with a PhD in English. His doctoral thesis, "Cultivating Presence: A Conceptual Autoethnography Examining Neofolk and Its Relation to Contemporary Miracle and Mystery Traditions," was published in 2025.

== Career ==
=== Writing ===
Parry's first book, Caliban's Redemption (2004), is a collection of occult poems. Writing in The London Magazine, Richard Rudgley described Parry's poetry as "homoerotic mysticism".

His second, The Grammar of Witchcraft (2009), combines poetry and prose. An adaptation of the poetry was staged at Etcetera Theatre in Camden in 2022. John Cutler of The Reviews Hub called it "the theatrical equivalent of pâté de foie gras: dense (rich even), provocative in its ingredients, not to everyone’s taste, and probably best enjoyed only occasionally".

Parry's fourth book and first play, Women in Mayhem, was also staged at the Etcetera Theatre in August 2024.

=== Religion ===
Parry has served as a worship leader, prison visitor and Bible Study teacher in the Metropolitan Community Church in Balham; as a lay minister in "a number of British Unitarian churches"; and as the caretaking pastor of the Coverdale and Ebenezer Congregational Church in Shadwell.

In 2013, Indymedia reported that Parry had been "initiated … as a Priest of Nerthus" by Freya Aswynn.

Parry is presently active in the Old Catholic Apostolic Church. As of 2021, he led the St. Valentine's Hall congregation in South London. In August 2021, BBC London News described Parry's church "as a safe haven for the LGBTQ+ community". In this role he appeared as a contestant on Jimmy Carr's I Literally Just Told You in 2022.

=== Other activities ===
From 2014 to 2021, Parry co-hosted a weekly podcast show called THA Talks with Paul Obertelli, intended to encourage "Free Thoughts and Open Minds". According to Hope not Hate, Parry co-founded the Extremists Club with Jez Turner. In 2017, The Independent reported that in an infiltration of the “alt-right” in the UK, Patrik Hermansson of Hope not Hate was introduced to The Extremists Club.

In 2013, Parry was interviewed by The Guardian about the UK Border Agency's treatment of a Russian-born poet, Alex Galper (who had studied under Allen Ginsberg). Parry was Chairman of Eurasian Creative Guild (ECG).

In 2019, Parry spoke at TEDxLambeth alongside Haralampi G. Oroschakoff, in a talk entitled "A Chat on Conceptual Arts". In 2021, he addressed TEDxLambeth on "Pop Art through the Eyes af a Queer Pastor" and "Conversations, Definitions and Stories."

He is a Fellow of the Royal Asiatic Society, the Royal Anthropological Institute and the Royal Society of Arts.

== Works ==
- Caliban's Redemption. 1st ed. Oxford: Mandrake of Oxford, 2004. 2nd ed. Finatran, 2011.
- The Grammar of Witchcraft. 1st ed. Oxford: Mandrake, 2009. 2nd ed. London: Hertfordshire Press, 2016.
- Mount Athos Inside Me: Essays on Religion, Swedenborg and Arts. Melbourne, Aus.: Manticore, 2019.
- Women in Mayhem: Or Three Nonsensical Pranks. Melbourne, Aus.: Indigo Dragon, 2024.
- Cultivating Presence: A Conceptual Autoethnography Examining Neofolk and Its Relation to Contemporary Miracle and Mystery Traditions. Melbourne, Aus.: Manticore, 2025.
