= Elizabeth Burns (philosopher) =

British philosopher of religion and academic

Education
- Education: Queens' College, Cambridge (PhD)
- Thesis: The ontology of quasi-theism: a study of two twentieth century reinterpretations of the Christian faith (1995)

Elizabeth Denise Burns is a British philosopher of religion and academic. She was dean of undergraduate studies at Heythrop College, University of London, from 2003 to 2008, and lectures in philosophy of religion.

== Career ==
She has a Bachelor of Divinity (BD), specialising in philosophy of religion and ethics, from King's College London. She has a Doctor of Philosophy (PhD) degree from Queens' College, Cambridge, where her research focused on Don Cupitt and Iris Murdoch. Her doctoral thesis was titled "The ontology of quasi-theism: a study of two twentieth century reinterpretations of the Christian faith" and was completed in 1995.

She was a lecturer in religious studies at Suffolk College, Ipswich, from 1992 until she came to Heythrop in 1999. From 2000 to 2003 she was the course director for the University of London BD for External Students. She was promoted to reader in philosophy of religion in 2017.

She currently teaches an intercollegiate philosophy of religion course for the University of London MA philosophy, and also teaches interpreting religious language, and conducts the seminars and tutorials for philosophy, religion and ethics students.

== Publications ==
Her publications include:

- 'Michael Martin on Divine Omniscience', Think 10 (Summer 2005).
- 'Religion Without 'Superstition'? A Realist View', Dialogue 24 (April 2005).
- ‘Transforming Metaphysics? Revisioning Christianity in the Light of Analytical Philosophy’, in Faith and Analysis: A Critical Look at the Impact of Analytical Philosophy on the Philosophy of Religion eds. Harriet A. Harris and Christopher Insole (Farnborough: Ashgate Publishing Ltd, 2005).
- Religious Language Subject Guide (London: External Publications, University of London, 2004, second edition).
- ‘Philosophy of Religion’, in Philosophy for AS and A2, Elizabeth Burns and Stephen Law (eds) (London: Routledge, 2004).
- Review of Philosophy: Key Themes and Philosophy: Key Texts, Julian Baggini (Basingstoke: Palgrave Macmillan, 2002), Think, Spring 2004, 103–105.
- Philosophy of Religion Subject Guide (London: External Publications, University of London, 2003, second edition).
- Buddhism Subject Guide (London: External Publications, University of London, 2002).
- The Church to AD461 Subject Guide (London: External Publications, University of London, 2000).
- ‘Iris Murdoch and the Nature of Good’, Religious Studies 33 (1997), 303–313.
- A review of The God Delusion
