= Catherine Pepinster =

British journalist (born 1959)

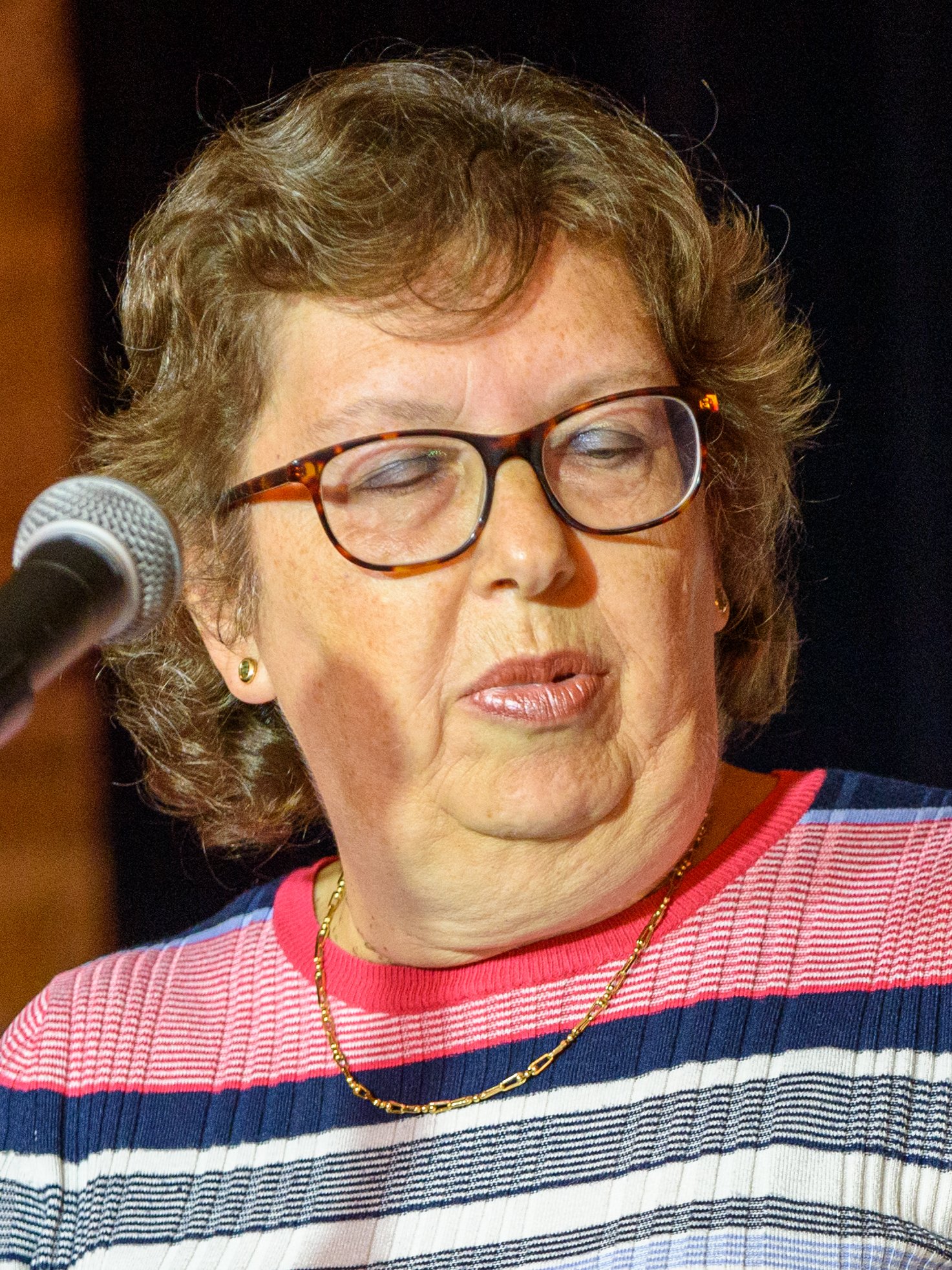
- Pepinster in 2022
- Born: 7 June 1959 (age 67)
- Education: University of Manchester; City, University of London; Heythrop College
- Occupations: Writer, journalist, historian, editor
- Writing career
- Genres: Religion, history
- Notable works: The Keys and the Kingdom: The British and the Papacy from John Paul II to Francis

Catherine Marie Pepinster (born 7 June 1959) is an English editor, historian, commentator and writer with a focus on theology, Catholic and Anglican ecumenism, church history, and religion and politics. She was the first female editor of The Tablet in the newspaper's 176-year history. In 2017 she published the book The Keys and the Kingdom: The British and the Papacy from John Paul II to Francis.

== Education ==
Pepinster has a BA in economics and social science from the University of Manchester, a postgraduate diploma in journalism from City, University of London, and an MA in philosophy and religion from Heythrop College, University of London.

== Career ==
Pepinster began her career in journalism as a reporter for a newspaper in Manchester and Sheffield in 1981. In 1985, she worked as a property correspondent for the Sheffield Telegraph before becoming a chief reporter at Estates Times in 1986. In 1987, she was a news editor for Building and in 1989 she began working as a reporter for The Observer. She worked as a news editor for Time Out until 1994, when she began working as an assistant news editor at The Independent on Sunday. She was promoted to deputy news editor at The Independent on Sunday in 1995 and promoted again to news editor in 1997. In 199,8 she transferred to a job as a features editor at The Independent before going back to The Independent on Sunday in 1999 to work as an assistant editor. She was promoted to executive editor in 2002. Pepinster worked as the executive editor of The Independent on Sunday until joining The Tablet as editor in 2004. Upon her appointment, Pepinster became the first female editor in The Tablet's 176 year history. During her period as editor, she was responsible for covering three papacies, those of John Paul II, Benedict XVI, and Francis. She led the paper during the death of John Paul II, the election and resignation of Benedict XVI as well as his state visit to the United Kingdom in 2010, and the conclave that elected Francis. While editor, Pepinster helped modernise The Tablet by redesigning its online presence and creating social media accounts. She led the paper as it marked its 175th anniversary. In December 2016, Pepinster stepped down from the position as editor of The Tablet, after serving in the role for thirteen years, and was succeeded by Brendan Walsh.

In 2005, Pepinster edited the book John Paul II: Reflections from The Tablet, which was a collection of written works by members of the staff at The Tablet.

On 16 November 2017, Pepinster's book The Keys and the Kingdom: The British and the Papacy from John Paul II to Francis, which focuses on the politics and relationships between the Catholic Church and the British Crown, was published.

Since leaving The Tablet, Pepinster has contributed as a religion and politics writer for The Guardian, the National Catholic Reporter, Catholic Herald, The Christian Century, Religion News Service, The Telegraph, and Crux. Her work has also been featured in America Magazine.

In April 2017, Pepinster was appointed as the United Kingdom's Development Officer for the Anglican Centre in Rome.

== Personal life ==
Pepinster is a practising Catholic and describes herself as liberal. She is a survivor of breast cancer. Pepinster supports Brentford Football Club.
