= Kevin T. Kelly =

Kevin T. Kelly (27 June 1933 – 25 September 2018) was a British Roman Catholic priest and moral theologian.

== Biography ==
Kelly was born in Crosby, just north of Liverpool, England on 27 June 1933, to Patrick and Winifred Kelly from Northern Ireland. He was a pioneering priest and theologian, who nurtured a compassionate approach to Catholic morality from the 1960s. In his academic and pastoral work, he tackled some of the most pressing issues facing the Church today, including human conscience, HIV/AIDS, divorce and second marriage, bioethics, sexual ethics, and pastoral theology in general.

After formative years at the Upholland Senior Seminary, Lancashire, where he would later return to work, Kelly was further educated at Fribourg University, Switzerland and at the Gregorianum University, Rome. At Fribourg he completed a doctorate in moral theology and in Rome he gained a licentiate in Canon Law. The author of seven books and well over a hundred articles and chapters elsewhere, he has worked tirelessly in urban parishes and academic settings alike, from the very outset of his priestly calling.

He began his academic career at St Joseph's Seminary, Upholland, England (1965–75), during which time he also served as a visiting lecturer at the University of Manchester, looking after the students of Ronald Preston, and further honing his ecumenical vision and commitment. Kevin embarked upon that tireless combination of being both an academic moral theologian at one and the same time as being a pastor at the ‘coal face’, when he was appointed to serve as assistant priest at St Clare's Parish in Liverpool from 1963 to 1965.

In 1975 Kelly became the founding director of the Upholland Institute, a centre and professional team for adult Christian education and in-service training for clergy. In this role he initiated pioneering educational and formational programs. Kelly would bring in visiting lecturers such as Bernard Häring and Charles E. Curran. Here Kelly worked tirelessly to involve the laity, women as well as men, in the institute's many courses and activities. Thus putting into action the ecclesial vision of Vatican II.

In 1980 Kelly was a visiting fellow at St Edmund's College, University of Cambridge where pressing pastoral and ethical questions concerning divorce and second marriage preoccupied much of his research. During this time he also embarked on a tour of countries where major ethical challenges were being responded to through grass roots activism and the newly emerged liberation theology. His travels took him to India, the Philippines and Peru.

Kevin then played a leading role in the experimental "Team Ministry" that was in the new town of Skelmersdale, serving from 1981 to 1985. The "Thatcher Years" of government were pressing times for the northern regions of England in particular. The early optimism that followed the founding of this new town soon turned to harsher realities for many in this part of the country. This innovative, dynamic and yet most challenging appointment left Kelly with many ideas he wished to explore in those hours of the week he gave over to his continuing academic studies. These questions pursued him so much that he eventually took leave to take up a Research Fellowship at Queen's College, Birmingham, where he completed his pioneering book on bioethics (1985–86).

Kelly did not put his pastoral ministry on hold for very long, and he was back in parish ministry at Our Lady's, Eldon St., in inner-city Liverpool as soon as 1986, continuing there until 1998.

This full-time ministry was actually carried out in only half of Kelly's "real" time as he soon began a regular commute to London, where he had been asked by Jack Mahoney to teach at Heythrop College, the specialist theology and philosophy college of the University of London. Kelly soon found himself covering much of the moral theology at Heythrop and utilising his train journeys to great effect as a makeshift study. Kevin continued this bi-locatory dual-existence from 1986 until 1993.

Kelly's most recent educational attachments came at Liverpool Hope University, first of all as a part-time lecturer in Christian Ethics at its former incarnation as the Liverpool Institute of Higher Education between 1993 and 94. He then returned when it became a university college to be Senior Research Fellow (again part-time) between 1996 and 98. Finally, he was elevated to emeritus Senior Research Fellow status in 1998.

Kelly has contributed to research initiatives, conferences and international gatherings on almost every continent of the world. His research and pastoral antennae have also taken him on numerous further visits to places such as the United States, Canada, Ireland and Continental Europe. In 1967, he was a co-founding member of the Association of Teachers of Moral Theology. In 1995, Kevin visited Thailand and the Philippines, taking part in an Asian theological consultation on the challenges of HIV/AIDS, and interviewing many people in connection with research for his forthcoming book on the subject, particularly to inform his reflections on the impact of these conditions upon women and upon how the position of women in society exacerbated the dilemmas posed by HIV/AIDS. In 1997, Kelly was also a co-founding member of the International Catholic Theological Coalition for HIV/AIDS Prevention, and, in 1999, he spent the summer in Zimbabwe and Zambia, helping to run two National Winter schools in the former which sought to educate people on the moral and pastoral issues concerning the care of those whose lives are affected by HIV/AIDS. Whilst there he sought out further experiential research opportunities through visiting partners of the UK Catholic aid agency (CAFOD) responsible for the care of AIDS orphans and also for AIDS home-care initiatives.

His pastoral achievements, however, were yet to take a further turn after his inner-city work and weekly sessions in the "library on wheels" that the train to and from London became for him. Kelly's doctoral dissertation explored the work of Anglican moral theologians of the 17th century, and his ecumenical sensitivity and commitment, as indicated, have been amongst the most constant features of his life and career. Kelly took up the post as Catholic Pastor of the Ecumenical Anglican and Roman Catholic church of St Basil's and All Saints, at Hough Green near Widnes.

Liverpool Hope University announced that they will be awarding Kevin Kelly an honorary Doctorate at its graduation ceremony in 2007 and The Centre for the Study of Contemporary Ecclesiology has honoured Kevin Kelly by awarding him its very first Honorary Fellowship for his services to the church, to pastoral care, to moral theology, to ecumenism and to the wider community in general.

Kelly died on 25 September 2018, at the age of 85.

== Publications ==
- From a Parish Base: Essays in Moral and Pastoral Theology (Darton Longman and Todd, 1999)
- New Directions in Sexual Ethics: Moral Theology and the Challenge of AIDS (Continuum, 1998)
- New Directions in Moral Theology: The Challenge of Being Human (Continuum, 1992)
- Conscience: Dictator or Guide? A Study in 17th Century English Protestant Moral Theology (Geoffrey Chapman, 1967)
- Divorce and Second Marriage: Facing the Challenge, (Collins, 1982)
- Life and Love: Towards a Christian dialogue on bioethical questions, (Collins, 1987)
- Divorce and Second Marriage: Facing the Challenge, New and Expanded Edition, (Geoffrey Chapman, 1997)

== Selection of contributions to other publications ==
- 'The Role of the Moral Theologian in the Church', in R Gallagher & B McConvery (edits), Conscience and History, Gill & Macmillan, 1989, 8–23
- 'Divorce and Remarriage', in Bernard Hoose (edit), Christian Ethics: An Introduction, Geoffrey Chapman, 1998, 248–265
- 'Divorce', in Adrian Hastings (editor), The Oxford Companion to Christian Thought, Oxford University Press, 2000, 172–173
- 'A Moral Theologian faces the new Millennium in a time of AIDS', in James Keenan (editor), with Jon Fuller, Lisa Sowle Cahill & Kevin Kelly, Catholic Ethicists on HIV/AIDS Prevention, Continuum, 2000, 324–332.
- 'Some theological reflections on the parish reports', in Noel Timms (edit), Diocesan Dispositions & Parish Voices in RC Church, Ashgate, 2001, 167–180
- 'Divorce and Remarriage', in James J Walter, Timothy E O'Connell & Thomas A Shannon (editors), A Call to Fidelity: On the Moral Theology of Charles E Curran, Georgetown University Press, 2002, 97–112
- 'Resuscitation', in Peter Drury, Tony Flynn, Kevin T Kelly, Resuscitation: Whose Decision? Christian Council on Ageing, 2003, 13–25
- 'It's Great to be Alive', in Linda Hogan & Barbara Fitzgerald, Between Poetry and Politics: Essays in honour of Enda McDonagh Columba Press, 2003.
