= Johannes Hoff =

German philosopher

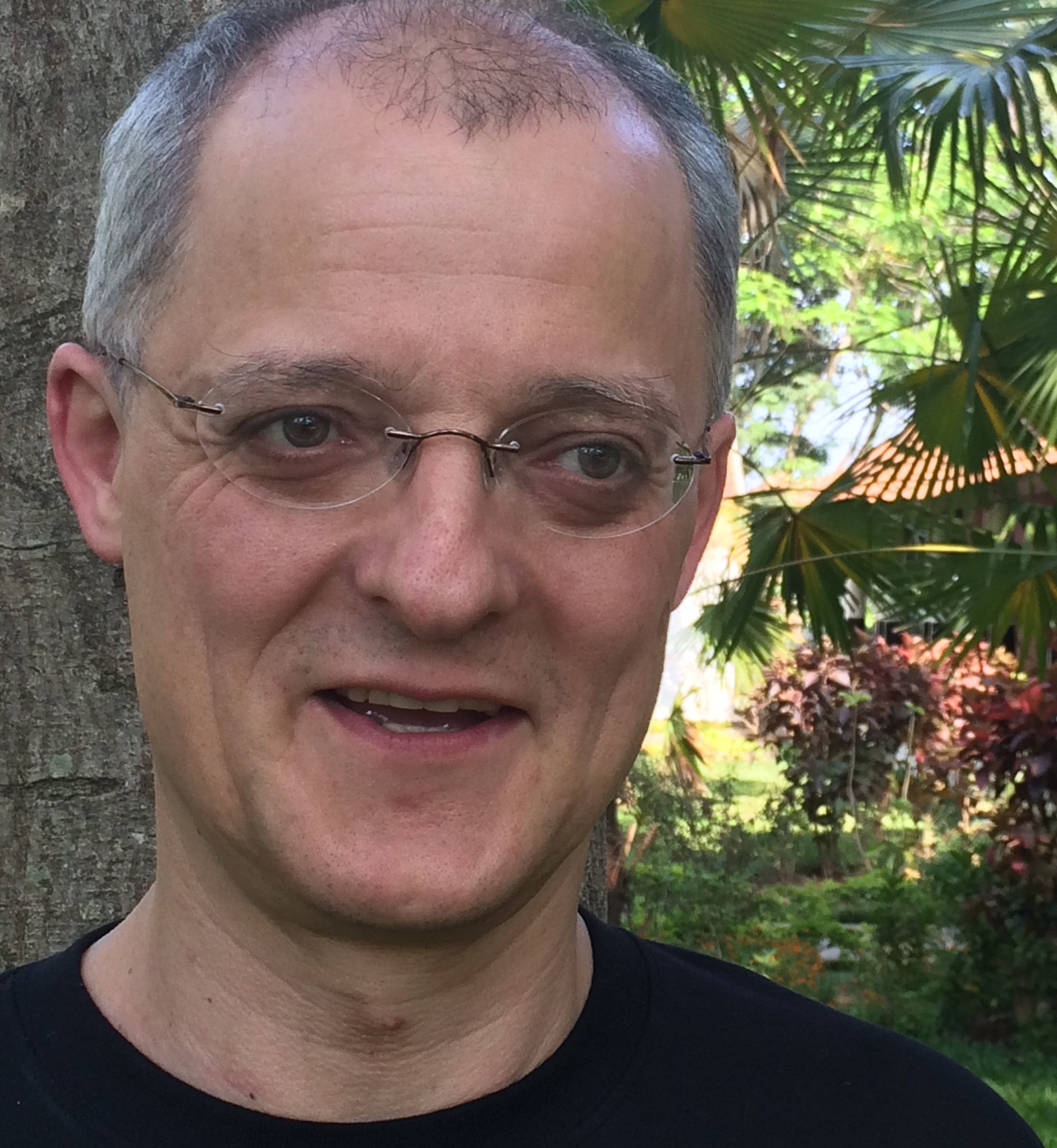
- Citizenship: German
- Occupations: Christian philosopher, theologian, and university professor
- Known for: Professor at the Institute of Systematic Theology of the University of Innsbruck (Austria).

Johannes Hoff is a German Christian philosopher, theologian, and university professor. He is Full Professor at the Institute of Systematic Theology of the University of Innsbruck (Austria). His research focuses on anthropology in the age of artificial intelligence, the spiritual resources of human intelligence, and the pre-modern tradition of Christian orthodoxy, building on the performative turn of phenomenology and a realist trajectory in post-analytic philosophy and theology.

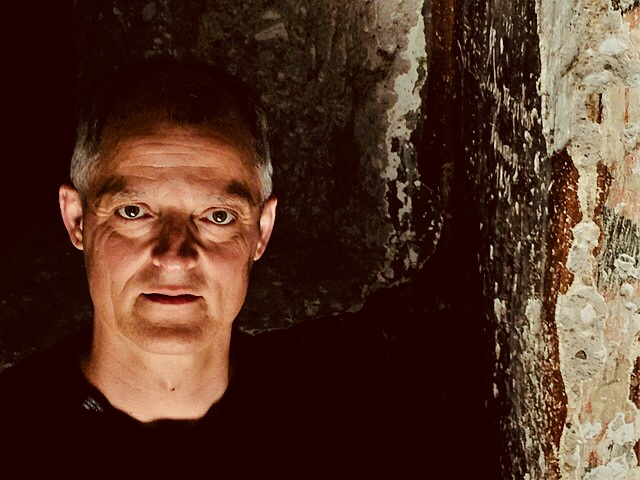
Hoff in 2015

== Biography ==
Before holding the Professorship for Systematic Theology at Innsbruck, succeeding Karl Rahner, Hoff served as Professor of Philosophical Theology at Heythrop College, University of London, at University of Wales Trinity Saint David (previously University of Wales, Lampeter), and was Assistant Professor at the Faculty of Catholic Theology at the Eberhard Karls University of Tübingen.

His first academic monograph explored the theological implications of the work of Jürgen Habermas, Jacques Derrida, Michel Foucault, and Michel de Certeau (Spiritualität und Sprachverlust, 1999); his second examined the Renaissance philosophy of Nicholas of Cusa (Kontingenz, Berührung, Überschreitung, 2007).

His English-language book, The Analogical Turn: Rethinking Modernity with Nicholas of Cusa (2013), tackled modern science’s reliance on mathematically generated world-images, along with the associated allure of immersive virtual realms. It was the subject of an online symposium of the Syndicate Network.

He is Senior Research Associate at the Von Hügel Institute of the University of Cambridge (UK). and director of the research project "Embodiment in Theological Anthropology," funded by the Austrian Science Fund (FWF), begun in September 2023, which investigates the significance of the body/living body problem for Christian doctrine from historical and systematic perspectives, including the patristic doctrine of the deification of man (theosis). He also collaborates with the “Institute for Information Systems & Society” at the Vienna University of Economics and Business.

== Work and ideas ==
Hoff’s approach bridges theology, philosophy, and cultural critique, interpreting the technological and artistic revolutions of the Renaissance and late medieval Scholasticism as the root of modernity’s spiritual crisis. Drawing on Michel Foucault, Michel de Certeau, Henri de Lubac, John Milbank and Charles Taylor, he contends that contemporary societies suffer from a “loss of orientation,” requiring the recovery of virtue-ethical and spiritual practices.

=== Anthropology in the Age of AI and the Digital Transformation ===
In his German monograph Verteidigung des Heiligen. Anthropologie der Digitalen Transformation (2021) (Defence of the Sacred), Hoff presents a synthesis of his recent work on anthropology in the age of artificial intelligence. He argues that the digital transformation, through its accelerated commercialization and technological power, has provoked a civilizational rupture which demands a revision of the theological underpinnings of modern humanity, rooted in Renaissance-era media-technological innovations. He maintains that humans must recover their “spiritual potentials” in order to distinguish themselves from computing machines, thus affirming their status as personal beings endowed with intellect.

In line with this view, Hoff’s research on a Trinitarian anthropology of technology, drawing on Augustine and Nicholas of Cusa, aims to reclaim spiritual and virtue-based frameworks for thinking about human intelligence, embodiment, and technological artifacts.

=== 4e Cognition in Theological Anthropology ===
Against this backdrop, Hoff and Enrico Grube secured funding from the Austrian Science Fund (FWF) in September 2023 for the project “4e Cognition in Theological Anthropology.” The project investigates how the findings of contemporary phenomenology and neurobiology (especially embodied intelligence) can inform a reorientation of Christian anthropology in light of its historical sources. In particular, Hoff and his team explore how the patristic concept of theosis (the deification of man) and Christian doctrines of salvation converge with 4e (embodied, embedded, enactive, extended) cognition. Hoff’s cooperation with the Institute for Information Systems & Society at the Vienna University of Economics and Business Administration is part of these efforts.

=== Performativity, Art, and Cultural Critique ===
Alongside his focus on digitization and anthropology, Hoff has written on the notion of performativity in Augustine, Dante, and the Renaissance, as well as Romanticism, modern avant-garde art, and collaborated with Christoph Schlingensief. He sees these performative and aesthetic dimensions as critical to understanding how truth unfolds as an event rather than a static given, requiring continual enactment and discernment in practice.

== Selected publications ==
=== Monographs ===
- Spiritualität und Sprachverlust. Theologie nach Foucault und Derrida. Schöningh: Paderborn, München, Zürich, 1999.
- Kontingenz, Berührung, Überschreitung. Zur philosophischen Propädeutik christlicher Mystik nach Nikolaus von Kues. Alber: Freiburg im Breisgau, 2007.
- The Analogical Turn: Rethinking Modernity with Nicholas of Cusa. Eerdmans: Grand Rapids, 2013. ISBN 978-0802868909
- Verteidigung des Heiligen. Anthropologie der Digitalen Transformation. Herder: Freiburg – Basel – Wien, 2021.

=== Edited publication ===
- Oliver Dürr; Johannes Hoff (eds.), Themenheft "Trinitarische Technikanthropologie", in: Zeitschrift für Theologie und Philosophie 147/1 (2025). doi:10.35070/ztp.v147i1.4250

=== Selected articles and book chapters ===
- Hoff, Johannes; Dürr, Oliver, „Umrisse einer trinitarischen Technikanthropologie.“ In: Theologie und Philosophie. Sonderheft Trinitarische Technikanthropologie 147/1 (2024), 7–43. doi:10.35070/ztp.v147i1.4251
- Hoff, Johannes (2025). “Enlightenment Now! Overcoming the Functional Cognitivism of the Kantian Tradition,” Philosophy, Theology and the Sciences 11, 181–207.
- Hoff, Johannes (2024). “The Gift of Intelligence and the Sacramentality of Real Presence. Overcoming the Dataist Metaphysics of Modern Cognitivism,” Modern Theology, 921–947.
- Hoff, Johannes (2024). “Can Scientific Agnosticism be Rational?: Idolatry and the 'Crisis of European Sciences' in the Age of the Digital Transformation.” In: Zeitschrift für Theologie und Philosophie 146/4, 575–608.
- Hoff, Johannes (2024). "Drinking the Clarity of Being: Beyond the Dataist Metaphysics of the Digital Age." In: Andreas Vonach (ed.), Anthropology in the Digital Age. Innsbruck: Innsbruck UP, 23–40.
- Sanayei, Amirhossein; Hoff, Johannes (2024). "Weisheit des Nichtwissens. Interview on Nicholas of Cusa (in Persian)." In: Humanities Review 3/4 (March), 1–22.
- Hoff, Johannes (2022). „Sakramentaler Realismus nach dem Ende des Gutenbergzeitalters. Christsein in einer postdigitalen Welt.“ In: Internationale Katholische Zeitschrift Communio 3/51, 238–260.
- Hoff, Johannes (2022). „Zur Wiederentdeckung des Heiligen. Theologie nach der digitalen Transformation.“ In: Freiburger Zeitschrift für Philosophie und Theologie 69/1, 122–150.
- Hoff, Johannes (2022). "Why we need Nicholas of Cusa after the Representationalist Delusion of Modern Philosophy and Theology." In: Moschini, Marco; Peroli, Enrico (eds.): Why we Need Cusanus / Warum wir Cusanus brauchen. Münster: Aschendorff, 91–120.
- Hoff, Johannes (2021). "Die kosmische Seinsfülle des großen Gegenüber. Anarchische Nachgedanken zu den heidnischen Duftnoten christlicher Rauchopfer." In: Ramb, Martin W.; Valentin, Joachim; Wucherpfennig, Ansgar; Zaborowski, Holger (eds.): Die anarchische Kraft des Monotheismus. Eckhard Nordhofens »Corpora« in der Diskussion. Freiburg i. Br. – Basel [u.a.]: Herder, 87–97.
- Hoff, Johannes (2020). "Digital Metrics in the Age of Online Culture Wars. Policies of Praise and the Quest for Democratisation." In: Freiburger Zeitschrift für Philosophie und Theologie 67/1, 135–148.
- Hoff, Johannes (2020). "Rückkehr zur Wirklichkeit. Wissenschaft und Spiritualität nach der Wiederentdeckung unserer leiblichen Existenz." In: Frey, Reiner (ed.): Meditation und die Zukunft der Bildung: Spiritualität und Wissenschaft. Weinheim: Beltz Juventa, 65–107.
- Hoff, Johannes (2020). "Transhumanismus als Symptom symbolischer Verelendung. Zur anthropologischen Herausforderung der Digitalen Revolution." In: Stephan Herzberg; Heinrich Watzka (eds.): Transhumanismus. Über die Grenzen technischer Selbstverbesserung. Berlin [u.a.]: De Gruyter, 221–254. doi:10.1515/9783110691047-013
