= Heythrop College, University of London =

Public research university in London, United Kingdom

Coordinates: 51°29′57.12″N 0°11′25.32″W

- Motto: Nil Sine Fide (Latin)
- Motto in English: "Nothing Without Faith"
- Type: Public linked to a 1614 Roman Catholic foundation (in Louvain, Belgium)
- Active: 1971–2018
- Affiliations: Cathedrals Group; University of London; Universities UK; IFCU
- Chancellor: The Princess Royal (University of London)
- Principal: Claire Ozanne (until 2019)
- Location: London, England
- Campus: Urban
Colours
- Website: www.heythrop.ac.uk

Heythrop College, University of London, was a constituent college of the University of London between 1971 and 2018, last located in Kensington Square, London. It comprised the university's specialist faculties of philosophy and theology while also having strengths in the social sciences. It offered undergraduate and postgraduate degree courses, and had five specialist institutes and centres to promote research.

The college had a close affiliation with the Roman Catholic Church, through the British Province of the Society of Jesus (Jesuits) whose scholarly tradition went back to a 1614 exiled foundation in Leuven, Belgium, and whose extensive library collections it housed. While maintaining its denominational links and ethos the college welcomed all faiths and perspectives, women as well as men.

Through Heythrop's close links with the Jesuits, it also served as the London centre for Fordham University, a Jesuit university in the United States. Other external groups, including A Call To Action (ACTA, British Catholic Association), also used meeting facilities on the site.

Following unsuccessful negotiations with St Mary's University, Twickenham, another British university, and amid some controversy, in June 2015 the college's governing body decided that the college would cease to be an independent constituent of the University of London in 2018. It formally terminated operations and left the University of London on 31 January 2019. It was the first significant UK higher education institution to completely close permanently (not including mergers and name changes) since the dissolution of the original University of Northampton in 1265.

== Twentieth-century name ==
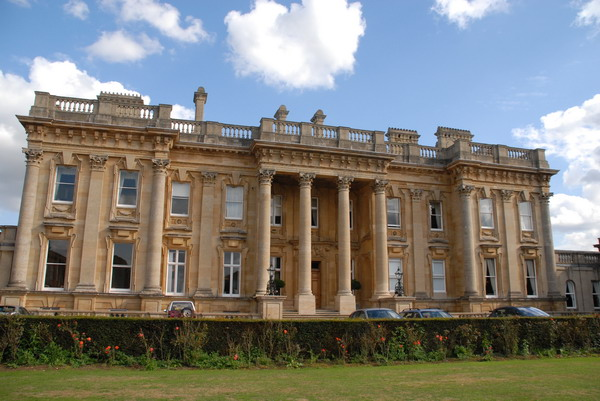
Heythrop Park, Oxfordshire, which gave its name to the college

The college acquired its name, Heythrop, from its 46 years at Heythrop Hall, a Grade II* listed early 18th-century country house in Italian Baroque style, 1 mile (1.6 km) southeast of Heythrop village in Oxfordshire. The English province of the Society of Jesus bought the dilapidated house and grounds in 1926 as a training centre for their scholastics. During its stay, the house was altered and enlarged, not always in a style sympathetic to the original architectural concept. In 1926 two wings were added to the north front built of Hornton ironstone from north Oxfordshire, much darker and browner than the stone used to build the original house in the 18th century.

In 1952, the indoor real tennis court was converted into a chapel and in 1965, a library was added. In 1960, two halls of residence were added in the grounds in contemporary style.

In 1970 the Jesuit province moved its facilities to London after it had negotiated for the centre's faculties of theology and philosophy to become part of London University. It sold its Oxfordshire estate to the National Westminster Bank Group which turned the house and its precincts into a training and conference centre.

== History ==
=== Beginnings in exile ===
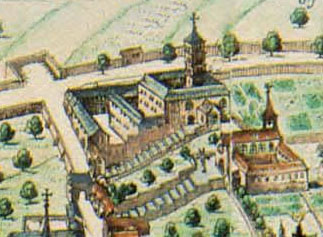
The English College in Liège, c. 1649

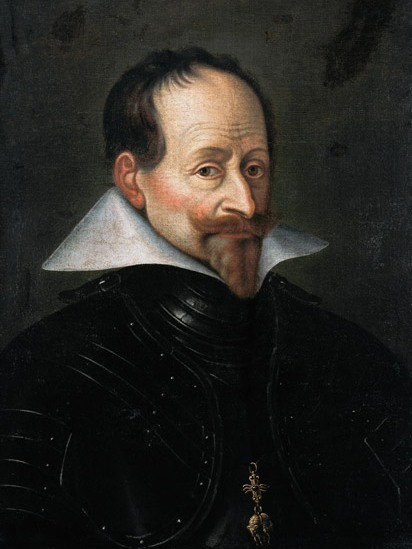
Maximilian I, Elector of Bavaria, Patron of the English Jesuit Faculties

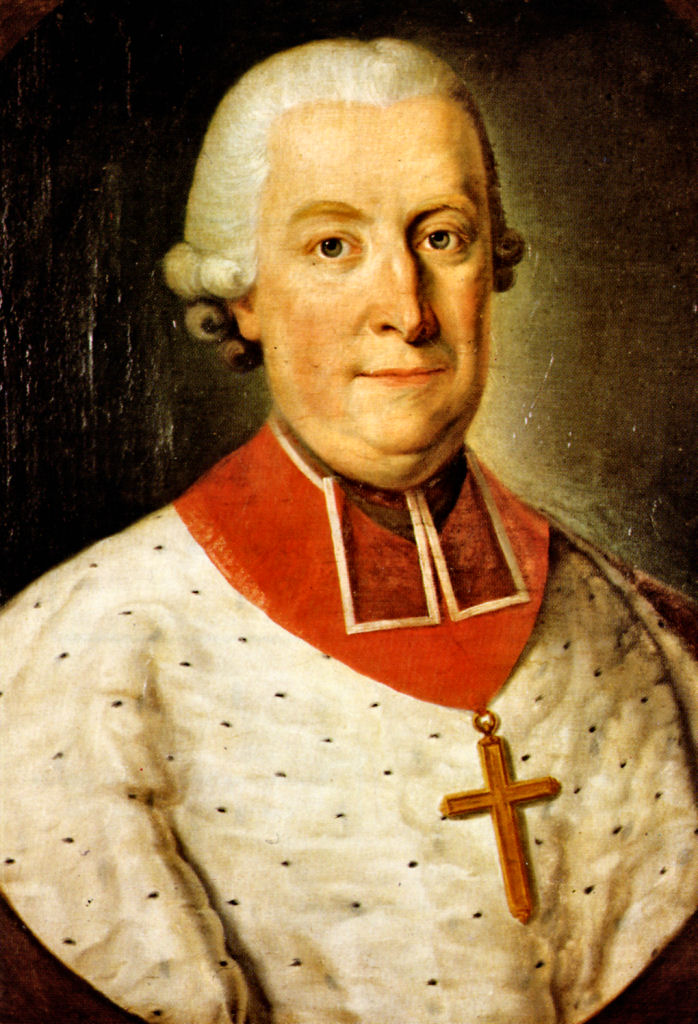
Bishop François-Charles de Velbrück

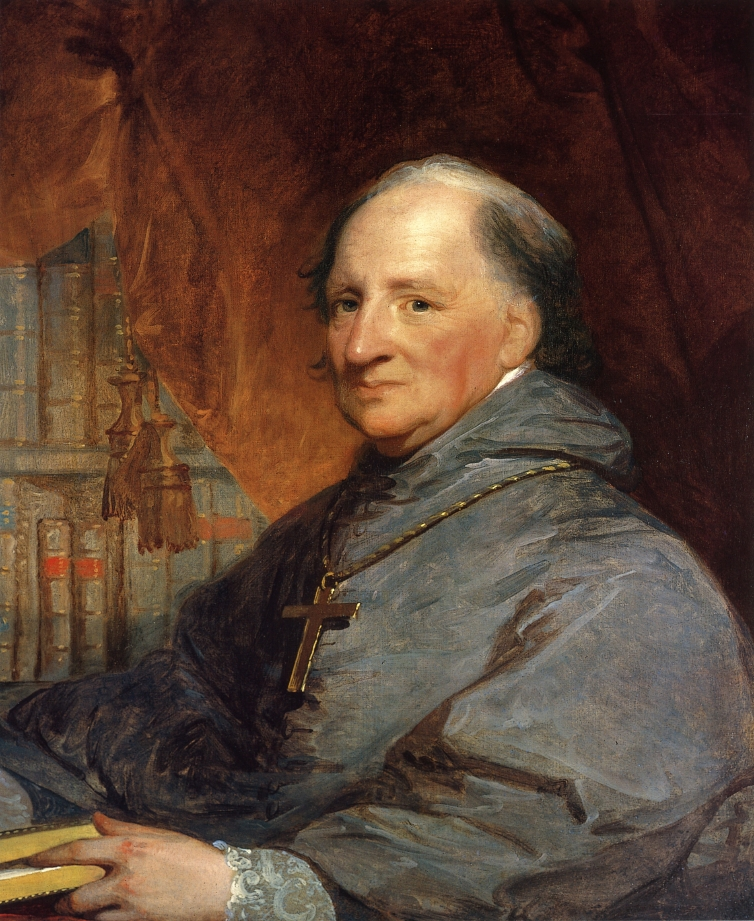
John Carroll

Due to continuing anti-Catholic persecution during the reign of James I, a network of English religious schools was established in Western Europe. Likewise the Society of Jesus preferred to establish its school for boys and its faculties of theology and philosophy for training English Jesuit candidates overseas. Under John Gerard it founded them in Leuven in 1614, before moving them to a newly constructed college in Liège in 1616, which became the Collège des Jésuites anglais (Liège). William Baldwin (1563–1632) was a professor of moral theology at the college in Louvain. He, like Gerard, was implicated in the Gunpowder Plot.

In 1624 the English Jesuit college obtained patronage from Maximilian I, Elector of Bavaria, and his wife, hence the colours of the elector's coat of arms were incorporated into its own coat of arms. The Liège college was protected in the Austrian Netherlands and continued relatively undisturbed for 178 years, through the suppression of the Society of Jesus in 1773 under the personal authority of Bishop François-Charles de Velbrück, until French troops surrounded the city in 1794. Notable teachers and alumni included:

- John Carroll (1735–1815), first Roman Catholic bishop (and Archbishop of Baltimore) in the United States and founder of Georgetown University
- Charles Carroll (1737–1832), Maryland delegate and one of the signatories of the Declaration of Independence
- Charles Plowden (1743–1821), Jesuit priest, writer and administrator; first rector at Stonyhurst
- Francis Plowden, Jesuit priest, barrister and writer. Taught at the college during the suppression of the Society of Jesus
- John Howard SJ was head of Liège College (1773–1783)
- William Strickland SJ was head of Liège College (1783–1790)
- Marmaduke Stone SJ (1748–1834), final director of the college (1790–1794), led the evacuation to England

=== Repatriation to England and Wales ===
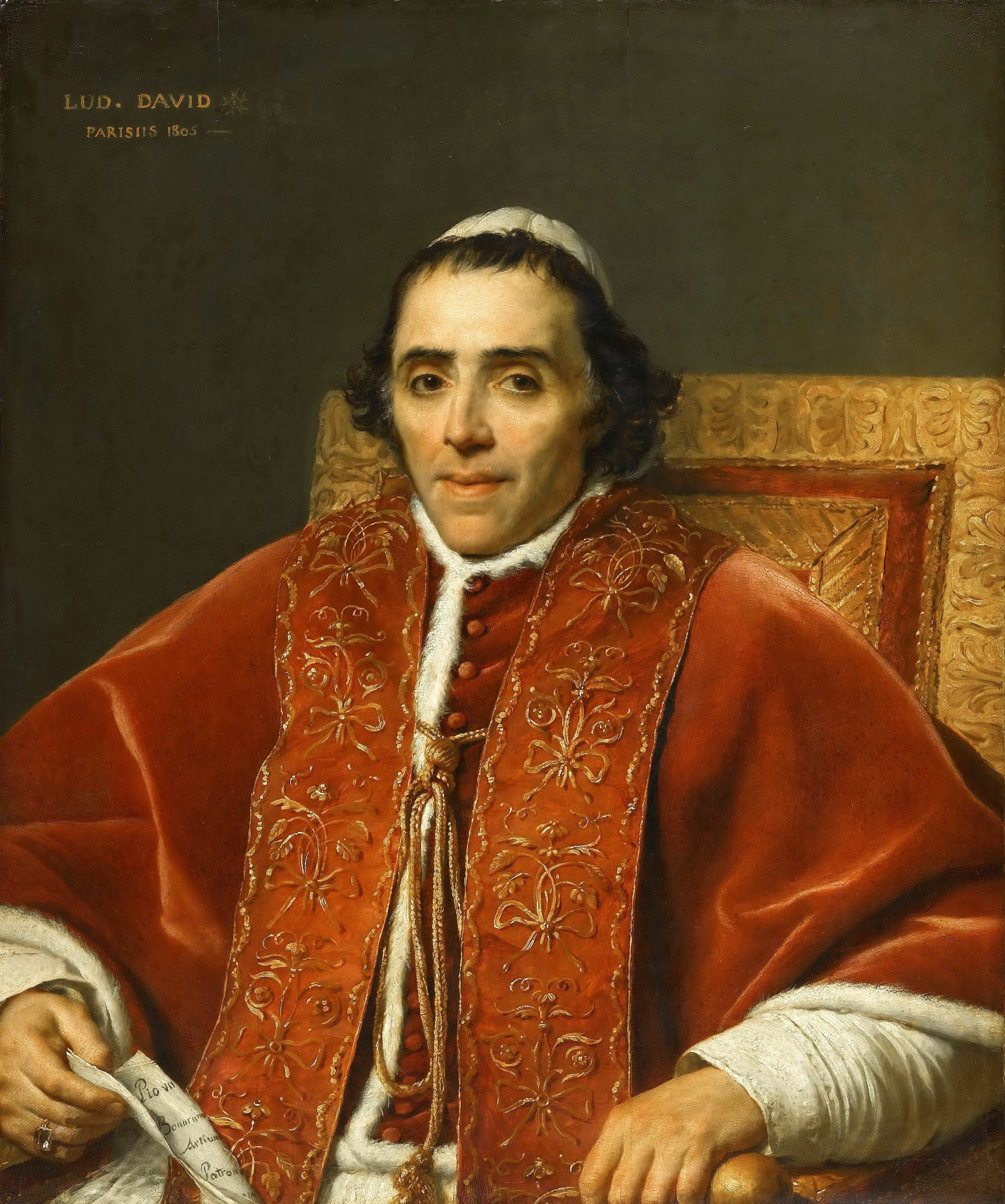
Pope Pius VII on return from Napoleonic exile lifted the ban on Jesuits in 1814

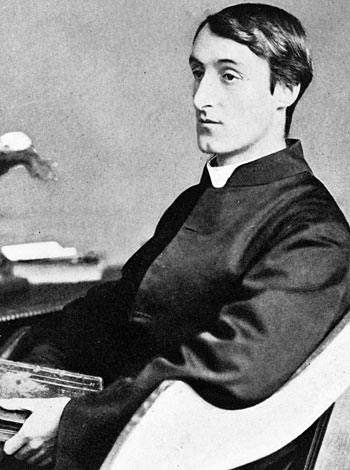
Gerard Manley Hopkins

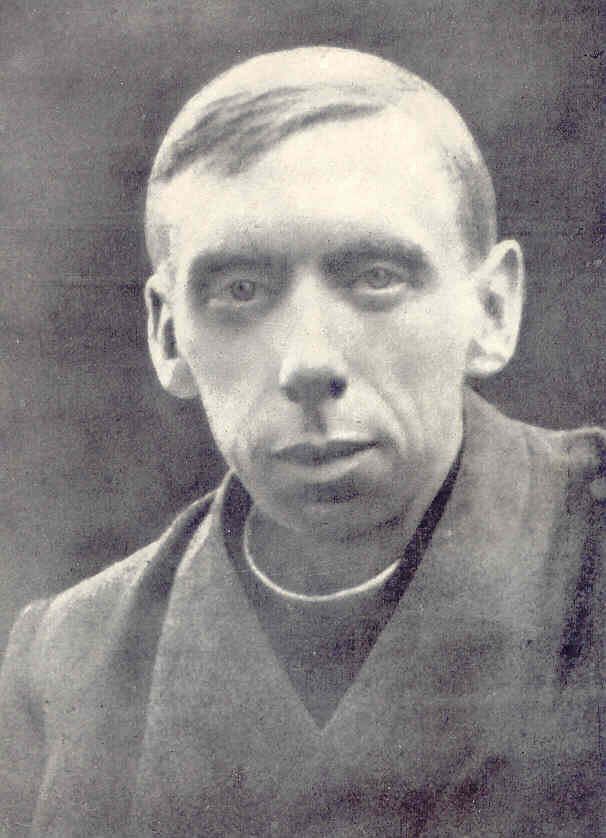
George Tyrrell

During the French Revolutionary Wars, the continuity of the college is owed principally to two men: Marmaduke Stone SJ, who led the Liège college move to England in 1794 and an Old Boy of Watten and Bruges English College, and Thomas Weld (of Lulworth), who generously donated his family seat, of Stonyhurst, a property in Lancashire, where the evacuees settled for the foreseeable future. While the environment in England was relatively benign for Catholics, the Catholic Church had suppressed the Jesuit order during the English province's exile in Europe. They resolved therefore to accept the authority of the only remaining valid Jesuit province which was in the Russian Empire under superiors, Gabriel Gruber and Tadeusz Brzozowski. The latter became Superior General of the Society of Jesus in 1814, although still confined to Russia, when Pope Pius VII lifted the ban on the order. The former Liège college staff located its faculties on two sites, philosophy at Stonyhurst College in Lancashire and theology at St Beuno's College in Denbighshire.

In 1840, Stonyhurst was recognised as an affiliated college of the University of London, which had been created in 1836. This allowed students to sit examinations for University of London degrees. Among the notable teaching staff were:

- Henry James Coleridge (1822–1893), professor of Scripture, religious preacher and writer
- Alfred Weld (1823–1890), professor of Science and Astronomy, Director of the Stonyhurst Observatory, grandson of the college founder
- Sylvester Joseph Hunter (1829–1896), Jesuit priest and educator
- John Morris (1826–1893) taught canon law in 1867
- George Tyrrell (1861–1909), an Irish Jesuit, taught philosophy at Stonyhurst (until his expulsion from the Jesuits) and was condemned for Modernism
- Franz Xavier Wernz (1842–1914), professor of canon law in 1882 at St Beuno's. He served as the 25th Superior General of the Society of Jesus and was rector of the Pontifical Gregorian University, Rome

Among its alumni were:

- James Brodrick (1891–1973), Jesuit priest and historian
- Richard Clarke (1839–1900), Jesuit priest and theologian. First Master of Campion Hall, Oxford
- Aloysius Cortie (1859–1925), Jesuit priest and astronomer
- Gerard Manley Hopkins (1844–1899), Jesuit priest, poet and professor
- Joseph Rickaby (1845–1932), Jesuit priest and philosopher
- Martin D'Arcy SJ (1888–1976) was a philosopher of love, and a correspondent, friend, and adviser of a range of literary and artistic figures including Evelyn Waugh, Dorothy L. Sayers, W. H. Auden, Eric Gill and Sir Edwin Lutyens. He has been described as "perhaps England's foremost Catholic public intellectual from the 1930s until his death".

=== Heythrop years ===
In 1926, the faculties came together at Heythrop Hall, Oxfordshire. As a Collegium Maximum, the college's right to admit its students to degrees was confirmed by the Holy See in 1932. In 1964, the college was raised to the status of a Pontifical Athenaeum, named as the Heythrop Faculties of Theology and Philosophy, open to lay men and women and clerics from outside the Society of Jesus. However, the college now also sought integration with the British educational system.

=== Rectors and principals, 1926–1970 ===
- 1926–1937: Edward Helsham SJ
- 1937–1944: Ignatius Scoles SJ
- 1944–1950: Edward Enright SJ
- 1950–1952: Desmond Boyle SJ
- 1952–1959: John Diamond SJ
- 1959–1964: David Hoy SJ
- 1964–1970: William Maher SJ

=== Alumni, 1926–1970 ===
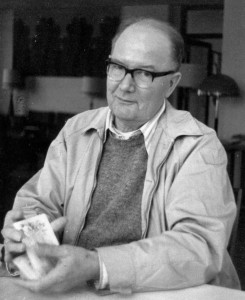
Bernard Lonergan SJ

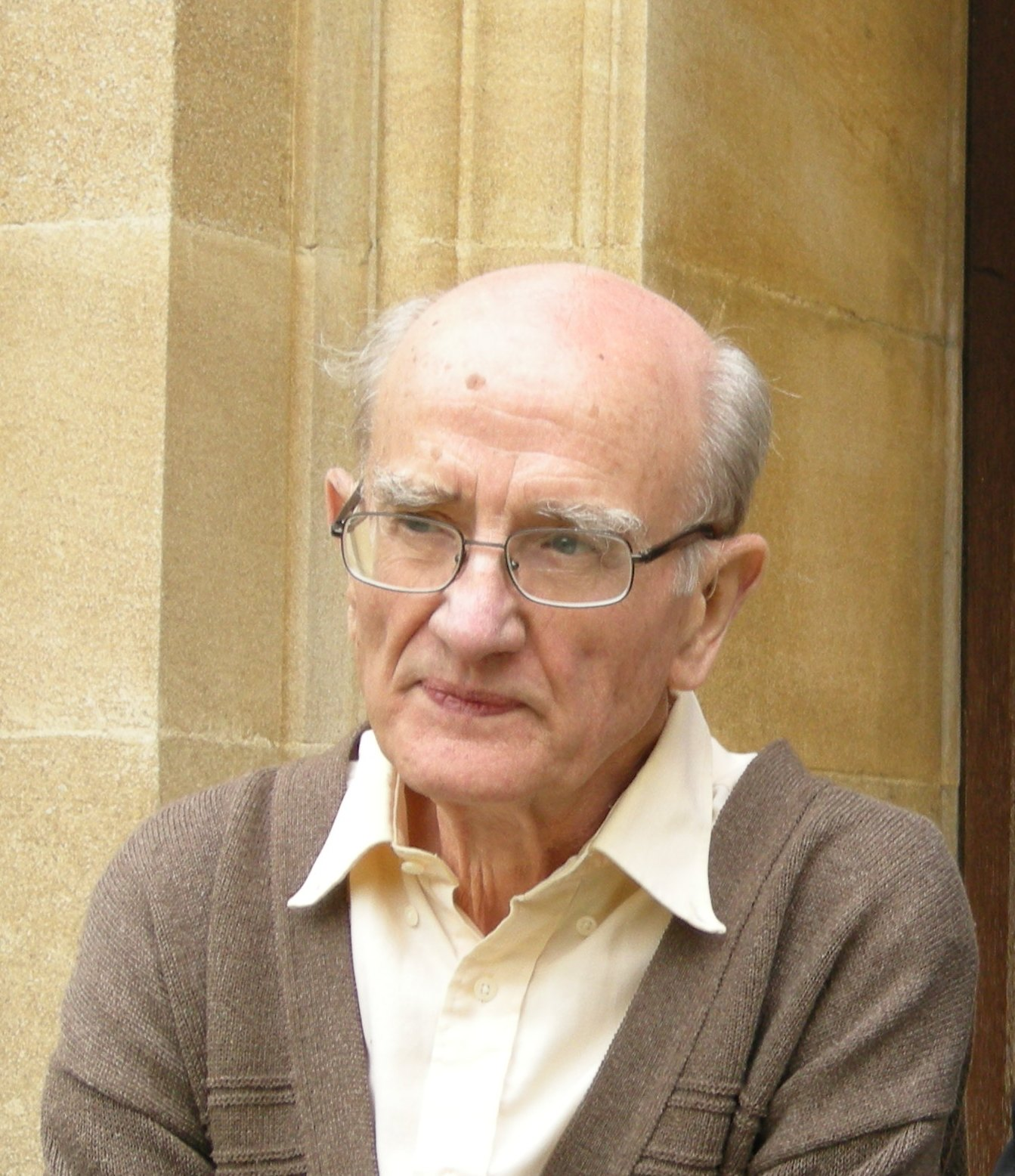
Joseph A. Munitiz SJ

- John A. Saliba, Jesuit priest and professor of religious studies
- Salvino Azzopardi (1931–2006), Jesuit priest and philosopher
- Frederick Copleston (1907–1994), Jesuit priest, philosopher and historian
- Ralph Coverdale (1918–1975), soldier, behavioural psychologist, management consultant and trainer
- Mark Elvins (1939–2014), Warden of Greyfriars, Oxford
- Clarence Gallagher, Jesuit priest and theologian. Former Dean of the Faculty of Canon Law and Rector of the Pontifical Oriental Institute (1990–1995).
- Gerard W. Hughes (1924–2014), Jesuit priest, spiritual guide and author of God of Surprises
- Paul Lakeland (1946– ), Professor and chair of the centre for Catholic studies of Fairfield University
- Peter Levi (1931–2000), former Jesuit priest, poet, archaeologist, travel writer, biographer, critic and Professor of Poetry at the University of Oxford
- Bernard Lonergan (1904–1984), Jesuit priest, philosopher and theologian
- Peter Milward (1925–2017), Jesuit priest and literary scholar
- Joseph A. Munitiz (1931–2022), Jesuit priest, theologian and librarian. Former editor of the Heythrop Journal and master of Campion Hall, Oxford
- Gerald O'Collins (1931–2024), Jesuit priest, author, academic, and educator
- Stephen Perry (1833–1889), Jesuit priest and astronomer
- James J. Quinn (1919–2010), Jesuit priest, theologian and hymnwriter
- Frederick Turner (1911–2001), Jesuit priest, archivist, librarian and former headmaster at Stonyhurst College
- Edward Yarnold (1926–2002), former Master of Campion Hall, Oxford from 1965 to 1972

== Constituent of the University of London ==
For this purpose it moved to London in 1970, and obtained a royal charter of incorporation as a "school" of the University of London in the faculties of theology and arts on 11 March 1971. It began to award University of London degrees. After its move to London, to a Grade II listed Georgian townhouse, a former convent, at nos. 11–13 Cavendish Square in the Marylebone area, the college retained the name "Heythrop College". In 1993 the college moved to its final location, in the Maria Assumpta Centre at 23 Kensington Square, initially sharing the site with several other organisations, most notably the Westminster Pastoral Foundation (WPF), a reputable and long-established counselling training institute. In 2000 Heythrop College announced it needed more space for its library and delicate negotiations began with WPF. The college had assembled one of the largest philosophy and theology-related libraries in Britain. Eight years later, WPF were finally persuaded to uproot and vacate their extensive purpose-built premises, about a quarter of the Maria Assumpta site.

In January 2014, the college received decrees from the Congregation for Catholic Education of the Holy See officially reactivating its ecclesiastical faculties under the patronage of saint Robert Bellarmine. These ecclesiastical faculties were grouped together as the Bellarmine Institute. In June 2014, Heythrop College celebrated the 400th anniversary of its two original faculties. While the college still retained the English Jesuits' original function of training future priests of the Catholic Church, its contemporary teaching staff and student body had become much wider, more international and diverse.

The college ran into financial difficulties in the 2010s due to the changes in higher education in the United Kingdom. Undergraduate student recruitment declined after the cap on tuition fees was raised to £9,000 per annum in 2012, resulting in the Society of Jesus subsidising the college with millions of pounds: Claire Ozanne, the college's final principal, also highlighted the impact of the administrative burden of quality assurance assessments such as the Teaching and Research Excellence Frameworks on small institutions like Heythrop. Despite explorations with other academies, strategic partnership talks with St Mary's University, Twickenham, and an offer from the University of Roehampton for Heythrop to affiliate as one of its constituent colleges, no solution was found and in 2015 the decision was made to wind down and close by 2019.

== Maria Assumpta campus ==
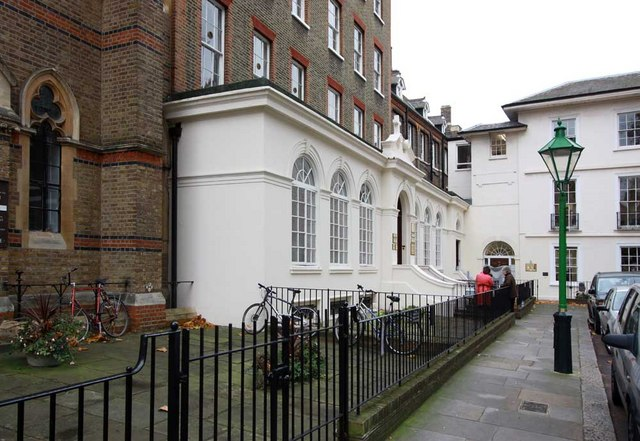
The Maria Assumpta Centre, left with the Marie Eugénie Chapel and Heythrop College to the right

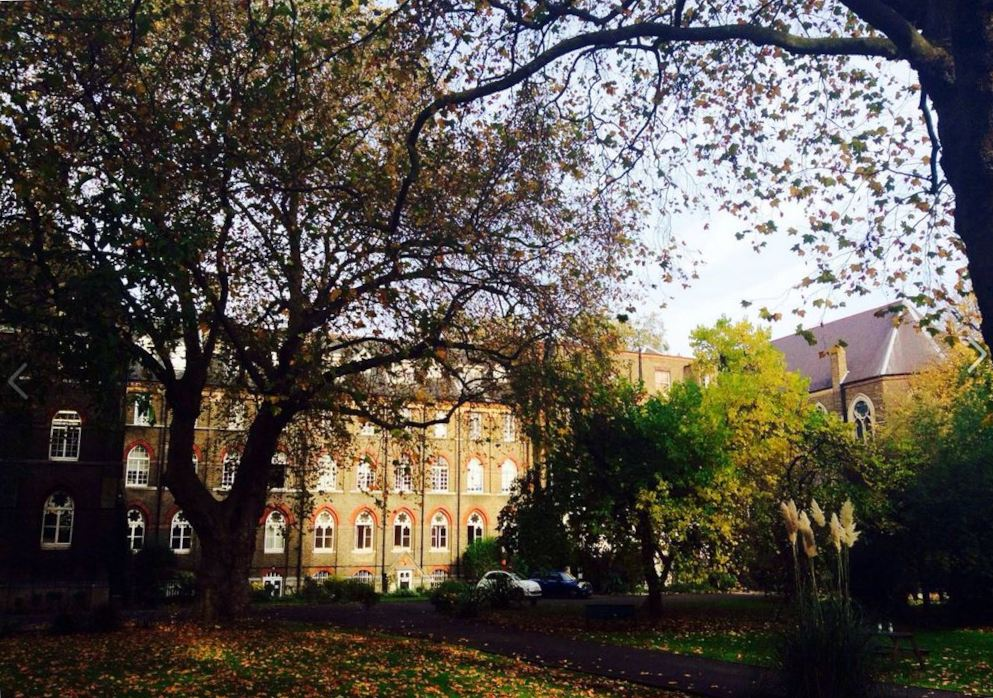
The Maria Assumpta gardens

The site was previously entirely owned by the Religious of the Assumption, a religious order of sisters founded in France by Saint Marie-Eugénie de Jésus. The Sisters originally ran a convent school and later a teacher training college on the mainly residential Victorian site, known for decades as The Maria Assumpta Centre. A number of the sisters continue to live on the site, and their Marie Eugénie Chapel was available for student use. A chaplaincy was provided for all College students, in addition to the University of London chaplaincy, along with an Islamic Prayer room.

Unlike many University of London colleges, Heythrop College managed in 2008, on the termination of their lease and the vacation of its premises by WPF, to take over the majority of facilities on the Maria Assumpta Kensington site. All lecture rooms, the students' union, the dining hall, previously shared with WPF and other tenant organisations, in the Victorian buildings in Kensington Square, came under its exclusive management. The college also took over the Alban Hall of residence, previously operated by the Sisters for women students only, which became briefly the college's sole residential accommodation for a proportion of its selected student body.

=== Library ===
The college library's 180,000 volumes made it one of the largest theology and philosophy libraries in the United Kingdom. Some of its collections date back to the founding of the faculties in 1614. Between 2008 and 2018, the collections were housed in two buildings: the theology, social sciences and literature collections were held in the Copleston Wing of the college, formerly the main part of the WPF Training Centre, while philosophy collections were held in the Maria Assumpta Library in the main building. Heythrop held many of its more precious volumes outside London, in the college repository in Egham, Surrey. It had a large and important collection of pre-1801 books, such as Edward Baddeley's collections and a first edition of Isaac Newton's Opticks. Heythrop students were also able to access the Senate House Library, and the libraries of other colleges of the university due to the college's special status.

Between 2018 and April 2025 the library's collections had also been available through the Senate House Library.. The collection is still owned by the Jesuits in Britain, and most of the collection is made available through the Heythrop Library reading room at the London Jesuit Centre. The earliest printed books have been deposited at Campion Hall, Oxford.

== Academic profile ==
Heythrop prepared students for a range of specialist taught and research degrees. The college had five specialist institutes and centres which promoted research, conferences and a variety of educational outreach activities. These were the:

- Centre for Christianity and Inter-religious Dialogue
- Centre for Eastern Christianity
- Centre for Philosophy of Religion
- Religious Life Institute
- Heythrop Institute for Religion and Society

All of the institutes conducted research in their own field.

The college offered full-time, and part-time courses through a combination of lectures, seminars and tutorials, including one-to-one tutorials.

The college had a growing research profile in its final years. It participated in the most recent Research Excellence Framework (2014) and gained considerable recognition for its research. The combined results for all elements of the REF placed Heythrop at 16th in the overall ranking for the Theology & Religious Studies unit of assessment. Overall, 22% of its research outputs was deemed world-leading and a further 40% was deemed internationally excellent. The research works recognised in its submission reflected efforts in both its Theology and Philosophy departments.

=== Department of Philosophy ===
The department offered a variety of specialist philosophy degrees with students attached to one of the Centres at the college, embracing both the continental and analytic traditions, and the history of philosophy.

=== Department of Theology ===
In addition to theology, religious studies and ethics, Heythrop said it was the first college in the world to offer undergraduate and postgraduate degree courses focused on the Abrahamic Religions led by members of each of the three Abrahamic faiths. The Theology department also offered a Divinity programme to candidates for the Catholic priesthood, making it a centre of Roman Catholic training and learning in the United Kingdom.

=== Pastoral and social studies ===
The college had a distinctive history and range of teaching in pastoral theology and allied disciplines, with a profile in the United Kingdom and internationally. The Pastoral and Social Studies Department offered degree programmes in the following fields: pastoral theology and practical theology, including:

- Sociology of religion
- Christian spirituality
- Ethics
- Liturgy
- Canon law and psychology, including a specialism in the psychology of religion.

=== Bellarmine Institute ===
The Bellarmine Institute, named after St Robert Bellarmine, was the new name given to the Heythrop ecclesiastical Faculties of Theology and Philosophy in 2013. After moving to London and becoming established as a constituent college of the University of London, the Faculties had become dormant. They were reactivated on 17 September 2013 by a decree of the Congregation for Catholic Education of the Holy See, expanding the opportunities and teaching the college could offer to seminarians, priestly candidates and others. Before the closure of the college, it had been announced that the Society of Jesus, the college governors and the Archbishop of Westminster would look for ways for the ecclesiastical faculties to continue.

The institute offered degree programmes in theology and philosophy, intended for Catholic ordinands, those already engaged in church ministry and other scholars. The ecclesiastical degree programmes offered covered all three cycles for priestly formation in the Catholic Church.

- Baccalaureate in Sacred Theology (STB)
- Licentiate in Sacred Theology (STL)
- Doctor of Sacred Theology (STD)
- Baccalaureate in Philosophy (BacPhil)
- Licentiate in Philosophy (PhL)
- Doctor of Philosophy (PhD)

In July 2019 both faculties were transferred to St Mary's University Twickenham and renamed Mater Ecclesiae College.

=== Public lectures ===
The college hosted a number of free public lectures, research seminars and study days throughout the year on a variety of philosophical and theological topics. Concurrently, Heythrop ran a number of paid events that were open to the general public.

Heythrop College ran the Loschert Lecture, a lecture series delivered by eminent philosophers, theologians and people of faith. The series was intended to reflect from a consciously Christian perspective, on significant social, political and ethical issues in society. The series was named after William Loschert, chairman of the trustees of the London Centre of Fordham University, who donated the funding for the lectures. Lecturers included Charles Margrave Taylor, Baroness Scotland, Peter Sutherland and David Brennan.

=== The Heythrop Journal ===
Heythrop College sponsored The Heythrop Journal, an international philosophy and theology academic journal. Published on a bimonthly basis, The Heythrop Journal was founded in 1960 by Bruno Brinkman as a format for research on the relational dialogue between philosophy and theology. Still retaining this original function, the current editor is Philip Moller; As of 2026, the journal continues to be published.

=== Student activities ===
Apart from its students' union, Heythrop's students established their in-house newspaper, The Lion, in 2010. It won the NUS "Best Student Media" award in 2011. In 2015, The Lion ceased publication.

== Closure ==
In September 2013, Heythrop College announced that it would stop recruiting undergraduates for University of London degrees, noting its then discussions about a "strategic partnership" with St Mary's University, Twickenham. The initiative was attributed to financial difficulties the college faced as an autonomous college of the University of London. Accordingly, the number of students dropped from 700 in the academic year 2014/15 and 560 in 2015/16 to 425 in 2016/17 and 200 in 2017/18. In June 2017 it was confirmed that the college would close in October 2018, with no plans to transfer any departments or continue elsewhere. Heythrop ultimately closed at the end of the 2017/18 academic year, with the final graduations taking place at Senate House on 12 December 2018. From 1 August 2017, the University of London took over the academic supervision previously granted by Heythrop College for the Bachelor of Divinity and related Diploma and Certificate of Higher Education programmes offered through the University of London (Worldwide) and housed within the department of theology and religious studies at King’s College London. The degree was withdrawn by 2026.

The college site was sold, with some of the proceeds reverting to the Religious of the Assumption. An application was made for planning permission to redevelop it as a luxury retirement complex, but this was refused by the Mayor of London. As of 2026, the former college campus was available for hire as a location or production space for the film and television industry.

== Notable people ==
=== Notable faculty, 1971–2019 ===
- Elizabeth Burns, lecturer in philosophy of religion
- Brendan Callaghan SJ principal 1985–1997, 1998–1999
- Alan Carter, head of the philosophy department
- Dan Cohn-Sherbok, visiting research fellow
- Frederick Copleston (1907–1994) SJ principal 1970–1974
- John Cottingham, professorial research fellow
- Johannes Hoff, professor of systematic theology
- Michael Holman SJ principal 2010–2017
- Kevin T. Kelly, lecturer in moral theology
- Stephen Law, reader in philosophy
- John Mahoney (1931–2024) SJ principal 1976–1981

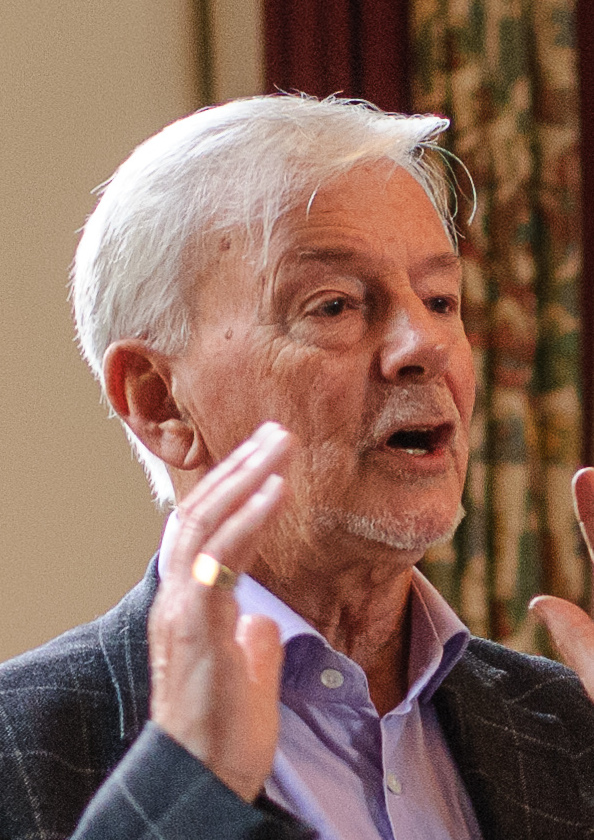
Keith Ward

- Robert Murray SJ (1926–2018), scholar of Syriac
- Claire Ozanne principal 2017–2019
- Martyn Percy, professorial research fellow
- Philip Sheldrake, religious historian and theologian. Moulsdale Professorial fellow, University of Durham
- Janet Soskice, philosophy of religion and ethics
- George Stack, governor of the college
- Peter Vardy, vice-principal and senior lecturer in philosophy
- Keith Ward, professorial research fellow. Former Regius Professor of Divinity at Oxford

=== Notable alumni ===
have included:

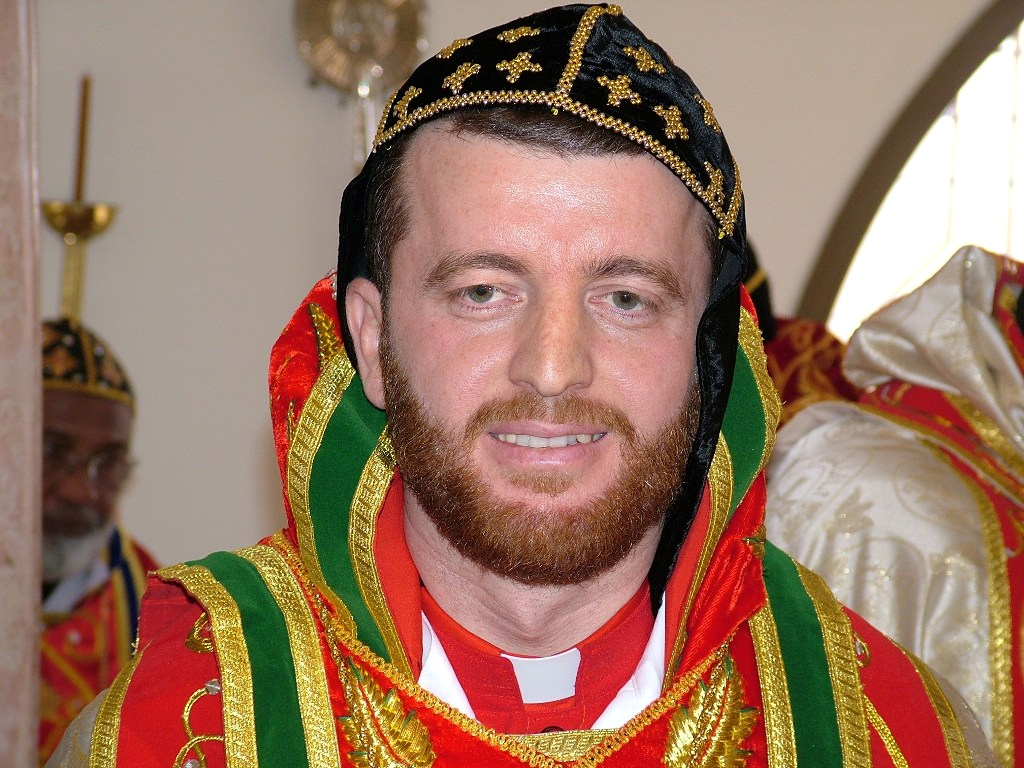
Polycarpus Augin Aydin

- Polycarpus Augin Aydin (born 1971), Metropolitan and Patriarchal Vicar for the Archdiocese of the Netherlands of the Syriac Orthodox Church

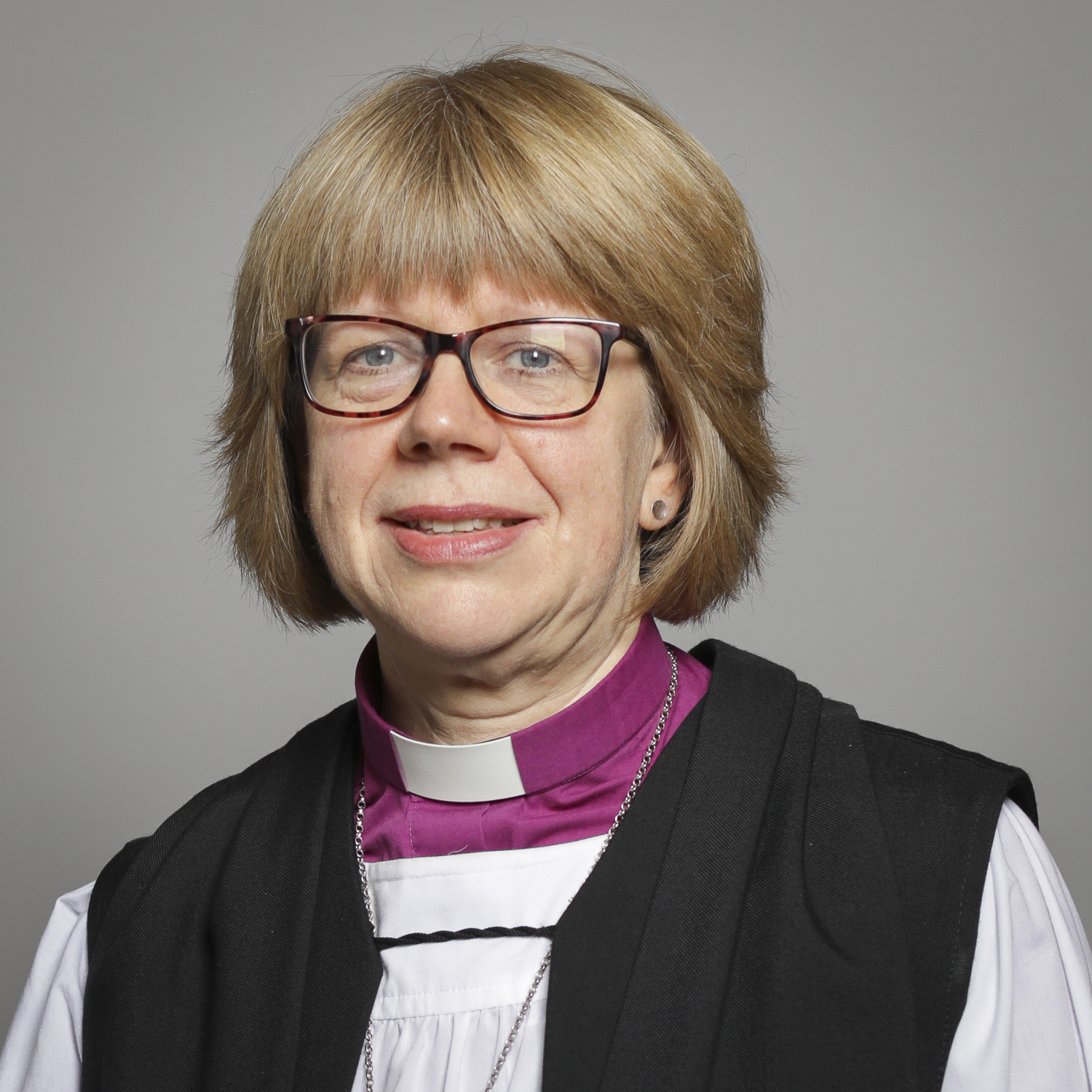
Sarah Mullally

- William Bentinck, Viscount Woodstock (born 1984), writer, social entrepreneur and heir to the Earldom of Portland
- Joseph Buttigieg (1947–2019), scholar, teacher
- Brendan Callaghan (born 1948), Jesuit priest and psychologist
- Bernt Ivar Eidsvig (born 1953), Roman Catholic Bishop of Oslo
- Michael Charles Evans (1951–2011), Roman Catholic Bishop of East Anglia
- Charles Jason Gordon, Roman Catholic priest, appointed Archbishop of Port of Spain in 2017
- Sebastian Gorka (born 1970), former adviser to Viktor Orbán and Deputy Assistant to President Donald Trump
- Robert Hannigan (born 1965), Director of GCHQ (2014–2017)
- Matt Malone, S.J., Jesuit priest and current editor-in-chief of America Magazine
- John Anthony McGuckin (born 1952), Orthodox Christian priest, academic and poet
- David William Parry (born 1958), pastor, poet and dramaturge
- Malcolm Patrick McMahon (born 1949), Roman Catholic Archbishop of Liverpool formerly Bishop of Nottingham
- Michael Anthony Moxon (1942–2019), Anglican Dean of Truro Cathedral
- Dame Sarah Mullally, Anglican Bishop of London (2018-26) and Archbishop of Canterbury since 2026
- Martin Newland (born 1961), journalist and editor of The National
- Catherine Pepinster (1959– ), editor and writer on religion
- Keith Riglin (1957–2023), Anglican Bishop of Argyll and The Isles
- Lindsay Urwin (born 1956), Anglican Bishop of Horsham
- Dominic Walker (born 1948), former Anglican Bishop of Reading and Bishop of Monmouth
- Alan Williams, Roman Catholic Bishop of Brentwood
- Dame Rachel de Souza née Kenny (born 1968), Children's Commissioner for England.

== See also ==
- Campion Hall, Oxford
- Campion House
- Colleges of St Omer, Bruges and Liège
- Heythrop Library
- Jesuit universities
- Jesuit University System
- Parkstead House
- Pontifical university
- List of Jesuit sites
- List of University of London people
- St Michael and St John Church, Clitheroe
