= The Heythrop Journal =

- Discipline: Philosophy and Theology
- Language: English
- Edited by: Patrick Madigan

Publication details
- History: 1960 to present
- Publisher: Wiley-Blackwell for Jesuits in Britain (United Kingdom)
- Frequency: Bimonthly

Standard abbreviations
- ISO 4: Heythrop J.

Indexing
- ISSN: 1468-2265

Links
- Journal homepage

The Heythrop Journal is a bimonthly peer-reviewed academic journal covering the relations between philosophy and theology. The journal is published by Wiley-Blackwell and was sponsored by Heythrop College (London). With the closure of Heythrop College the journal moved to Campion Hall, Oxford and is sponsored by the Society of Jesus in Britain. The journal was established in 1960 by Bruno Brinkman SJ. The editor-in-chief is Patrick Madigan SJ (Campion Hall, Oxford).

== Abstracting and indexing ==
The journal is abstracted and indexed in:

- Academic Search
- Arts and Humanities Citation Index
- ATLA Catholic Periodical & Literature Index
- Current Contents/Arts & Humanities
- International Bibliography of Periodical Literature
- Philosopher's Index
- PhilPapers
- POIESIS
