= John A. Saliba =

Professor and researcher in the new religious movements

John A. Saliba is a Maltese-born Jesuit priest, a professor of religious studies at the University of Detroit Mercy and a noted writer and researcher in the field of new religious movements.

Saliba has advocated a conciliatory approach towards new religions. He has argued that membership in such movements can serve as a temporary haven for young adults in a formative stage of their lives, and is not necessarily detrimental. He has been critical of the brainwashing concept espoused by the anti-cult movement.

== Life and academic career ==
Saliba has been teaching at the University of Detroit Mercy since 1970. Born and raised in Malta, he studied philosophy and theology at Heythrop College before it was affiliated to the University of London and anthropology at the University of Oxford, and completed his doctorate in Religion and Religious Education at the Catholic University of America in Washington, DC. Saliba is a Roman Catholic priest and a member of the Society of Jesus (Jesuits). His main teaching focus has been on comparative religion, and his research and publications have mostly been about new religious movements. He presently teaches courses in world religions, anthropology of religion and new religious movements as professor of religious studies at the University of Detroit Mercy. Saliba also contributed to a three-year study of new religions for the Vatican, conducted by the International Federation of Catholic Universities.

== Views ==
In Understanding New Religious Movements (2003), Saliba advocated a conciliatory approach towards new religions: "Whatever critiques of new religions must be rendered by scholars of various disciplines, dialogue is a more useful response than diatribe". He expressed the view that "all that the heated denunciations of the new religions do is to reinforce the attitudes and beliefs of both their members and detractors. Apologetic debates rarely lead unbelievers or apostates to convert; they do not succeed in persuading renegade Christians to abandon their new beliefs to return to the faith of their birth. Harangues against the new religions do not lead their members to listen attentively to the arguments of zealous evangelizers. On the contrary, they drive them further away and elicit similar belligerent responses."

In Saliba's view, new religious movements should actually be treated as forms of religion, much like those that have arisen at all times throughout history, rather than as "cults" or a social problem specific to recent decades. Noting that new religions often appeal to young people who lack spiritual grounding, he has argued that involvement in such movements is not necessarily a dangerous distraction from the path to adulthood, but can also serve as a temporary haven in a materialistic and selfish society, providing "an alternative therapy to many young adults as they are faced with making momentous decisions at important junctures in their lives". He has stated that many members of new religions appear to be healthy and happy, and that in many cases they move away from alcohol and drug use, gaining "a degree of intellectual security, emotional stability and organised behavioural patterns that contrast sharply with their previously confused and chaotic existences". He also contends, based on statistical studies, that the appeal of new religious movements is often short-lived, with over 90% of members moving on within two years of joining. Given that new religions appear to fulfill a need that the mainstream churches are unable to address, he states that there is a need for "some soul-searching on the part of the mainline churches".

Saliba is critical of the anti-cult movement and has remarked that "the neutral stance of the social sciences is a stance which has often been interpreted as favoring the NRMs". In 1985, Saliba published a two-part critique of Margaret Singer, a key proponent of the brainwashing hypothesis prevalent at the time, in the American Psychology Bulletin, finding numerous faults with the documentation and conclusions of her research. He criticized her sources – deprogrammed ex-members and their friends and families – arguing that they lacked impartiality and objectivity and did not form a representative or statistically significant sample. He maintained that Singer lacked relevant academic background or even interest in the study of religion, and that she failed to consider the possibility that new religious movements might have a genuine religious or spiritual dimension. He thought that she was unaware of legitimate forms of Eastern religion, as evidenced by her including Zen Buddhism in a list of cults, and that she generally took a far too negative view of new religious movements.

Commenting in Anti-cult Movements in Cross Cultural Perspective on the Vatican's doctrine on new religious movements disseminated in 1991 – which according to Janet L. Jacobs writing in the academic journal Sociology of Religion "walks a fine line between condemning the new religions and recognizing the importance of religious freedom" – Saliba expressed the view that the Pontifical Council for Interreligious Dialogue "respects the religious freedom of individuals, even though their choices are deemed doctrinally erroneous and their behavior morally unacceptable."

== Reception ==
Mary F. Bednarowski, reviewing Saliba's Understanding New Religious Movements in the Journal of Ecumenical Studies, described the book as "a significant contribution to conversations about this too-frequently-contentious subject", noting that "the author attributes to the study of new religions the complexity it deserves" and that "his overall contention is that it is more profitable to study new religions constructively than belligerently. New religions, says Saliba, should be looked upon as 'both partners and rivals in the religious quest'." She said she had used the book in one of her own courses on new religious movements and "found it very helpful for the background it offers, the multiplicity of perspectives and methodological approaches it engages, and its exploratory and nondefensive tone."

== Publications ==
=== Books ===
- "Homo religiosus" in Mircea Eliade: An Anthropological Evaluation, Brill Academic Publishers 1976, ISBN 978-90-04-04550-7
- Psychiatry and the Cults: An Annotated Bibliography, Garland Pub. 1987, ISBN 978-0-8240-8586-5
- Social Science and the Cults: An Annotated Bibliography, Garland Pub. 1990, ISBN 978-0-8240-3719-2
- Perspectives on New Religious Movements, Geoffrey Chapman 1995, ISBN 978-0-225-66786-8
- Christian Responses to the New Age Movement, Geoffrey Chapman 1999, ISBN 978-0-225-66852-0
- Understanding New Religious Movements, Rowman Altamira 2003, ISBN 978-0-7591-0356-6 (with J. Gordon Melton)

=== Book chapters and articles ===
- "The Guru: Perceptions of American Devotees of the Divine Light Mission", Horizons, Volumes 7–8, College Theology Society, 1980, pp. 69–82
- "The Christian Response to the New Religions: A Critical Look at the Spiritual Counterfeits Project," Journal of Ecumenical Studies 18, 3 (Summer 1981), pp. 451–473.
- "Psychiatry and the New Cults", Parts I and II, American Psychology Bulletin, Spring, 1985, and Winter, 1985, pp. 39–55 and 361–375
- "Christian and Jewish Responses to ISKCON", ISCKON Review 2 (1986), pp. 76–103
- "Dialogue with ISCKON: A Roman Catholic Perspective", ISKCON Communications Journal 4,2 (1996), pp. 1–16
- "The Earth is a Dangerous Place – The World View of the Aetherius Society", Marburg Journal of Religion, 1999
- "The Psychology of UFO Phenomena", in: Partridge, Christopher Hugh (ed.). UFO Religions, Routledge 2003, ISBN 978-0-415-26324-5
- "UFOs and Religion: A Case Study of Unarius Academy of Science", in: Lewis, James R. (ed.). The Encyclopedic Sourcebook of UFO Religions, Prometheus Books 2003, ISBN 978-1-57392-964-6
- "Psychology and the New Religious Movements", in: Lewis, James R. (ed.). The Oxford Handbook of New Religious Movements. Oxford University Press 2004, ISBN 0-19-514986-6
- "A Christian Response to the New Age", in: Lewis, James R. (ed.). The Encyclopedic Sourcebook of New Age Religions, Prometheus Books 2004, ISBN 978-1-59102-040-0
