= Philip Sheldrake =

Philip Sheldrake FRSA FRHistS is a religious historian and theologian with additional background in philosophy and political theory. He was educated at St Peter's School, Southbourne, Bournemouth (1954–1964), an independent preparatory and secondary boarding and day school run by the De La Salle Brothers. His main work has been as a leading scholar in the overall multi-disciplinary field of spirituality. In particular, Philip Sheldrake has been closely involved internationally in the emergence of Christian Spirituality as an academic discipline.

Sheldrake is a past president of the international Society for the Study of Christian Spirituality, linked to the American Academy of Religion (AAR).

== Career ==
Sheldrake originally trained in history, philosophy, and then theology at the University of Oxford and the University of London. He was also a member of the Jesuits (a Roman Catholic religious order) for some thirty years. Sheldrake taught at the University of London (1984–94) where he was also co-director and then director of the Institute of Spirituality at Heythrop College. He later taught at the University of Cambridge (1992–97), Durham University (as William Leech Professorial Fellow 2003–08) and as honorary professor and postgraduate research supervisor at the University of Wales Lampeter (1998–2013). He was also the Hulsean Lecturer at the University of Cambridge (1999–2000) and an honorary research fellow of the Centre for the Study of Cities & Regions, Durham University (2008–2013).

Sheldrake is a Fellow of the Royal Society of Arts (FRSA) and a Fellow of the Royal Historical Society (FRHistS). In 2015 he was awarded the higher doctorate, Doctor of Divinity (DD), by Oxford University after formal examination of a portfolio of his published work. He is currently senior research associate of the Von Hugel Institute at St Edmund's College, University of Cambridge, senior research fellow in the Cambridge Theological Federation and professor, Senior Fellow and Research Director of the Institute for the Study of Contemporary Spirituality at the graduate Oblate School of Theology, San Antonio Texas. He also remains a Professorial Fellow of St Chad's College, Durham University and has been research fellow in the Global Cities Initiative at Georgetown University, Washington DC. He has regularly been a visiting professor or consultant at a number of other universities in the United States, for example as The Joseph Visiting Professor of Catholic Studies at Boston College (2008–09).

== Selected works ==
=== Books ===
- Sheldrake, Philip (1998). Spirituality and history: Questions of interpretation and method. Maryknoll, NY: Orbis Books. ISBN 1-57075-203-6.
- Sheldrake, Philip (1995). Living Between Worlds: Place and Journey in Celtic Christianity. London: Darton, Longman & Todd. ISBN 0-232-52119-0.
- Sheldrake, Philip (1999). Spirituality and Theology: Christian Living and the Doctrine of God. Maryknoll, NY: Orbis Books. ISBN 1-57075-224-9.
- Sheldrake, Philip (2001). Spaces for the Sacred: Place, Memory, and Identity. Baltimore, MD: Johns Hopkins University Press. ISBN 0-8018-6861-0.
- Sheldrake, Philip (2005). The new Westminster dictionary of Christian spirituality. Louisville, Kentucky: Westminster John Knox. ISBN 0-664-23003-2.
- Sheldrake, Philip (2006). Spirituality: A Brief History. Wiley-Blackwell. ISBN 1-4051-1771-0.
- Sheldrake, Philip (2009). Heaven in Ordinary: A George Herbert Reader. London: Canterbury Press.
- Sheldrake, Philip (2010). Explorations in Spirituality: History, Theology and Social Practice. New York: Paulist Press.
- Sheldrake, Philip (2012). Spirituality: A Very Short Introduction. Oxford: Oxford University Press.
- Sheldrake, Philip (2014). Spirituality: A Guide for the Perplexed. London: Bloomsbury.
- Sheldrake, Philip (2014). The Spiritual City: Theology, Spirituality & the Urban. Oxford: Wiley-Blackwell.
- Sheldrake, Philip (3rd revised edition 2016). Befriending Our Desires. Collegeville: Liturgical Press.
- Sheldrake, Philip (2018). Editor, Surrender to Christ for Mission: French Spiritual Traditions. Collegeville: Liturgical Press
- Sheldrake, Philip (2019). Julian of Norwich - in God's Sight: Her Theology in Context. Oxford: Wiley-Blackwell.
- Sheldrake, Philip (2019). The Spiritual Way: Classic Traditions and Contemporary Practice. Collegeville: Liturgical Press
- Sheldrake, Philip (2022). A World Transfigured: The Mystical Journey. Collegeville: Liturgical Press
- Sheldrake, Philip (2024). Civility: Cultivating Public Virtues. Oxford: Oxford University Press

=== Articles ===
- Philip Sheldrake (1999). "The study of spirituality". The Way: a review of Christian spirituality. 39 (2). The Way Publications: 162–172. ISSN 0043-1575.
- Philip Sheldrake (2011). "Spirituality in a European context". Spiritus: A Journal of Christian Spirituality. 11 (1). Johns Hopkins University Press: 1–9. doi:10.1353/scs.2011.0020. ISSN 1533-1709.
