= Campion Hall, Oxford =

Constituent educational institution of the University of Oxford

Campion Hall
- University of Oxford
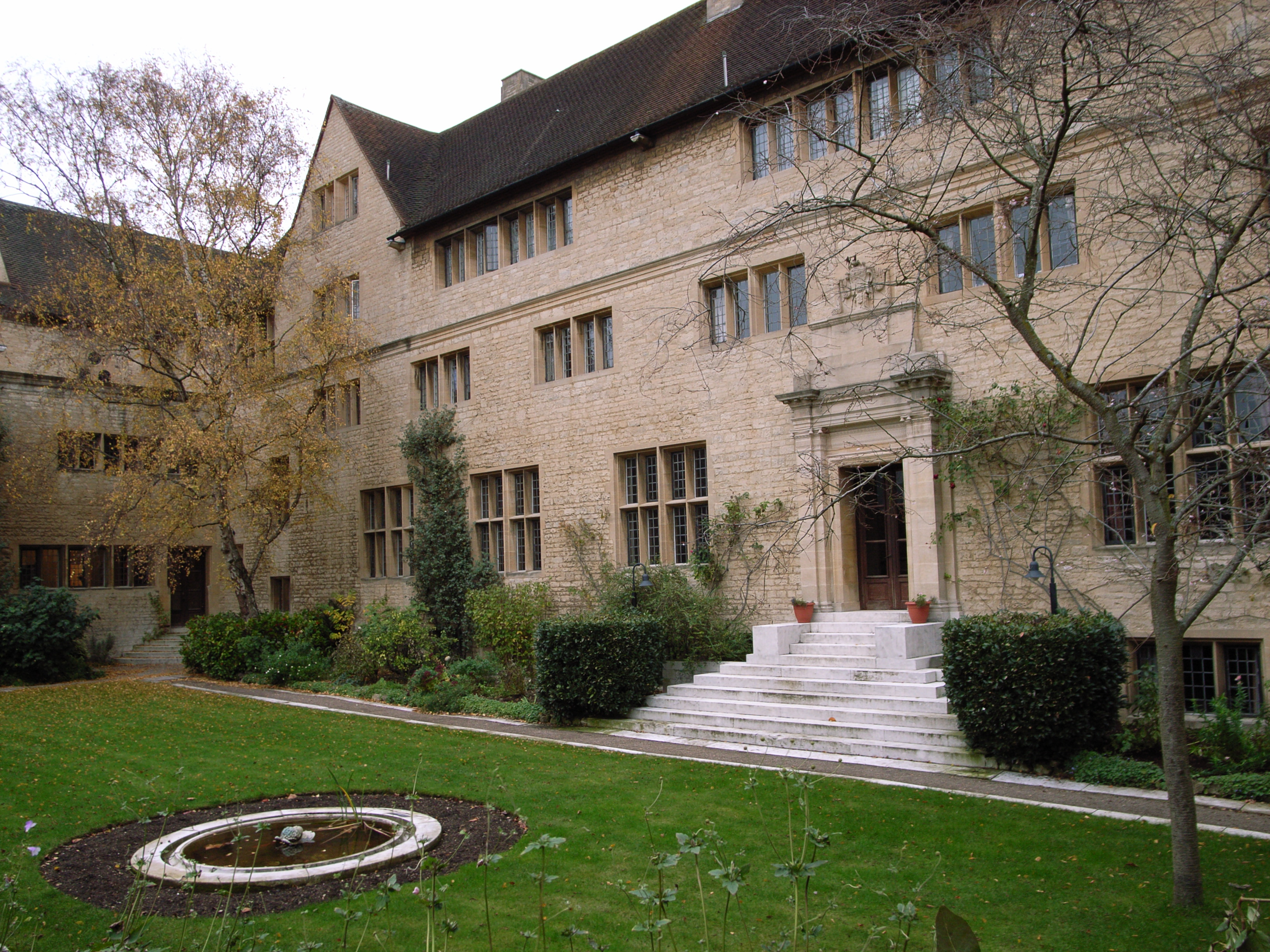

- Arms: Argent on a cross sable a plate charged with a wolf's head erased of the second between in pale two billets of the field that in chief charged with a cinquefoil and that in base with a saltire gules and in fesse as many plates each charged with a campion flower leaved and slipped proper on a chief also of the second two branches of palm in saltire enfiled with a celestial crown or.
- Location: Brewer Street, Oxford
- Coordinates: 51.7496°N 1.2582°W
- Founder: Richard Clarke SJ
- Established: 1896; 130 years ago
- Named after: Edmund Campion
- Master: Nicholas Austin SJ
- Postgraduates: 15
- Website: campion.ox.ac.uk

Map
- Location within Oxford city centre

Campion Hall is one of the four permanent private halls of the University of Oxford in England. A Catholic hall, it is run by the Society of Jesus and named after Edmund Campion, a martyr and fellow of St John's College, Oxford. The hall is located on Brewer Street, between Christ Church and Pembroke College. The buildings, along with many of the fixtures and fittings, were designed by Sir Edwin Lutyens, his only buildings in Oxford. The hall also houses an extensive collection of religious art spanning 600 years; the pieces were collected primarily by Fr Martin D'Arcy in the 1930s.

== History ==
=== Origins ===
The origins of Campion Hall began on 9 September 1896 when Fr Richard Clarke, who was a former member of St John's College, Oxford, opened a private hall called Clarke's Hall. He was sent by his superiors from the Church of the Immaculate Conception, Farm Street, in London to St. Aloysius Church in Oxford to set up a hall for Jesuit undergraduates. He founded a small house at 40 St Giles', Oxford, and was the first master of the hall. On 10 September 1896 the hall had its first four students. The hall allowed Jesuits to study for degrees from the University of Oxford.

The rented accommodation that was originally used was too small and 15 months later the hall was moved to Middleton Hall at 11 St Giles', which was leased to the Society of Jesus until 1936.

=== Pope's Hall ===
In 1900, Fr Clarke died suddenly at York and, with his death, the hall ceased to exist. That year the hall was reopened as Pope's Hall under Fr O'Fallon Pope as master who continued to be master until 1915. In 1902, he purchased 14 and 15 St Giles' and, in 1903, 13 St Giles' was also bought.

=== Campion Hall ===
Fr O'Fallon Pope was succeeded by Fr Charles Plater and the hall again changed its name, this time to Plater's Hall.

In 1918, the hall was granted permanent status and changed its name to Campion Hall after St Edmund Campion, an English Jesuit and martyr who had been a fellow at St John's College. Permanent private halls (PPH) within the University of Oxford were established for the reception of students on the condition that they are not for purposes of profit. Apart from Campion Hall, the other early permanent private halls were St Benet's Hall from 1918 and St Peter's Hall from 1929 to 1947. Permanent private halls have the same privileges as members of colleges.

In 1921, Fr Plater died and Fr Henry Keane was appointed master, until his retirement in 1926. He was succeeded by Fr Ernest G. Vignaux, who was master until 1933. At that time, there were plans for the building of a new hall in Giles'. He was succeeded as master by Fr Martin D'Arcy until 1945.

=== Moving to Brewer Street ===
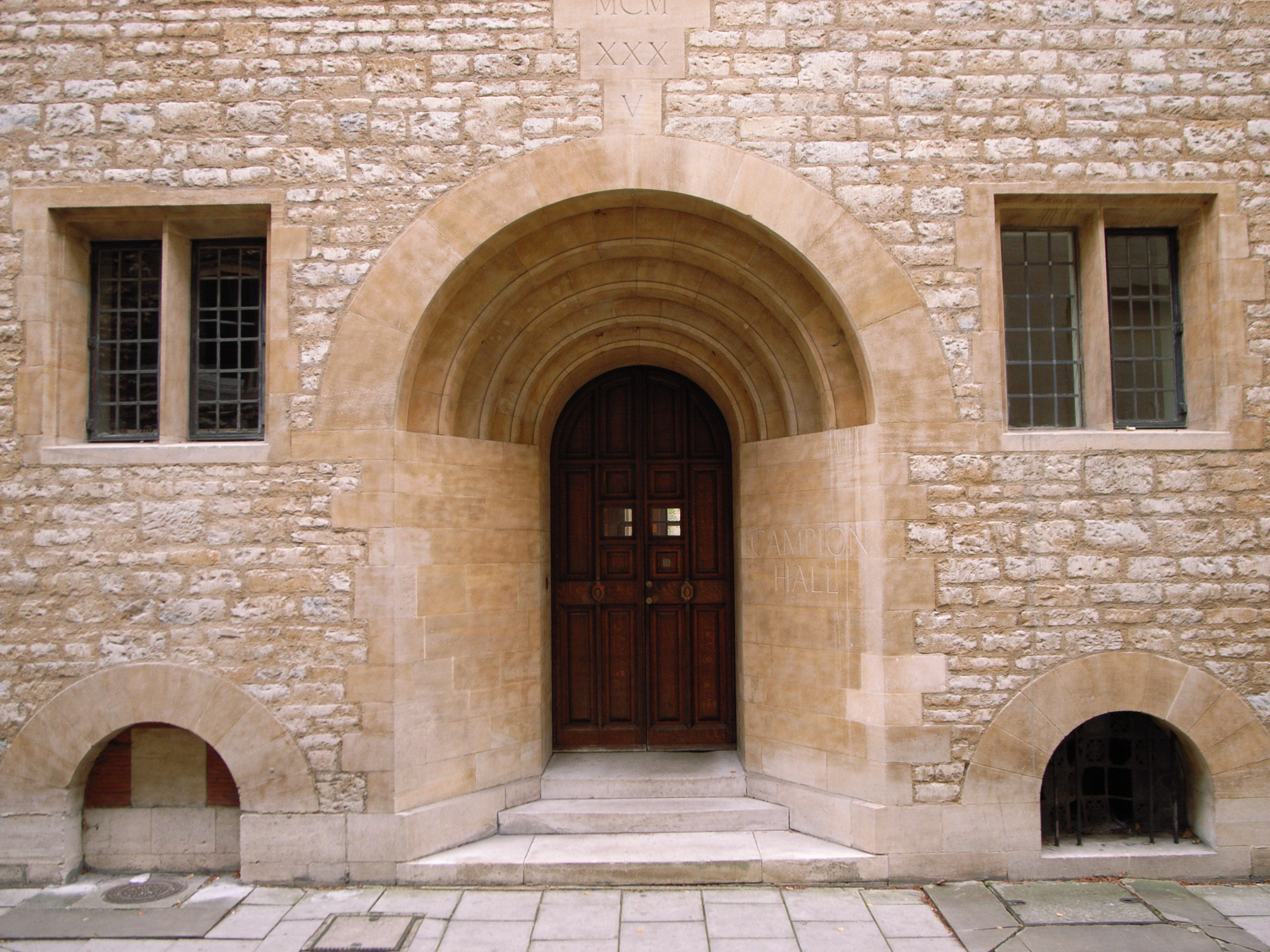
Campion Hall Main Door

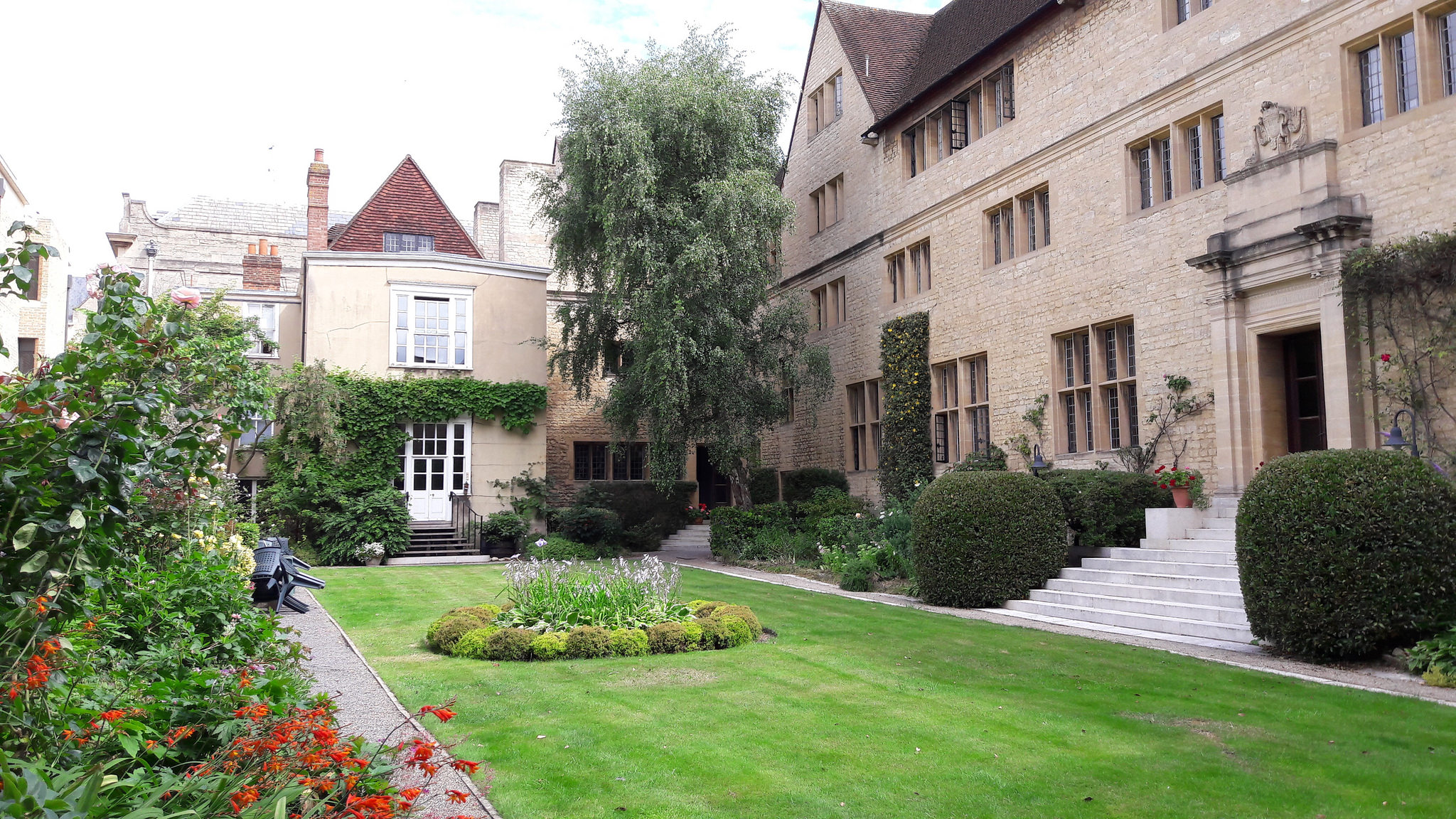
Campion Hall garden

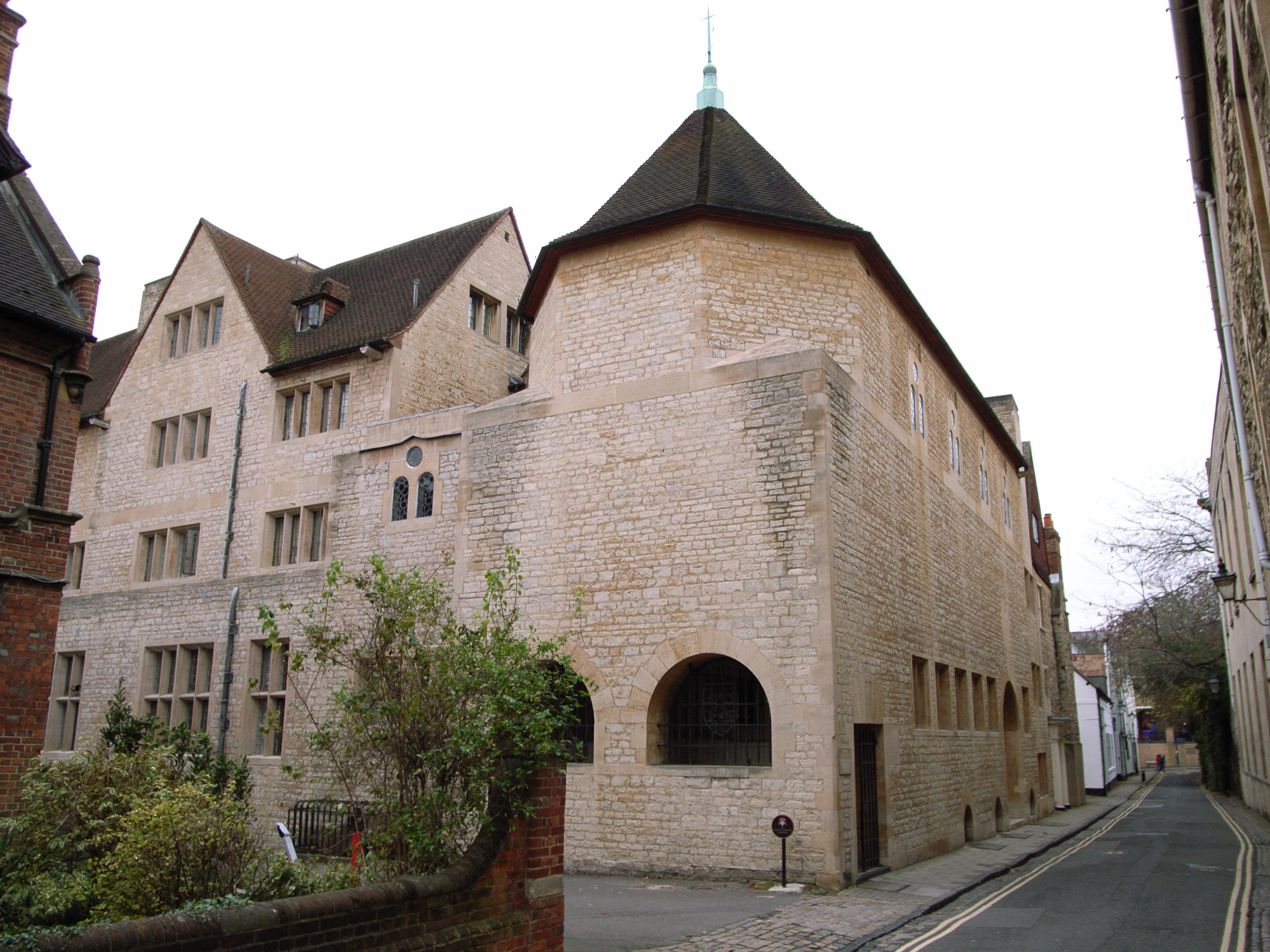
External view of Campion Hall with the chapel (right), from Brewer Street

In 1933, when Fr. D'Arcy became Master, the lease of the St. Giles property had only three years to run, so in 1935 a project of building in St. Giles was dropped and a new home was found in Brewer Street. The properties in St. Giles's were subsequently sold to St. John's College.

Brewer Street, also known as 'Sleying Lane', was occupied in the medieval period by brewers and butchers. There is a long history of brewing in Oxford. Several of the colleges had private breweries, one of which, Brasenose College, survived until 1889. In the 16th century, brewing and malting appeared to have been the most popular trades in the city. By 1874 there were nine breweries in Oxford and 13 brewers' agents in Oxford shipping beer in from elsewhere, Brewer Street was no exception.

At Brewer Street, Campion Hall bought two buildings, one a large and ancient lodging house, known as 'Micklem Hall', which in the past belonged to Hall's Brewery. It was owned by a brewer named Micklem (1820–1870). The second building was a garage which had once been the stables for the horses which pulled the Oxford trams. The garage was demolished, as well as some of the rooms of Micklem Hall, with others incorporated into the new building.

The new building was designed by Sir Edwin Lutyens and completed in 1936. The building was opened in June 1936, by the Duke of Alba, Spanish ambassador to London, alongside Alban Goodier S.J., the former Archbishop of Bombay, and Julian Asquith, 2nd Earl of Oxford and Asquith.

The building was Grade II* listed in 1954. It is the only building in Oxford designed by Lutyens, although in 1928 he did design the fountain in Tom Quad at nearby Christ Church. The style of Lutyens's exterior has been compared to 17th-century Cotswold architecture. The chapel has a semi-circular apse with a baldachin, and Lutyens provided chapel light fittings having red tassels like those on a cardinal's hat.

In 1912 Lutyens had laid out New Delhi as the new capital of India. He devised an architectural Delhi Order there, with small bells hanging from the capitals of the columns, and subsequently made use of it in his design for Campion Hall, including in the columns supporting the baldachin in the chapel.

Fr. D'Arcy continued as Master of Campion Hall until 1945, when he was succeeded by Fr. Thomas Corbishley. In 2001, the Jesuit spirituality journal, The Way, began to operate from Campion Hall.

Campion Hall hosts the Jesuit academic community within University of Oxford and has an international student body, admitting graduate students in Humanities and Social Science subjects, and occasionally in other disciplines.

In 2018, the Laudato Si' Research Institute was started at Campion Hall. It has the aim of conducting and fostering inter-disciplinary research on issues relating to integral ecology.

=== Lost Michelangelo ===
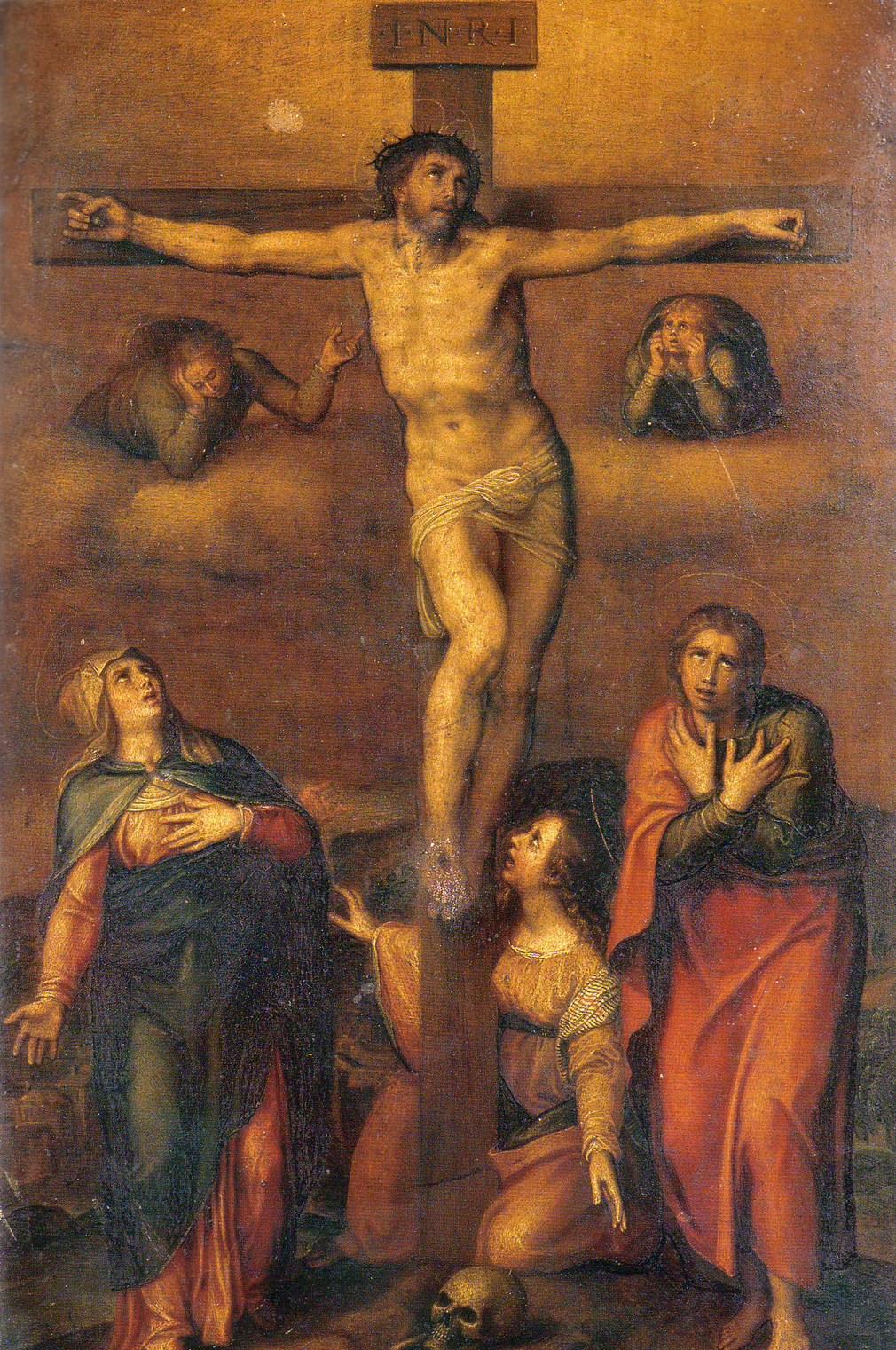
Possible Michelangelo Crucifixion of Christ, 1540

In 2011, a painting "The Crucifixion of Jesus" which had been hanging in a hall of Campion Hall, was thought to have been a long-lost Michelangelo masterpiece worth £100 million. The painting was bought by Fr. Martin D'Arcy when he was Master of Campion Hall at a Sotheby's auction in the 1930s. Some experts argue that the painting dates from towards the end of Michelangelo's life when his eyesight was failing, so is more likely to be a painting by Marcello Venusti.

The painting was removed from its position on a wall in Campion Hall and sent to the Ashmolean Museum where it is on display.

== Facilities ==
Campion Hall stands out from many Oxford colleges by not separating its common rooms for senior and middle members. Instead, all facilities are accessible to everyone, including students and fellows. The dining hall also lacks a High Table; for formal meals the Master and Fellows sit alongside the students.

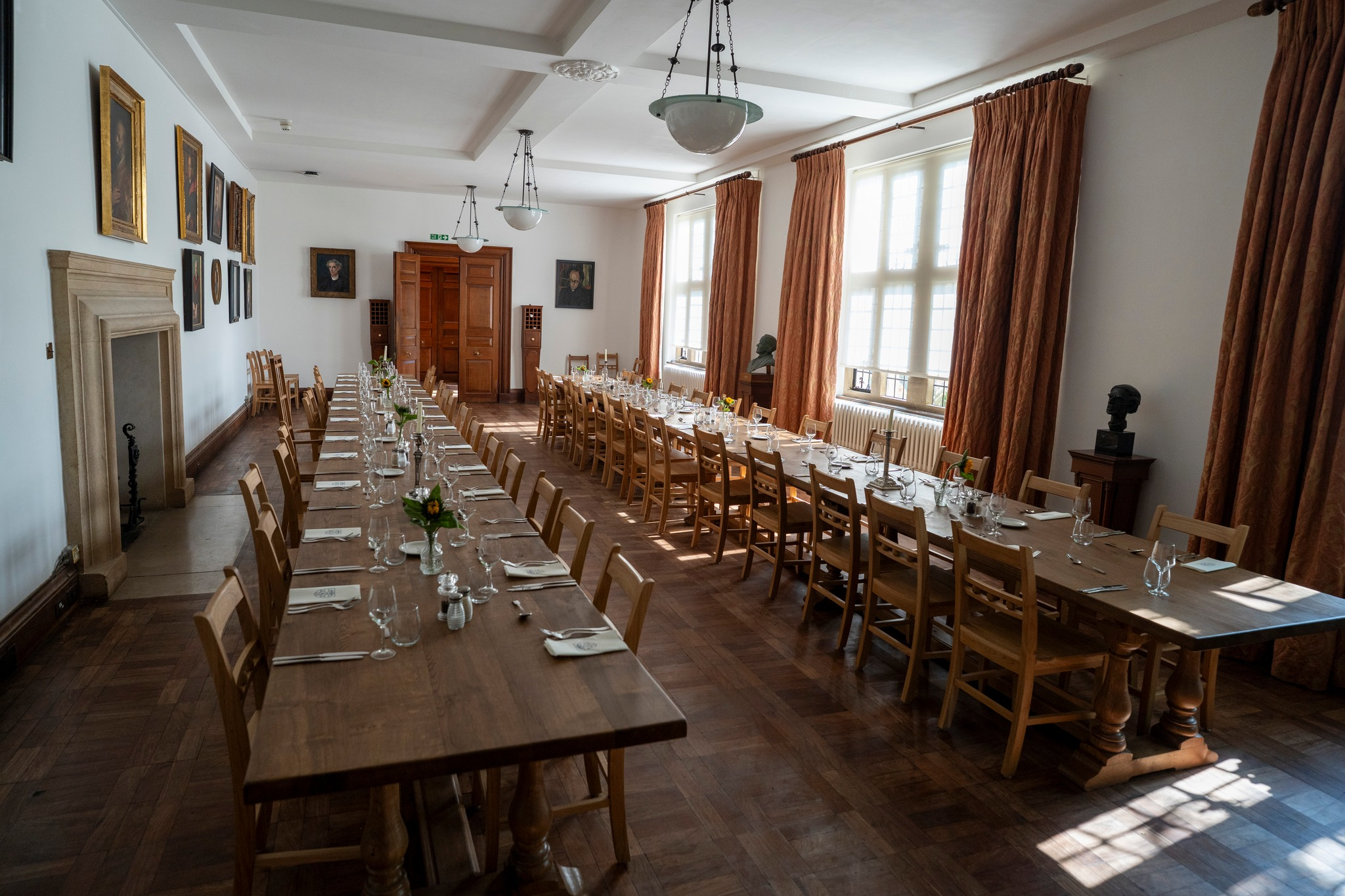
Dining Hall

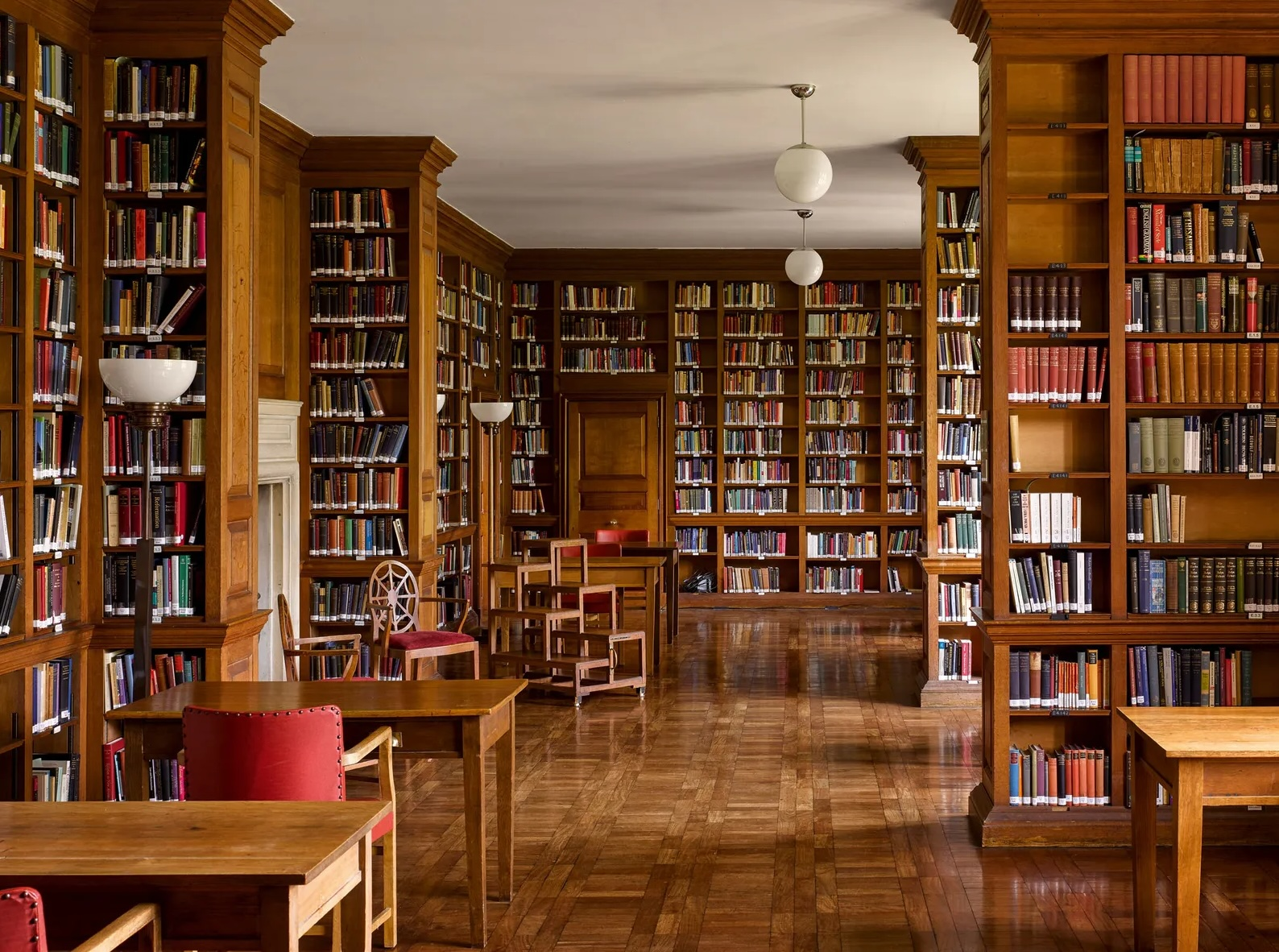
Library

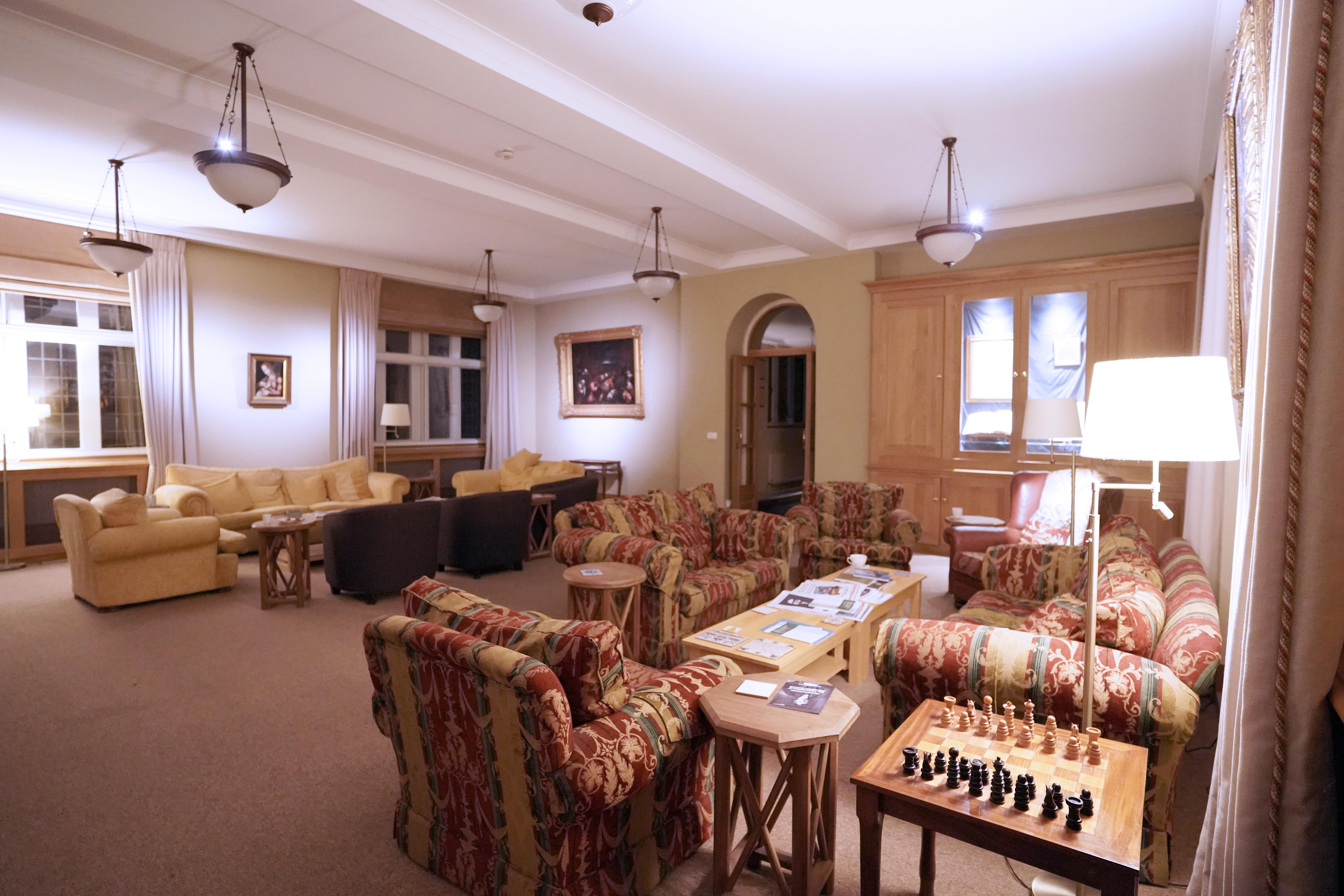
Common Room

== The Way ==
The Way is a spirituality journal that publishes articles quarterly to an international readership through an editorial board on subjects relating to contemporary Christian spirituality and operates out of Campion Hall. It was founded in 1961 by its editor James Walsh. He was joined by William Yeomans, Denise Critchley-Salmonson and Philip Caraman, who also edited The Month. Originally it was located in Heythrop Park. In September 1970, it moved to Beaumont College and Michael Ivens joined the staff. In May 1972, it moved to Southwell House in West Hampstead. In 1978, it moved again, this time to Campion House in Osterley in 1978. In the early 1980s, it moved to Heythrop College's new location in London, as part of the Institute of Spirituality there. James Walsh stood down as editor and Philip Sheldrake, David Lonsdale and later Lavinia Byrne became editors. In 1992, Jacqueline Hawkins became the editor. In 2001, it moved to Campion Hall and Philip Endean with Elizabeth Lock became editors two years later. It was relaunched and ceased publishing the annual supplement. In 2008, Philip Endean was replaced by Paul Nicholson. Since 2022 Philip Harrison has taken the position of editor.

== Laudato Si' Research Institute ==
The Laudato Si' Research Institute is based at Campion Hall. It opened in 2019 and was named after the encyclical by Pope Francis. Led by Professor Celia Deane-Drummond, it conducts transdisciplinary research through an integral ecology approach. Research projects include a focus on Catholic approaches to mining, endangered languages, Christian-Muslim dialogue on ecology, and the ecumenical process towards a Feast of Creation. The Laudato Si' Research Institute releases original publications on integral ecology, including research papers, books, briefing notes and reports.

== Masters ==
- Fr. Richard Clarke (1896–1900)
- Fr. O'Fallon Pope (1900–1915)
- Fr. Charles Plater (1915–1921)
- Fr. Henry Keane (1921–1926)
- Fr. Ernest G. Vignaux (1926–1933)
- Fr. Martin D'Arcy (1933–1945)
- Fr. Thomas Corbishley (1945–1958)
- Fr. Anthony Doyle (1958–1962)
- Fr. Derek Hanshell (1962–1965)
- Fr. Edward Yarnold (1965–1972)
- Fr. Benjamin Winterborn (1972–1978)
- Fr. Paul Edwards (1978–1985)
- Fr. Peter Hackett (1985–1989)
- Rev. Dr. Joseph Munitiz (1989–1998)
- Rev. Dr. Gerard J Hughes (1998–2006)
- Rev. Dr. Peter L'Estrange (2006–2008)
- Fr. Brendan Callaghan (2008–2013)
- Rev. Dr. James Hanvey (2013–2018)
- Rev. Dr. Nicholas Austin (2018– Present)

== See also ==
- Permanent private hall
- List of Jesuit sites in the United Kingdom
- List of Jesuit educational institutions
