= Thomas Pounde =

English Jesuit lay brother

Thomas Pounde (29 May 1539 – 5 March 1614) was an English Jesuit lay brother.

== Life ==
Pounde was born at Belmont (Beaumond), Farlington, Hampshire. He was the eldest son of William Pounde and Helen/Anne, the sister or half-sister to Thomas Wriothesley, Earl of Southampton. He is reported to have been educated at Winchester College. He was admitted to Lincoln's Inn on 16 February 1559/60, and with the death of his father the same month, he succeeded to Belmont, and soon after was appointed esquire of the body to Queen Elizabeth I. He acted the part of Mercury in George Gascoigne's Masque, performed before the queen at Kenilworth Castle in 1565. During the reveries of Christmastide, 1569, while dancing before the queen, he stumbled and fell at her feet. The queen reportedly kicked him and said, "Rise, Sir Ox". Pounde, humiliated, replied "Sic transit gloria mundi" and thenceforward retired from court life.

Shortly afterwards he was reconciled to the Roman Catholic Church, probably by Father Henry Alway, and, after some time of seclusion at Beaumond, began an active career as a proselytiser. He was in the Marshalsea Prison for six months in 1574; in the Winchester jail for some months in 1575/6; and in the Marshalsea again from 9 March 1575/6 to 18 September 1580, being made a Jesuit lay-brother by a letter dated 1 December 1578 from the Father-General Everard Mercurian, sent at the instance of Father Thomas Stevens. From the Marshalsea Pounde was removed to Waytemore Castle, and thence to the bishop's palace in Wisbech. Then he was in the Tower of London, from 13 August 1581 to 7 December 1585. He was in the White Lion, Southwark, from 1 September 1586, till he was sent back to Wisbech in 1587, where he remained nearly ten years. He was again in the Tower of London, from February 1596/7 to the autumn of 1598, when he was again committed to Wisbech. From Wisbech he was relegated to Wood Street Counter where he remained for six weeks from 19 December 1598. After that he was in the Tower again until 7 July 1601. He was then in Framlingham Castle for a year. In 1602 he was in Newgate, and in the following year he was indicted at York. Afterwards he was in the Gatehouse, Westminster, for some time, and then in the Tower (for the fourth time) for four months, and lastly in the Fleet Prison for three months. He was finally liberated in late 1604 or early in 1605, having spent nearly thirty years in prison.

== Poetry ==
That Pounde practised verse is known from the two court masques he performed in the mid-1560s, which show that in his idle youth he was writing in Elizabeth's court. Traditionally, Pounde has been thought to be the author of a long poem which exists in a unique manuscript in The National Archives: "A challenge unto ffox the martirmonger (John Foxe, the martyrologist) . . . with a comforte vnto all afflicted Catholyques". Written in the Tower in 1582, about the time of the trial of Edmund Campion, the 512-line poem was probably addressed to Francis Tregian the Elder. Long forgotten, the poem was discovered by Richard Simpson in the 1850s in the course of his monumental labours transcribing documents of recusant history from the Public Records Office (now The National Archives) for an intended "martyrology," publishing the results in a sequence of essays in The Rambler. Simpson's transcription of the poem was published in 2009, marking the first time in its four-hundred year history that the entirety of Pounde's poem saw the light of day.

== Bibliography ==
- Matthias Tanner, Societas Jesu Apostolorum Imatatrix (Prague, 1694), 450.
- Henry Foley, Records of the English Province (London, 1877–83).
- Notes and Queries, 10th series, IV and V (London, 1905–06).
- Calendars of Domestic State Papers.
- Dasent, Acts of the Privy Council.
- Catholic Record Society's Publications.
- John Morris, Troubles of our Catholic Forefathers (London, 1872–77).
- Richard Simpson, "Biographical Sketch of Thomas Poundes," The Rambler, VIII (1857), 24–38, 94–106; "The Captive's Keepsake," The Rambler, 1 (1859) 271-77, and Edmund Campion: A Biography. New Edition. London, 1896.

That entry was by John B. Wainewright.
