= Francis Tregian the Elder =

British landowner

Francis Tregian
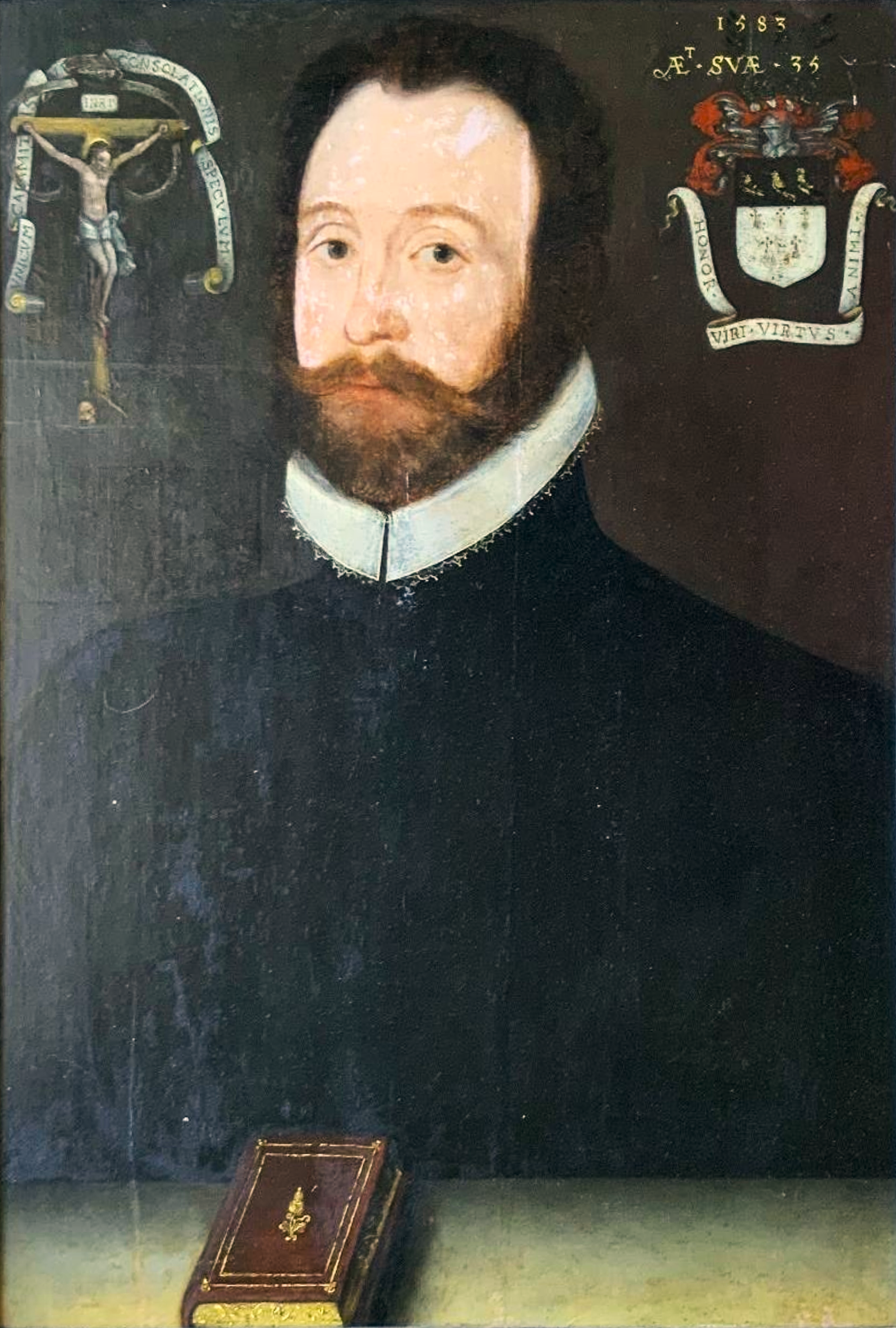
- Born: 1548
- Died: 25 September 1608 (aged 59–60); Lisbon, Portugal
- Resting place: Igreja de São Roque
- Other name: Francisco Tregian
- Occupation: Landowner
- Children: Francis Tregian the Younger

Francis Tregian the Elder (1548–1608) was a Cornish recusant and landowner in Cornwall. He was arrested and imprisoned, and later pardoned.

== Biography ==
Tregian was the son of John Tregian of Wolvenden of Probus, Cornwall and Catherine Arundell, the daughter of Sir John and Lady Elizabeth Arundell of Lanherne.

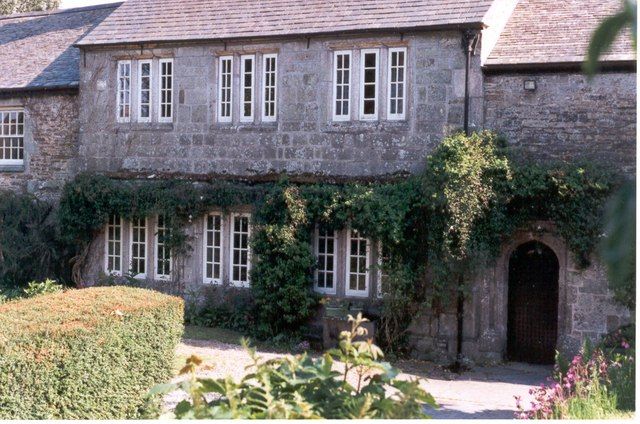
Golden Manor House

A staunch Catholic, he inherited substantial estates on the death of his father, including the manors of Bedock, Landegy, Lanner and Carvolghe, and the family home, 'Golden', in the parish of Probus, near Truro. He was the father of Francis Tregian the Younger, notable for his musical interests. He had resided at the English Court in order to help the persecuted Catholics. In 1576 Tregian harboured at Golden Manor House a Catholic seminary priest, Cuthbert Mayne, who passed as his steward.

=== Arrest ===
On 8 June 1577, the Sheriff of Cornwall, Richard Grenville surrounded the house with some hundred men and arrested both Tregian and Mayne. The assizes was held in Launceston, Cornwall on 16 September 1577. Tregian was indicted under the Statute of Praemunire prohibiting dissemination of papal bulls. Mayne had a souvenir copy of a proclamation regarding the 1575 Holy Year dispensation, and it was supposed that he intended to give it to Tregian. Tregian was held in the Marshalsea for ten months before being returned to Cornwall for trial. At first the jury would return no verdict, but after threats from the judges a conviction was obtained.

=== Imprisonment ===
Tregian's death sentence was remitted to imprisonment and his property confiscated. He was incarcerated at Windsor and then in various London prisons for twenty-eight years, eventually winding up at Fleet Prison, where his wife joined him. On the petition of his friends, he was released by King James I in Chelsea in 1601, and Tregian left England in 1603.

The case demonstrates "...the political and religious infighting that continued in local communities...as Protestant officials took the opportunity to settle personal scores and to take revenge on Catholic neighbors for penalties inflicted during Queen Mary's reign."

The execution of Cuthbert Mayne marked the beginning of the Elizabethan’s regime’s violent onslaught against Catholic dissent, a violence whose most famous victim would be Edmund Campion, executed in 1581. Tregian was in the Fleet Prison at the time of Campion's execution, but his close friend the Jesuit lay brother Thomas Pounde was in the Tower of London with Campion. The sufferings of Tregian and Campion make up part of the story of Catholic persecution told in the first part of Pounde's long poem of that year, "A Challenge unto Foxe the Martyrmonger...with a comfort unto all afflicted Catholics," confiscated in 1581 and surviving in a unique manuscript in The National Archives. The poem was probably dedicated to Tregian. It is preceded by a cover letter that begins, “To the ryght worshipfull my loving brother Mr F health & welthe in our Savyor.” For nineteenth-century Catholic scholars like Richard Simpson and Henry Foley, "Mr F" was Francis Tregian. There is an element of conjecture in the identification," but it is certain that Pounde and Tregian were together for nine months in the loose confinement of the Marshalsea, Pounde from March 1576 to Sept. 1580 and Tregian from Sept 1577 until at least June 1578, and that given their shared literary interests they would have known each other there. The Tower and the Fleet were separated by little more than the width of the Thames, and Tregian had the privilege of receiving visitors. Clandestine manuscripts and books circulated among all the London prisons, so that there is nothing surprising in Pounde’s manuscript being conveyed from the Tower to the Fleet.

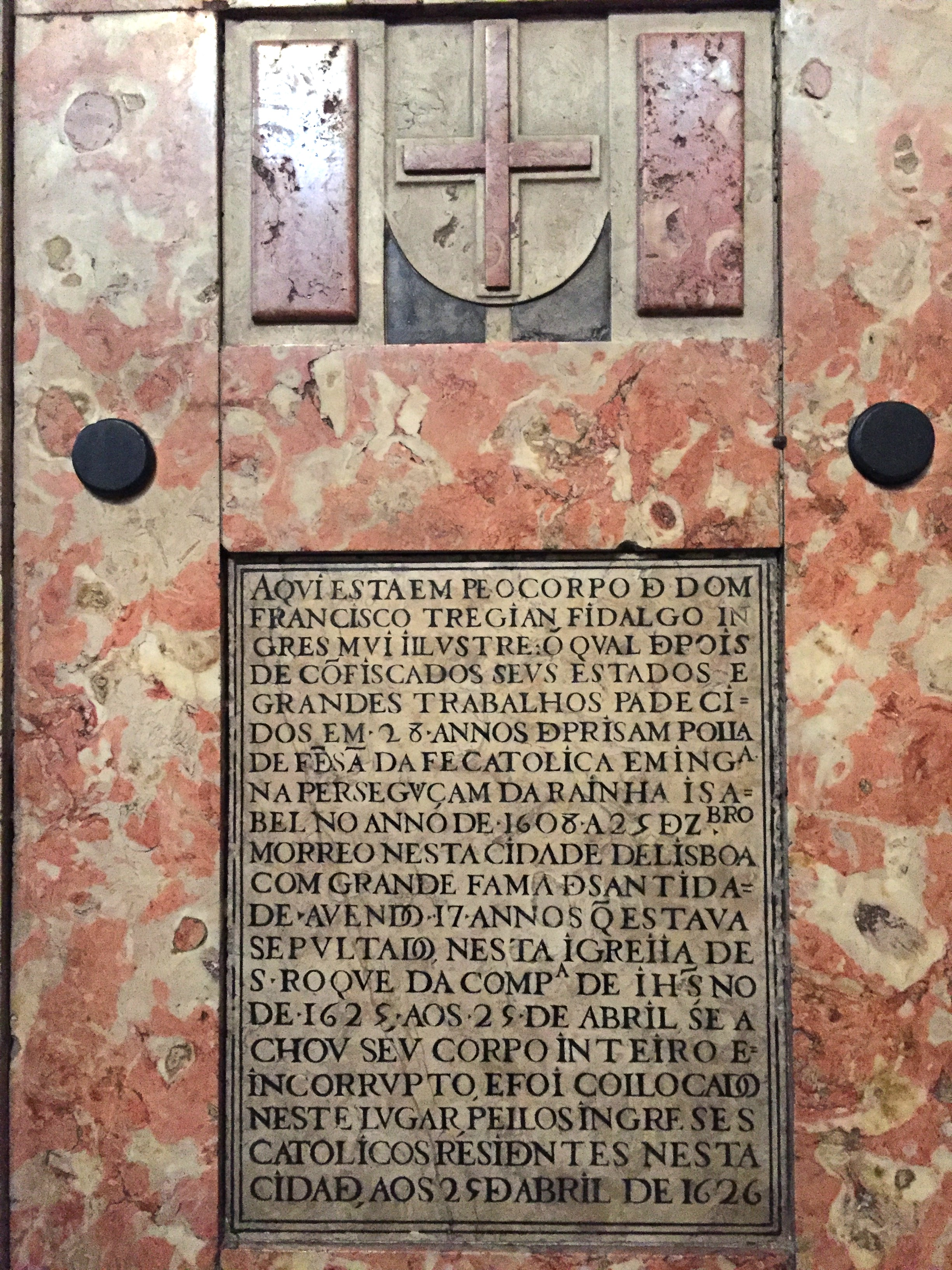
Tregian's memorial in Igreja de São Roque, Lisbon

=== Later years ===
After his pardon by King James, Tregian retired to Madrid, where he enjoyed a pension from King Philip III of Spain. He died at the Jesuit hospice at Igreja de São Roque, Lisbon, where he was buried. His upright tomb is now beneath the west pulpit between the Chapel of St Anthony and the Chapel of Our Lady of Piety. (Tregian was initially interred beneath the floor of the nave in front of the Chapel of the Holy Sacrament; an inscribed stone still marks that spot.) The inscription on the present tomb, translated, reads:

Here stands the body of Dom Francis Tregian, a most illustrious English gentleman who, after his estates had been confiscated and he had endured great hardships during 28 years of imprisonment for defending the Catholic faith in England during Queen Elizabeth's persecution, died in this city of Lisbon on 25 December 1608 [sic] enjoying a great reputation for holiness. Having been buried in this Church of São Roque of the Society of Jesus for 17 years, on 25 April 1625, his body was found whole and incorrupt, and was placed in this spot by the English Catholics residing in this city on 25 April 1626.

== Biographies ==
- P. A. Boyan and G. R. Lamb, Francis Tregian, Cornish Recusant (London and New York, 1955)
- Raymond Francis Trudgian, Francis Tregian, 1548-1608: Elizabethan recusant, a truly Catholic Cornishman (Brighton and Portland, 1998)
- Francis Plunkett, Life of Francis Tregian. Written in the seventeenth century by Francis Plunkett, Cistercian monk. In: Catholic Record Society (Great Britain) vol. 32 (1932) p. 1-44. Each section of Latin text followed by English translation.
