= Francis Tregian =

Francis Tregian may refer to:

- Francis Tregian the Elder (1548–1608), English Catholic exile
- Francis Tregian the Younger (1574–1619), his son, music copyist
