= Daniel Fournier (disambiguation) =

Daniel Fournier is a Canadian politician and businessperson.

Daniel Fournier may also refer to:

- Daniel Fournier (Liberal candidate)
- Daniel Fournier (engraver)
