= Pietro Paolo Bombino =

Italian Jesuit theologian

Reverend Pietro Paolo Bombino SJ
- Born: c. 1575; Cosenza, Kingdom of Naples
- Died: 1648; Mantua, Duchy of Mantua
- Occupations: Jesuit priest; Orator; Theologian; Historian
- Known for: First major biography of Edmund Campion

Academic work
- Era: Renaissance humanism
- Discipline: Rhetoric; Theology; Hagiography
- Institutions: Roman College; University of Parma
- Influenced: Richard Simpson

Pietro Paolo Bombino SJ (c. 1575–1648) was an Italian Jesuit, orator, theologian and historian. Bombino was the first biographer of Edmund Campion.

== Biography ==
Born in Cosenza, Calabria, he joined the Jesuits in 1592 and taught Philosophy and Sacred Scripture at the Roman College. In 1601-2 he taught Rhetoric in Parma. He later left the Society of Jesus to join the Somaschan Order in which he took vows in 1629.

A prolific author, he served as Ferdinando Gonzaga’s theologian until 1622. Bombino died in 1648, leaving, among other things, an expurgated edition of Catullus, various orations, a Life of St. Ignatius of Loyola (1609) and an abridgment of the History of Spain (1634). He was an admirer of Galileo, with whom he corresponded about measuring latitude.

His biography of Campion, Vita et Martyrium Edmundi Campiani, Martyris Angli e Societate Jesu (“Life and Martyrdom of Edmund Campion, English Martyr of the Society of Jesus”), was first published at Antwerp in 1618 and reprinted in an elegant edition in Mantua, in 1620. Bombino drew on several sources including the writings and oral accounts of Campion's fellow missionary Robert Persons. Persons passed his incomplete Of the life and martirdome of Edmund Campion to Bombino and personally assisted him with the writing of his book. Bombino also had access to the various eye-witness testimonies of English Catholic priests still alive: Richard Stanihurst († 1618), Henry Holland († 1625), John Colleton († 1635) and Thomas Fitzherbert († 1640).

Bombino's Vita enjoyed a notable commercial success and was reprinted several times. German scholar Caspar Schoppe considered it a book “of pure and refined expression, and exquisite elegance” (“castæ et emendatæ dictionis, et exquisitæ elegantiæ”). An anonymous 17th century English translation of the 1618 edition, once the possession of Archbishop William Sancroft, is preserved in the Bodleian Library (MS Tanner 329).

Richard Simpson, the modern biographer of Campion, made full use of Bombino (as his notebooks show). In the Archives of the Society of Jesus in Rome there is a copy of Bombino's work, in which there are many additions by the author, which have not yet been published.

== Works ==
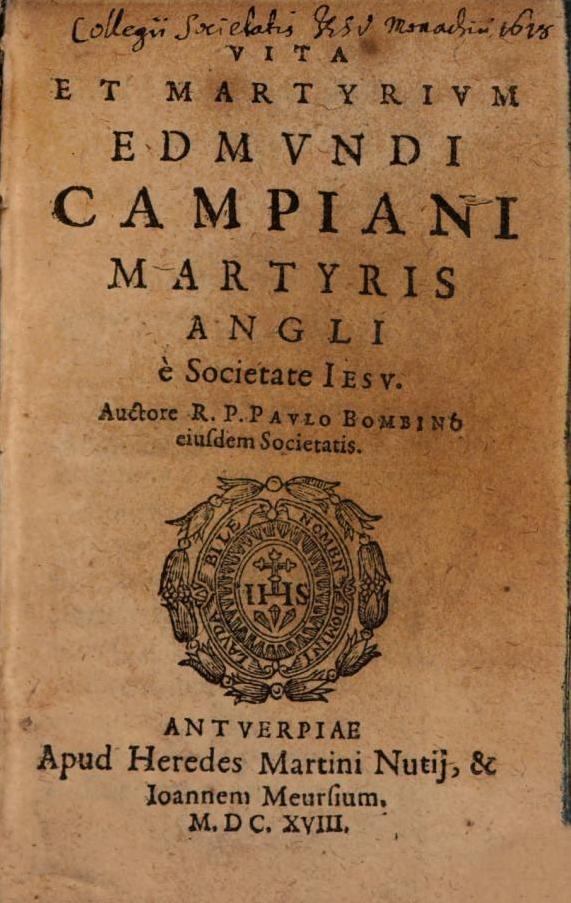
Vita et Martyrium Edmundi Campiani, Antverpiæ, apud Heredes Martini Nutii et Joannem Meursium, 1618

- In funere Margaritæ Austriæ Uxoris Philippi III. Hispaniarum Regis habita ad Sodales Virginis Assumptæ in ædibus Societatis Jesu, Romæ, apud Bartholom. Zannettum, 1611; ibid. 1671.
- In die Parasceves, Oratio habita in Sacello Pontificio, Romæ, apud Mascardum, 1612; ibid., apud Franciscum Caballum, 1612.
- De adventu Spiritus Sancti, Oratio habita in Sacello Pontifcio, Romæ, apud Jacobum Mascardum, 1612.
- In die VII Pentecostes, Oratio, etc., Romæ, ap. Mascardum 1612;
- Vestigium Gymnasii Romani, quali ornatu exceperit venientem ad se Scipionem Cardinalem Burghesium. Romæ: ap. Mascardum. 1615.
- Vita di Sant'Ignazio Lojola, Naples, Lazzaro Scoriggio, 1615; Rome, Zannetti, 1622; Naples, Secondino Roncagliolo, 1627.
- Vita et Martyrium Edmundi Campiani Angli Soc. Jesu, Antuerpiæ, apud heredes Martini Nutii, et Joh. Meursium, 1618; Mantuæ, apud Osannas, 1620; Parisiis, 1620; Neapoli, 1627.
- In funere Cosmi II. Etruriæ Ducis, Oratio, etc. Mantuæ, apud Franciscum Osannam, 1621.
- In funere Philippi III. Hispaniarum Regis, Oratio, etc., Mantuæ, apud Osannam, 1621.
- In funere Ferdinandi II. Cæsaris, Oratio habita in Templo Sanctæ Barbaræ, etc. Mantuæ, apud Aurelium Osannam, 1632.
- Breviarium rerum Hispanicarum, Enneas Prima. Venetiis: ex Typographia Pinelliana. 1634.
- De Sfortiadum Originibus, seu Magnus Sfortia, Mediolani, apud Jo. Baptistam Malatestam.
- In Sigismundum II Poloniæ Regem Elogium, Mediolani, apud Jo. Baptistam Malatestam.

== Sources ==
- Mazzucchelli, Giammaria (1762). "Bombino (Pietro Paolo)". Gli scrittori d'Italia. Vol. 2. Brescia: Giambattista Bossini. pp. 1511–1512.
- This article incorporates public domain material from McClintock, John; Strong, James (1867–1887). Cyclopædia of Biblical, Theological and Ecclesiastical Literature. Harper and Brothers.
- Carlos Sommervogel et al., Bibliothèque de la Compagnie de Jésus, I, Louvain 1960, cols. 1682–84.
