= St Cuthbert Mayne School =

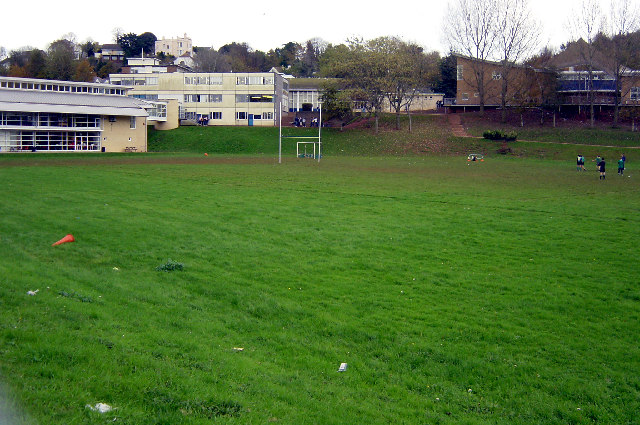
- St Cuthbert Mayne School, Torquay.

Location
- Trumlands Road; Torquay, Devon, TQ1 4RN; England; 50.48451°N 3.53193°W

Information
- Type: Voluntary aided school
- Religious affiliations: Roman Catholic / Church of England
- Local authority: Torbay
- Department for Education URN: 113551 Tables
- Ofsted: Reports
- Headteacher: James Down
- Gender: Coeducational
- Age: 11 to 18
- Website: st-cuthbertmayne.co.uk

St Cuthbert Mayne School is a coeducational secondary school and sixth form in Torquay in the English county of Devon. The school is named after Cuthbert Mayne, a Roman Catholic priest and martyr of the Reformation and Counter-Reformation.

It is a voluntary aided Roman Catholic and Church of England school administered by the Roman Catholic Diocese of Plymouth, the Church of England Diocese of Exeter and Torbay Council. The school admits pupils from all over Torbay. It is housed in a two-story building with a cantilevered glass facade.
