= Edmund Campion =

16th-century English Jesuit priest, martyr and saint

Saint Edmund Campion SJ
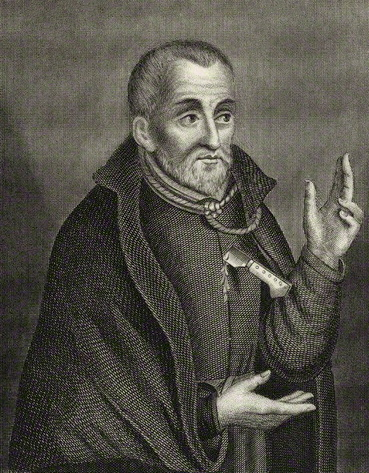
- Portrait of St Edmund Campion

Martyr
- Born: 25 January 1540; London, Kingdom of England
- Died: 1 December 1581 (aged 41); Tyburn, Kingdom of England
- Venerated in: Catholic Church
- Beatified: 29 December 1886, Rome by Pope Leo XIII
- Canonized: 25 October 1970, Rome by Pope Paul VI
- Feast: 1 December (individual with two companions); 4 May (all English Martyrs); 25 October (collectively with Forty Martyrs of England and Wales); 29 October (one of the Douai Martyrs)
- Attributes: Knife in chest, noose around neck, crucifix, holding a Bible, martyr's palm
- Patronage: United Kingdom
- Influenced: Henry Walpole; Cuthbert Mayne

Edmund Campion, SJ (25 January 1540 – 1 December 1581) was an English Jesuit priest and martyr. While conducting an underground ministry in officially Anglican England, Campion was arrested by priest hunters. Convicted of high treason, he was hanged, drawn and quartered at Tyburn. Campion was beatified by Pope Leo XIII in 1886 and canonised in 1970 by Pope Paul VI as one of the Forty Martyrs of England and Wales. His feast day is celebrated on 1 December.

== Early years and education (1540–1569) ==
Born in London on 25 January 1540, Campion was the son of a bookseller in Paternoster Row, near St Paul's Cathedral. He received his early education at Christ's Hospital school and, at the age of 13, was chosen to make the complimentary speech when Queen Mary visited the city in August 1553. William Chester, a governor of Christ's Hospital, took a special interest in him, and sponsored him as a scholar to St John's College, Oxford, where he became junior fellow in 1557 and took the required Oath of Supremacy, probably on the occasion of his B.A. degree in 1560. He took a master's degree at Oxford in 1564.

Two years later, Campion welcomed Queen Elizabeth to the university, and won her lasting regard. He was selected to lead a public debate in front of the Queen. By the time the Queen had left Oxford, Campion had earned the patronage of the powerful William Cecil and also the Earl of Leicester, reputed by some to be the future husband of the young Queen.

When Sir Thomas White, the founder of the college, was buried in 1567, it fell to Campion to give the Latin oration.

== Rejecting Anglicanism ==
Campion began to question Anglican teachings and was open to Catholic doctrines. However, at the persuasion of Richard Cheyney, Bishop of Gloucester, he received Holy Orders in 1564 and was ordained a deacon in the Anglican Church. However, he continued to struggle inwardly. Rumours of his support of Catholic opinions began to spread, and he left Oxford in 1569 and went to Ireland for private study and research. He did not, as Simpson said (now corrected by P. Joseph's revision of Simpson, 2010) plan to take part in a proposed establishment of the University of Dublin. On the other hand, it had become too dangerous for him to remain at Oxford without publicly supporting the Church of England.

=== Ireland (1569–1570) ===
Edmund Campion went to Ireland with his university friend, Richard Stanihurst, where he was the guest of Richard and his father, James Stanihurst, the Speaker of the Irish House of Commons. Warned of his imminent arrest by the Lord Deputy Sir Henry Sidney, he was transferred through Stanihurst's arrangement to the house of Christopher Barnewall at Turvey House in the Pale. For some three months he eluded his pursuers, going by the name "Mr Patrick" and occupying himself by writing A Historie of Ireland.

=== Douai (1571–1573) ===
In the year of 1571, Campion left Ireland in secret and escaped to Douai in the Low Countries (now France), where he was reconciled to the Catholic Church and received the Eucharist, for the first time in twelve years. He entered the English College, which had been founded by William Allen. The enrollment of the college grew, and a papal subsidy was granted shortly after Campion's arrival. Campion found himself reunited with Oxford friends. He was assigned to teach rhetoric while there, and he finished studying for the degree of Bachelor of Divinity, which was granted him by the University of Douai on 21 January 1573. Afterwards, he received minor orders and was ordained sub-deacon.

=== Rome, Brünn and Prague (1573–1580) ===
Campion then travelled to Rome on foot, alone and in the guise of a pilgrim, to join the Jesuits. In April 1573, in Rome, he became the first novice accepted into the Society of Jesus by Mercurianus, the order's fourth Superior General. He was assigned to the Austrian Province as there was not yet an English province of the Jesuits and began his two-year novitiate at Brünn (now Brno) in Moravia. He was ordained deacon and priest by Antonín Brus, OMCRS, Archbishop of Prague and said his first Mass on 8 September 1578. For six years, Campion taught at the Jesuit college in Prague as professor of both rhetoric and philosophy. In 1578, his play Ambrosia was staged in Prague by the students of the recently founded Jesuit College Clementinum.

=== Mission to England (1580–1581) ===
In 1580, the Jesuit mission to England began. The mission was strictly forbidden, according to Campion's Challenge to the Privy Council, "to deal in any respects with matters of state or policy of this [English] realm..." Campion accompanied Robert Persons who, as superior, was intended to counterbalance his own fervour and impetuousness. He had been surprised to learn that he was chosen to take part in the mission, and expressed the fear that he lacked constitutional courage. The members of the mission were instructed to avoid the company of boys and women and to avoid giving the impression of being legacy hunters. Before embarking, the members of the mission were embarrassed to receive news of a landing by papal-sponsored forces in the Irish province of Munster in support of the Irish rebel James Fitzmaurice Fitzgerald. They also learned that a letter detailing their party and mission had been intercepted and that they were expected in England.

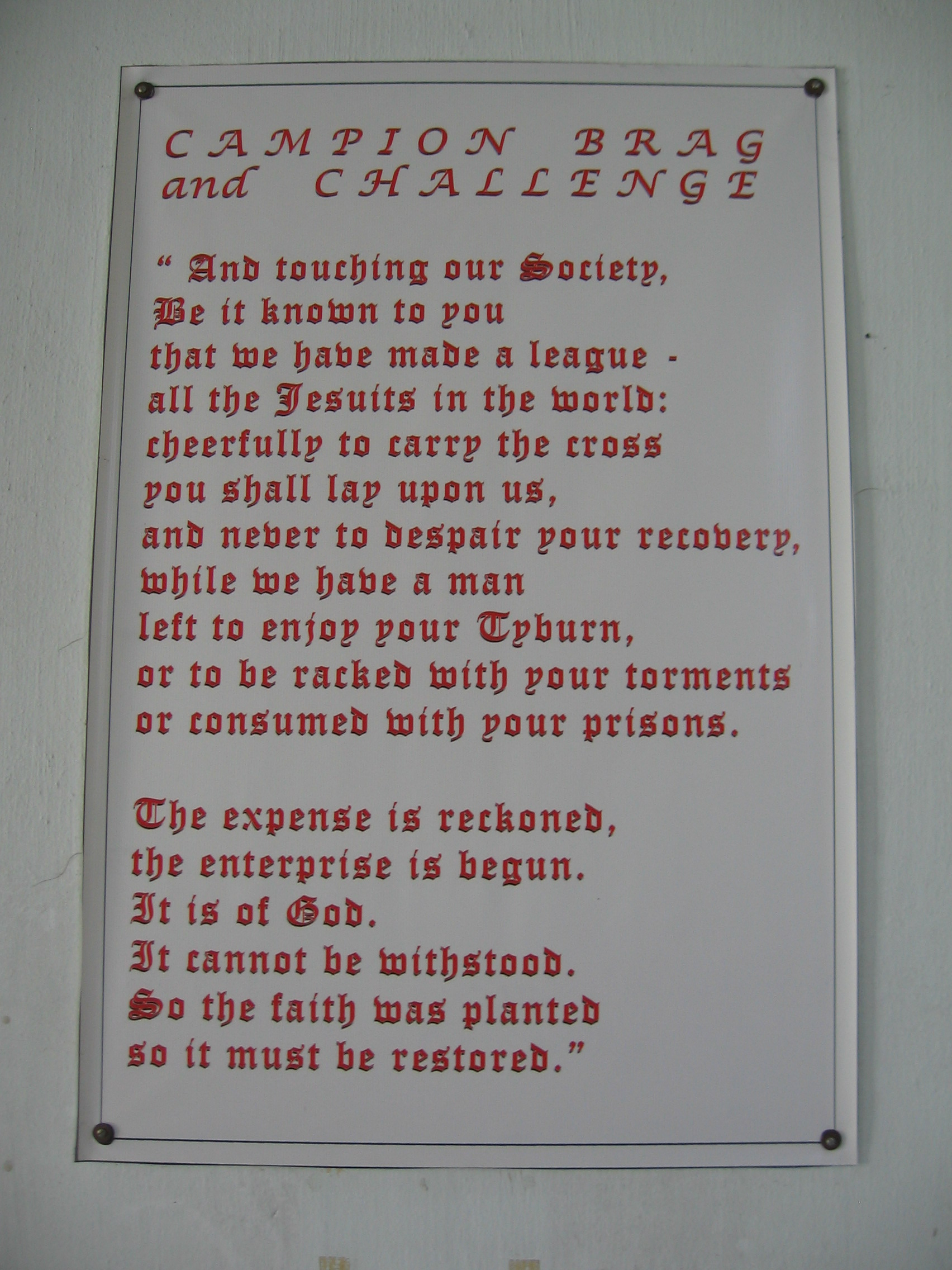
Part of Campion's Challenge to the Privy Council

Campion finally entered England in the guise of a jewel merchant, arriving in London on 24 June 1580, and he at once began to preach. His presence soon became known to the authorities and to his fellow Catholics, who were being held in London's prisons. Among the latter was Thomas Pounde in the Marshalsea. A meeting was held in Marshalsea to discuss possible means of counteracting rumours circulated by the Privy Council to the effect that Campion's mission was political and treasonous. Pounde rode in haste after Campion and explained to him the need for Campion to write a brief declaration of the true causes of his coming. When this declaration, popularly known as the Challenge to the Privy Council, or, Campion's Brag, was made public, it was widely read and made his position more difficult. For the next few years, Campion led a hunted life, administering the sacraments and preaching to Catholics in Berkshire, Oxfordshire, Northamptonshire, and Lancashire.

During this time he wrote his Decem Rationes ("Ten Reasons"), arguments against the validity of the Anglican Church. This pamphlet, written in Latin, was printed in a clandestine press at Stonor Park, Henley, and 400 copies were found on the benches of St Mary's, Oxford, at the Commencement, on 27 June 1581. It caused great sensation, and the hunt for Campion was stepped up. On his way to Norfolk, he stopped at Lyford Grange, the house of Francis Yate, then in Berkshire, where he preached on 14 July and the following day, by popular request. Here, he was betrayed by a spy named George Eliot, who had pretended to be a Catholic and had attended one of Campion's secret Masses. After being captured, Campion was taken to London with his arms pinioned and bearing on his hat a piece of paper with the inscription "Campion, the Seditious Jesuit".

== Imprisonment, torture and disputations ==
Imprisoned for four days in the Tower of London in a tiny cell called "Little Ease", Campion was then taken out and questioned by three Privy Councillors—Lord Chancellor Sir Thomas Bromley, Vice-Chamberlain of the Royal Household Sir Christopher Hatton and Robert Dudley, Earl of Leicester—on matters including whether he acknowledged Queen Elizabeth to be the true Queen of England. He replied that he did, and he was offered his freedom, wealth and honours, including the Archbishopric of Canterbury, which he could not accept in good conscience. (Note: It has often been reported that the Queen herself was present at this meeting, based upon second-hand reports, contained in letters sent after the supposed meeting, from people who were not present. More recently, however, correspondence has been located from Lord Burghley, chief advisor to Elizabeth I, which refers to the meeting and those present but makes no mention of the Queen. This suggests that the Queen was not present, but that her questions were put to Campion on her behalf by the Privy Councillors. See Peter Joseph's (2010) revision and enlargement of Simpson's 1867 biography, pp.357–358 and citations.)

Campion was imprisoned in the Tower more than four months and tortured on the rack two or three times. False reports of a retraction and of a confession by Campion were circulated. He had four public disputations with his Anglican adversaries, on 1, 18, 23 and 27 September 1581, at which they attempted to address the challenges of Campion's Challenge to the Privy Council and Decem Rationes. Although still suffering from the effects of his torture and allowed neither time nor books for preparation, he reportedly conducted himself so easily and readily that "even the spectators in the court looked for an acquittal".

He was arraigned and indicted on 14 November 1581 with several others at Westminster on a charge of having conspired, in Rome and Reims, to raise a sedition in the realm and dethrone the Queen.

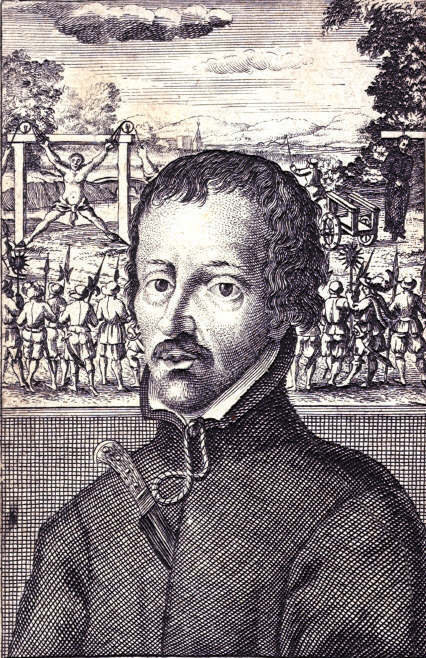
Print of Edmund Campion in 1631

== Trial, sentence and execution ==
The trial was held on 20 November 1581. After hearing the pleadings for three hours, the jury deliberated an hour before delivering its verdict: Campion and his fellow defendants were found guilty of treason. He answered the verdict:

In condemning us, you condemn all your own ancestors, all our ancient bishops and kings, all that was once the glory of England—the island of saints, and the most devoted child of the See of Peter.

Lord Chief Justice Wray read the sentence: "You must go to the place from whence you came, there to remain until ye shall be drawn through the open city of London upon hurdles to the place of execution, and there be hanged and let down alive, and your privy parts cut off, and your entrails taken out and burnt in your sight; then your heads to be cut off and your bodies divided into four parts, to be disposed of at Her Majesty’s pleasure. And God have mercy on your souls."

On hearing the death sentence, Campion and the other condemned men broke into the words of the Te Deum. After spending his last days in prayer he was dragged with two fellow priests, Ralph Sherwin and Alexander Briant, to Tyburn where the three were hanged, drawn and quartered on 1 December 1581. Campion was 41 years of age.

== Veneration and feast day ==
Edmund Campion was beatified by Pope Leo XIII on 9 December 1886. Edmund Campion was canonised nearly eighty-four years later in 1970 by Pope Paul VI as one of the Forty Martyrs of England and Wales. His feast day is celebrated on 1 December, the day of his martyrdom.

The actual ropes used in his execution are now kept in glass display tubes at Stonyhurst College in Lancashire; each year they are placed on the altar of St Peter's Church for Mass to celebrate Campion's feast day—which is always a holiday for the school.

== Educational institutions named for Campion ==
- Campion House, Osterley, London
- The parish of St Edmund Campion, Bicester, Oxfordshire, England
- Campion Hall, Oxford, England
- The Campion School, Hornchurch, England
- Campion Hall, Seattle, Washington, United States
- Indo Scottish Global School, Kamothe, India
- St Edmund Campion Catholic Primary School, Maidenhead, Berkshire, England
- St Edmund Campion Catholic School, Erdington, Birmingham, England
- St Edmund Campion RC Primary School, West Bridgford, Nottingham, England
- St Edmund's Catholic Academy, Wolverhampton, England
- Campion Jesuit High School, Prairie du Chien, Wisconsin, United States
- St. Edmund Campion Academy, Cincinnati, Ohio, United States
- Campion College, Regina, Canada
- St. Edmund Campion Catholic School, Toronto, Ontario, Canada
- St. Edmund Campion Secondary School, Brampton, Ontario, Canada
- Campion College, Sydney, Australia
- Campion College, Gisborne, New Zealand
- Campion Anglo-Indian Higher Secondary School, Tiruchirappalli, Tamil Nadu, India
- Campion School, Mumbai, India
- Campion School, Bhopal, India
- Campion School, Kochi, India
- Campion School, Athens, Greece
- Campion College, Kingston, Jamaica
- Ocer Campion Jesuit College, Gulu, Uganda

== See also ==
- John Dolman (Jesuit)
- Robert Persons

== Sources ==
- Bombino, Pietro Paolo (1618). Vita et martyrium Edmundi Campiani e Societate Jesu. Antverpiæ: apud heredes Martini Nutii et Ioannem Meursium.
- Campion, Edmund. A Historie of Ireland, written in the yeare 1571., Dublin, 1633. Facsimile ed., 1940, Scholars' Facsimiles & Reprints, ISBN 978-0-8201-1191-9.
- De Backer, Bibliothèque de la Compagnie de Jesus, pp. 98–102. (A complete list of Edmund Campion's works) (in French and Latin), etc.
- Foley, Henry, S.J., Records of the English Province of the Society of Jesus. Vol. III. London: Burns and Oates (1878).
- Guiney, Louise Imogen, Blessed Edmund Campion, New York: Benziger Brothers (1908)
- Simpson, Richard, Edmund Campion: a Biography, London: Williams and Norgate (1867)
- Simpson, Richard, Edmund Campion, (1867). Revised, edited and enlarged by Peter Joseph, Gracewing/Freedom Press (2010) ISBN 978-0-85244-734-5
- Waugh, Evelyn, Edmund Campion, London: Williams and Norgate (1935). Sophia Institute Press (1996) ISBN 0-918477-44-1
- Wood, Anthony, 1632–1695, Athenae Oxonienses, cols 473–478, London, 1813.
