= Igreja de São Roque =

Jesuit church in Portugal

- View of the main façade of the church.

- Location within Lisbon

Religion
- Affiliation: Catholic Church
- Diocese: Lisbon District
- Region: Lisboa Region
- Leadership: Francisco Campos (since 2025)

Location
- Location: Largo Trindade Coelho, 1200-470 Lisboa, Portugal.
- Municipality: Lisbon
- Coordinates: 38°42′49″N 09°08′37″W

Architecture
- Type: Church
- Style: Baroque
- Groundbreaking: 1506; 520 years ago
- Completed: 1619; 407 years ago

The Igreja de São Roque ([ˈsɐ̃w ˈʁɔkɨ]; Church of Saint Roch) is a Catholic church in Lisbon, Portugal. It was the earliest Jesuit church in the Portuguese world, and one of the first Jesuit churches anywhere. The edifice served as the Society's home church in Portugal for over 200 years, before the Jesuits were expelled from that country. After the 1755 Lisbon earthquake, the church and its ancillary residence were given to the Lisbon Holy House of Mercy to replace their church and headquarters which had been destroyed. It remains a part of the Holy House of Mercy today, one of its many heritage buildings.

The Igreja de São Roque was one of the few buildings in Lisbon to survive the earthquake relatively unscathed. When built in the 16th century it was the first Jesuit church designed in the “auditorium-church” style specifically for preaching. It contains a number of chapels, most in the Baroque style of the early 17th century. The most notable chapel is the 18th-century Chapel of St. John the Baptist (Capela de São João Baptista), a project by Nicola Salvi and Luigi Vanvitelli constructed in Rome of many precious stones and disassembled, shipped, and reconstructed in São Roque; at the time it was reportedly the most expensive chapel in Europe.

== History ==
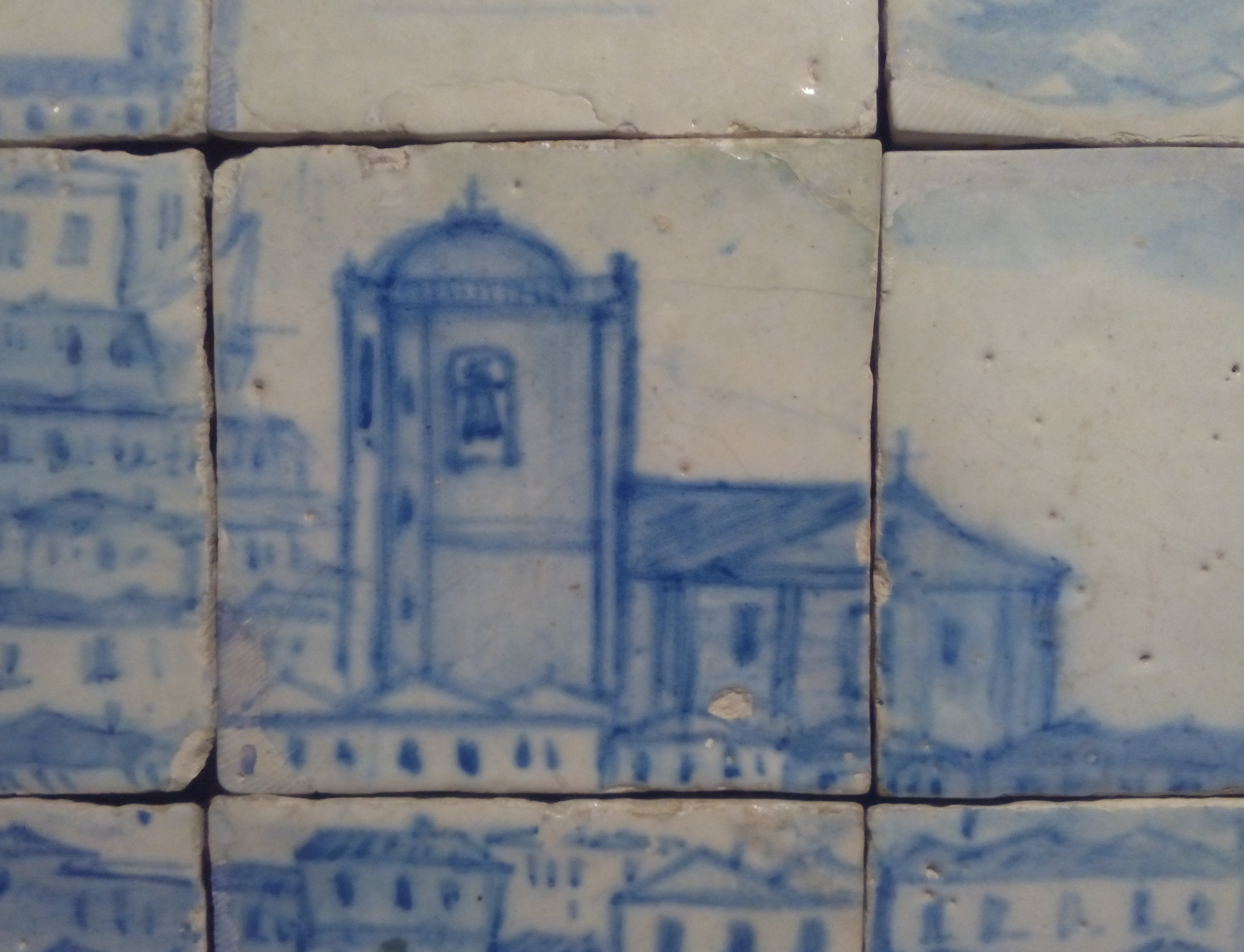
The Church of Saint Roch in an early 17th-century tile panel.

In 1505 Lisbon was being ravaged by the plague, which had arrived by ship from Italy. The king and the court were even forced to flee Lisbon for a while. The site of São Roque, outside the city walls (now an area known as the Bairro Alto), became a cemetery for plague victims. At the same time the King of Portugal, Manuel I (reigned 1495–1521), sent to Venice for a relic of St. Roch, the patron saint of plague victims, whose body had been translated to that city in 1485. The relic was sent by the Venetian government, and it was carried in procession up the hill to the plague cemetery.

The inhabitants of Lisbon then decided to erect a shrine on the site to house the relic; the shrine was begun on 24 March 1506 and dedicated on 25 February 1515. This early shrine was oriented from west to east, in the medieval tradition. A “Plague Courtyard” for the burial of plague victims adjoined the shrine and was formally dedicated on 24 May 1527 by Bishop Ambrósio. At about the same time a Brotherhood (or confraternity) of St. Roch was established to oversee and take care of the shrine. Made up of people from all classes, the Brotherhood still exists today, and maintains the Chapel of St. Roch in the present church.

In 1540, after the founding of the Society of Jesus in the 1530s, King John III (1521–1557) of Portugal invited them to come to Lisbon and the first Jesuits arrived in the same year. They settled first in the Hospital de Todos-os-Santos (All Saints Hospital — now destroyed) on the east side of Rossio Square and later in the College of São Antão (where the Hospital de São José is now situated). However, they soon began looking for a larger, more permanent location for their main church, and selected the Shrine of St. Roch as their favored site. After prolonged negotiations John III organized the relinquishment of the shrine to the Jesuits. The agreement with the Brotherhood, however, included the creation of a chapel for St. Roch in the new building, and the retention of St. Roch as the patron saint of the new church. The Society of Jesus took possession of the shrine on 1 October 1553 in a ceremony at which Fr. Francisco de Borja, SJ (St. Francis Borgia, 1510–1572) preached the sermon.

The small shrine was inadequate for the Jesuits and planning began immediately for a new church building. The king wanted a new monumental building with three naves but the Society favored a plan more in keeping with the principles enunciated by the Council of Trent, emphasizing simplicity and functionality. The first stone was laid in 1555, but the building was redesigned and expanded (its present version) in 1565. The royal architect, Afonso Álvares (1557–1575), appears to have supervised the work from 1566 to 1575, up to the level of the interior cornice. The work was carried on afterwards by his nephew, Baltasar Álvares (fl. 1570-1624), also royal architect. The building was completed by Filipe Térzi (Filippo Terzi, 1520–1597), royal architect to King Philip II of Spain (= Philip I of Portugal, 1580–1598); Térzi made modifications to the exterior façade, the ceiling and roof, and the interior finishings.

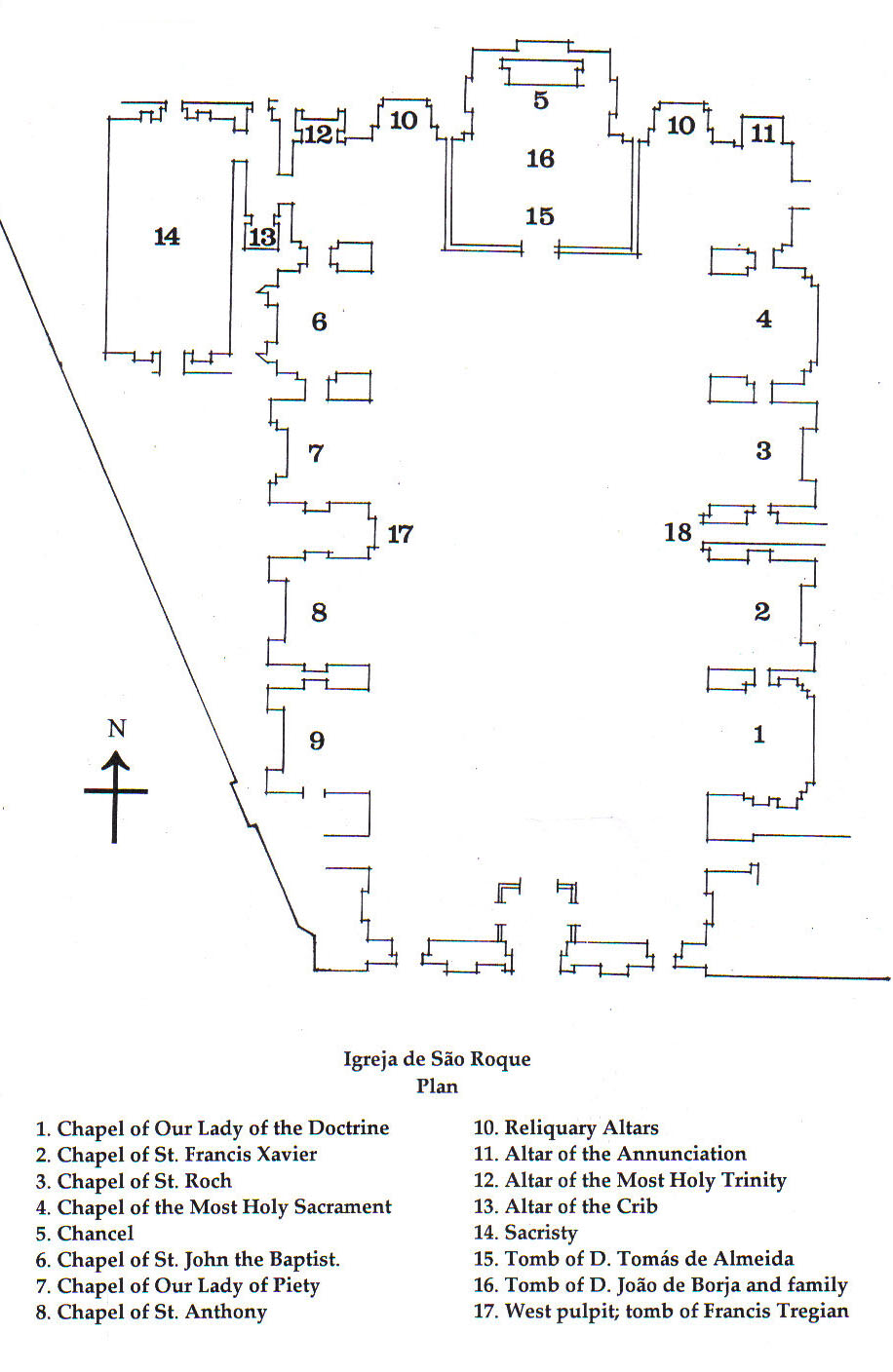
Igreja de São Roque: Floorplan

While the earlier shrine had been oriented from west to east in the medieval tradition, the new church was oriented south to north, across the older building. The plan of church is simple and spacious — a wide single nave, a shallow squared apse, virtually no transept, and raised pulpits between recessed galleries over side chapels. This style, the “auditorium-church” ideal for preaching, became popularly known as the “Jesuit style” and was widely copied by the order throughout Portugal and in the Portuguese colonial towns in Brazil and the Far East. The simple and sober exterior of the church, characteristic of the Portuguese “plain style” (estilo chão) contrasts with the highly decorated Baroque interior with its glazed tiles, gilt woodwork, multi-colored statues and oil paintings.

In 1759 the Jesuits — implicated in a revolt of the nobility against King Joseph I and his prime minister, the Marquis de Pombal (1699–1782) — were expelled from Portuguese territory by Pombal and the Igreja de São Roque was confiscated along with the attached buildings and residences. Nine years later, by a Royal Charter dated 8 February 1768, the property was given to the Lisbon Holy House of Mercy, whose original church and administrative buildings were destroyed by the 1755 earthquake.

The Holy House of Mercy still owns and operates the site today. The church continues to function, and part of the Jesuit residence was turned into a museum (the Museu de São Roque) late in the 19th century. Other parts of the complex, and later buildings erected adjacent to it, still function as the Holy House's headquarters for the city.

== Internal decoration ==
Nave looking toward the high altar

The decoration of the Igreja de São Roque is the result of several phases of activity throughout the 17th and 18th centuries, reflecting the ideals of either the Society of Jesus or, as in the case of the chapels, the respective brotherhoods or confraternities. It was born of the Catholic Reformation, and reflects the efforts of the Church to capture the attention of the faithful. The general decorative phases are Mannerist (the chapels of St. Francis Xavier, of the Holy Family, and of the chancel); early Baroque (Chapel of the Holy Sacrament); later Baroque (Chapels of Our Lady of the Doctrine and of Our Lady of Piety); and Roman Baroque of the 1740s (Chapel of St. John the Baptist). 19th-century renovations include the construction of the choir gallery over the main door where the pipe organ was installed; the remodeling of the screen of the Chapel of the Holy Sacrament and the erection of the gilded iron railings; also the replacement of the entrance doors.

Various parts of the church (e.g., the walls under the choir gallery and in the transept) are decorated with “diamond-point” tiles from the Triana district of Seville and dated by tradition to 1596. Elsewhere the tile decoration includes botanical elements, volutes, putti, symbols of the Passion, and the monogram of the Society of Jesus (“IHS”). In the niches above the two pulpits are white marble statues of the four Evangelists. Around the upper story of the nave is a cycle of oil painting depicting the life of Ignatius of Loyola (c. 1491 – 1556), founder of the Society of Jesus, attributed to Domingos da Cunha, the Cabrinha, a Jesuit painter of the early 17th century.

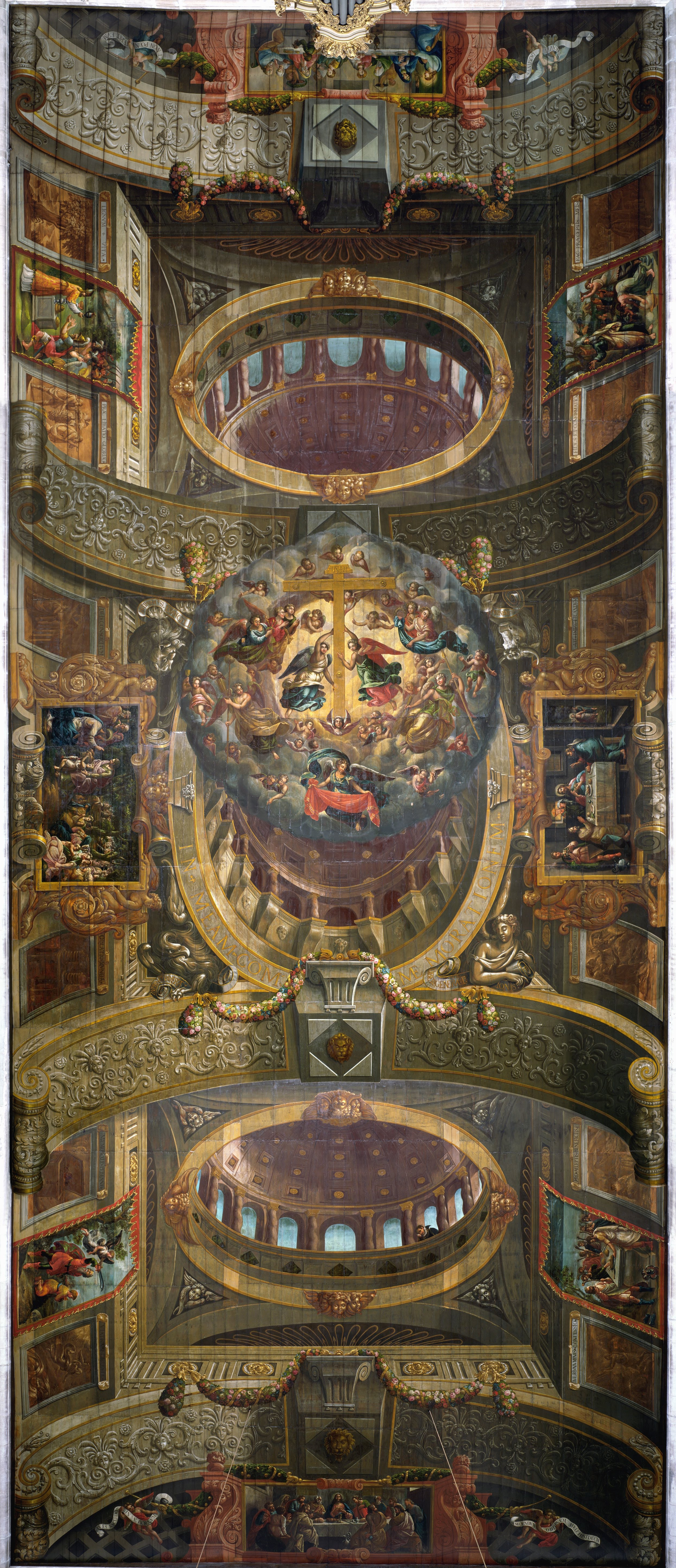
Trompe-l'œil Mannerist ceiling by Francisco Venegas and Amaro do Vale

The painted ceiling of the nave is a trompe-l'œil designed to give the illusion of barrel vaulting supported by four large arches covered in volutes and other decorative elements. Between the arches are painted squared balconies and “above” these balconies are three huge domes or cupolas rising on rings of open arches and columns. Most of this was painted between 1584 and 1586 by Francisco Venegas (fl. 1578-1590), royal painter to King Philip II. The Jesuits added the large central medallion (The Glorification of the Cross), as well as 8 large paintings and 12 monochrome panels depicting Biblical events. The ceiling near the front of the church was damaged in the 1755 earthquake and was rebuilt and repainted. The entire ceiling was restored in 2001 and the paint cleaned or repaired.

Nave looking toward the entrance and organ loft

The Baroque organ (with 1694 pipes) in the choir gallery over the main door was built in 1784 by António Xavier Machado e Cerveira and installed in the monastery church of São Pedro de Alcântara. In the 1840s it was moved to São Roque where it was set up in the east transept, completely obscuring the Altar of the Annunciation; it was relocated to the choir gallery in the 1890s. It has been substantially rebuilt several times.

== Chancel, Chapels and Altars ==
The church is made up of the chancel, eight main side-chapels in the church, as well as five other altars in the transepts.

=== Chancel ===
High altar

The work of carving, gilding and upholstery of the chancel was commissioned, at specific times, by three members of the Society of Jesus. The initial carving took three years (1625 to 1628) to complete. The gilding and upholstery of the carvings followed; and then the work in the area of the throne. The design of the altar piece is attributed to Teodósio de Frias and the carving to Master Jerónimo Correia.

The composition of the altar piece, with long proportions and decorative austerity, includes sets of paired Corinthian columns mounted in two levels. The lower third of each column is decorated with acanthus garlands, volutes and hanging objects. The semi-circular pinnacle incorporates a painting in the roundel, tempera on wood, representing Christ, Saviour of the World. The altar piece is one of the most important in the Jesuit tradition: the founder of the Society and its greatest saints — Ignatius of Loyola, Francis Xavier, Aloysius Gonzaga, and Francis Borgia — are represented in the four niches by statues, commissioned in 1630, which recently have been attributed to the Portuguese sculptor Manuel Pereira (1604–1667). The central niche of the lower portion of the altar piece houses a 17th-century statue of the Madonna and Child in upholstered wood. In front stand silvered wood statues of the four Evangelists. On the upper level is a niche for the exhibition of the Holy Sacrament — the “throne” (a characteristic Portuguese invention) usually covered by a large oil painting of a New Testament scene which changes according to the religious season. The practice of changing the scenography of the High Altar was a Jesuit innovation. The throne at São Roque (usually not visible to the public) was one of the first permanent ones to be created in Portugal. It has six Corinthian columns and four arches, round geometric elements and two large carved and gilded side panels with symbolic trees in relief. The whole forms a sort of pyramid in several levels.

The side walls supporting the vault over the altar are decorated (towards the front) with four niches containing statues, two on each side: St. Gregory Thaumaturgus (the Wonderworker) and Our Lady of the Conception, and St. Bridget and Ecce Homo (or “Our Lord of the Green Staff”). Towards the back along these side walls are four paintings representing St.Stanislaus Kostka, St. Paul Miki, St. John Martyr, and St. Diogo Martyr. The latter three are Jesuit saints martyred at Nagasaki, Japan, in 1597. See Caetano, Pintura, nos. 112-115 (vol. 1: 117-120). The attributed artist is Domingos da Cunha, the Cabrinha. The three martyrs are probably St. Paul Miki, St. John Soan de Goto, and St. Diogo (or James) Kisai (or Kizayemon), Jesuit brothers or "temporal coadjutor" in Japan.

In the centre of the platform in front of the chancel is the tomb of the first Patriarch of Lisbon, D. Tomás de Almeida, who was born in Lisbon in 1670 and died there in 1754. The tomb consists of a lead box covered with a grey marble gravestone with copper inlay, an inscription, and the Almeida coat of arms crowned by the patriarch́s tiara.

The right to be buried in a tomb built under the High Altar, as attested by a stone inscription, was given to D. João de Borja and his family. D. João de Borja, who died on 3 September 1606 in the Escorial in Spain, played an important role in the history of the Igreja de São Roque by creating a collection of reliquaries which he eventually gave to the church, some of which are exhibited in the Reliquary Altars.

=== Chapels ===
==== Chapel of Our Lady of the Doctrine ====
Chapel of Our Lady of the Doctrine

This chapel (the first chapel on the right of the nave), begun on 1 April 1634, was overseen by the Brotherhood of Our Lady of the Doctrine made up mostly of craftsmen and artisans. The main image in the altar piece is a late-16th-century painted wooden image of St. Anne with the Virgin Mary in her arms (an image known as Our Lady of the Doctrine, i.e., the Virgin Mary being indoctrinated by her mother). On the left and right side are late-17th-century sculptures of St. Joachim and St. Anne, parents of the Virgin Mary. Although built in the 17th century, the present decoration is typical of Portuguese Baroque (known as the “National Style” or “estilo nacional”) of the first half of the 18th century. The gilt woodwork (attributed to José Rodrigues Ramalho) covers the entire interior surface including the ceiling. It is characterized by popular Portuguese motifs — bunches of grapes, vine leaves, birds, and standing infants.

The breccia marble paneling and altar also display botanical, zoologic, anthropomorphic, geometric and allegoric motifs. This was executed by the master masons Manuel Antunes and João Teixeira and completed in 1690. The side recesses house reliquaries from the collection of D. João de Borja. The sculpture inside the glass case beneath the altar is of “Christ in Death” and dates from the 18th century.

==== Chapel of St. Francis Xavier ====
The second chapel on the right honoring the early Jesuit missionary to India and the Far East, St. Francis Xavier (1506–1552), was also done in 1634. Its decoration, dating to the first half of the 17th century, is typical of the Mannerist period: classical, sober and balanced. The altar piece is attributed to the master carver Jerónimo Correia. It contains a 17th-century image of Xavier in upholstered wood and is flanked by pairs of fluted Corinthian columns, whose lower thirds, as well as the friezes between the columns, are carved and gilded. The two oil paintings on the side walls, attributed to José de Avelar Rebelo (fl. 1635-57), depict Pope Paul III Receiving St. Francis Xavier and his Companions and St Francis Xavier Taking Leave of King John III Before Going to India in 1541.

==== Chapel of St. Roch ====
Chapel of Saint Roch

This chapel (the third chapel on the right) dates from the second half of the 16th century, from the time of the building of the Jesuit church. According to tradition the altar is said to stand on the site of the apse of the original plague shrine. The chapel is still administered by the original Brotherhood of St. Roch.

This chapel is different from the others: it is classical in structure and combines geometric architectural elements, a type of decoration reflecting contemporary taste and employing elements of the “National Style.” The type of gilt woodwork — gold elements on a white background — is unique in the decoration of the church. The altar piece was completed in 1707, replacing an earlier one which had fallen into disrepair. The central niche houses a statue in upholstered wood of St. Roch which, according to tradition, is the exact height of the saint (140 cm). The altar piece also includes sculptures of St. James and St. Sebastian, as well as six statuettes in silvered woods of the four Evangelists and Saints Peter and Paul.

The painting on the left side wall, The Appearance of the Angel to St. Roch (late 16th century), is considered to be one of the finest works by the Mannerist painter Gaspar Dias (c. 1560 – 1590).

The walls of the chapel are covered with majolica tiles, dated 1584 and signed by Francisco de Matos. They combine stylized naturalistic images with geometric patterns and iconographic elements related to St. Roch.

==== Chapel of the Most Holy Sacrament ====
Chapel of the Most Holy Sacrament

The fourth chapel on the right was founded in 1636. It was originally dedicated to Our Lady of the Assumption and then to Our Lady of the Conception and Relief for Those in Agony. The wrought iron grille was erected in 1894 when the Holy Sacrament was moved from the High Altar to this chapel.

The present decoration dates from the late 17th and early 18th centuries. The altar piece was carved by the Lisbon master carver Matias Rodrigues de Carvalho. The Portuguese Baroque lacework and the crown of angel heads flanking the central sculpture of Our Lady of the Assumption date from the 18th century. In the altar piece are also a number of reliquary busts, many with connections to the Society of Jesus. The breccia marble on the lower third of the walls was executed by the Lisbon master masons José Freire and Luís dos Santos and finished in 1719.

==== Chapel of the Holy Family ====
This chapel (the first chapel on the left), begun also in 1634, belonged to a confraternity of noblemen. The classical style of the chapel is similar to that of the chancel. The altar piece is also attributed to Jerónimo Correia, and the painting in it, Jesus Among the Doctors, is attributed to José Avelar Rebelo (fl. 1635-57); the sculptures are of Jesus, Mary and Joseph. The two paintings on the flanking walls — The Adoration of the Magi and The Adoration of the Shepherds — are both attributed to the early Baroque artist, André Reinoso (c. 1590 – after 1641).

==== Chapel of St. Anthony ====
Chapel of Saint Anthony

The second chapel on the left, dedicated to St. Anthony of Padua (c. 1195 – 1231), was instituted by Pedro Machado de Brito, who left a legacy requesting that he and his descendants be buried here. It was built in 1635 but partly destroyed in the earthquake of 1755. Its decoration reflects the early classical and geometric style of the chancel, Baroque elements of the 18th century, and the restoration efforts of the 19th century. The multicoloured statue of St. Anthony is of upholstered wood of the Mannerist period. On the side walls are two 18th-century paintings by Vieira Lusitano (1699–1783), royal painter to King John V: St. Anthony Preaching to the Fish and The Temptation of St. Anthony and his Vision of the Virgin.

==== Chapel of Our Lady of Piety ====
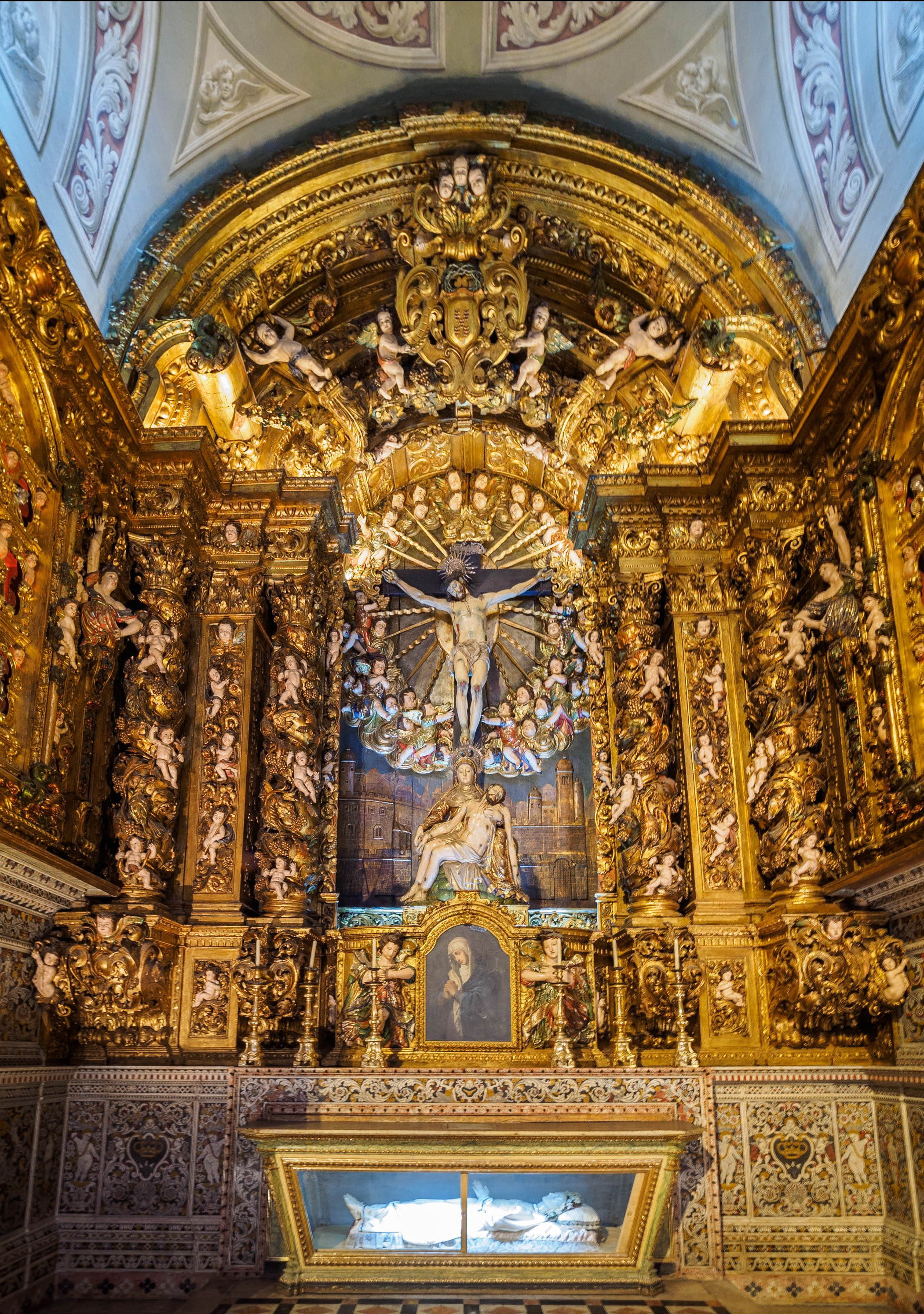
Chapel of Our Lady of Piety

This chapel (the third on the left) is also the burial place of its founder, Martim Gonçalves da Câmara (1539–1613), a royal official of King Sebastian. The actual construction and decoration of this chapel, begun in 1686 and finished in 1711, was overseen by the Brotherhood of Our Lady of Piety.

The altar piece dates from 1708 and is the work of master carver Bento da Fonseca de Azevedo. The design revolves around a central representation of “Calvary” surrounded by a “lace” of angels in upholstered wood on a bas-relief background made of plaster painted with tempera and gilt that probably represents Jerusalem. A beautiful 17th-century sculpture of the Pietà in upholstered wood completes the tribune. The central part of the altar piece is flanked by two pairs of twisted pseudo-solomonic columns with decorated panels in between.

Niches with 18th-century upholstered and coloured sculptures of saints — Longinus on the right and Veronica on the left — are found in the sides of the entrance arch. This was a new aspect contributing to the beginnings of a theatre-like taste in the decoration of churches in Portugal. In this case, these saints act like spectators of the central scene: Calvary and the Pietà against a scenic background painted on the panel that closes the altar piece. The monumental sacrarium with a painting of Our Lady of Pain and the “lace” of angels surrounding the rays from the crucifix are typical elements of the Lisbon school of decoration. In the glass case beneath the altar is a 19th-century sculpture of Our Lady of the Happy Death. On the side walls are several niches housing reliquaries from the collection of D. João de Borja, framed and flanked by two pairs of caryatids, allegorical and theatrical figures characteristic of early-18th-century taste.

This chapel, displaying the influence of Italian Baroque, marks the transition between Portuguese Mannerism in its last phase and the succeeding style, typical of John V's reign, which used a Baroque vocabulary. Seen as the initiation of this change in Portugal, the Chapel of Our Lady of Piety influenced the decoration and composition of several other important chapels elsewhere in the country.

==== Chapel of St. John the Baptist ====
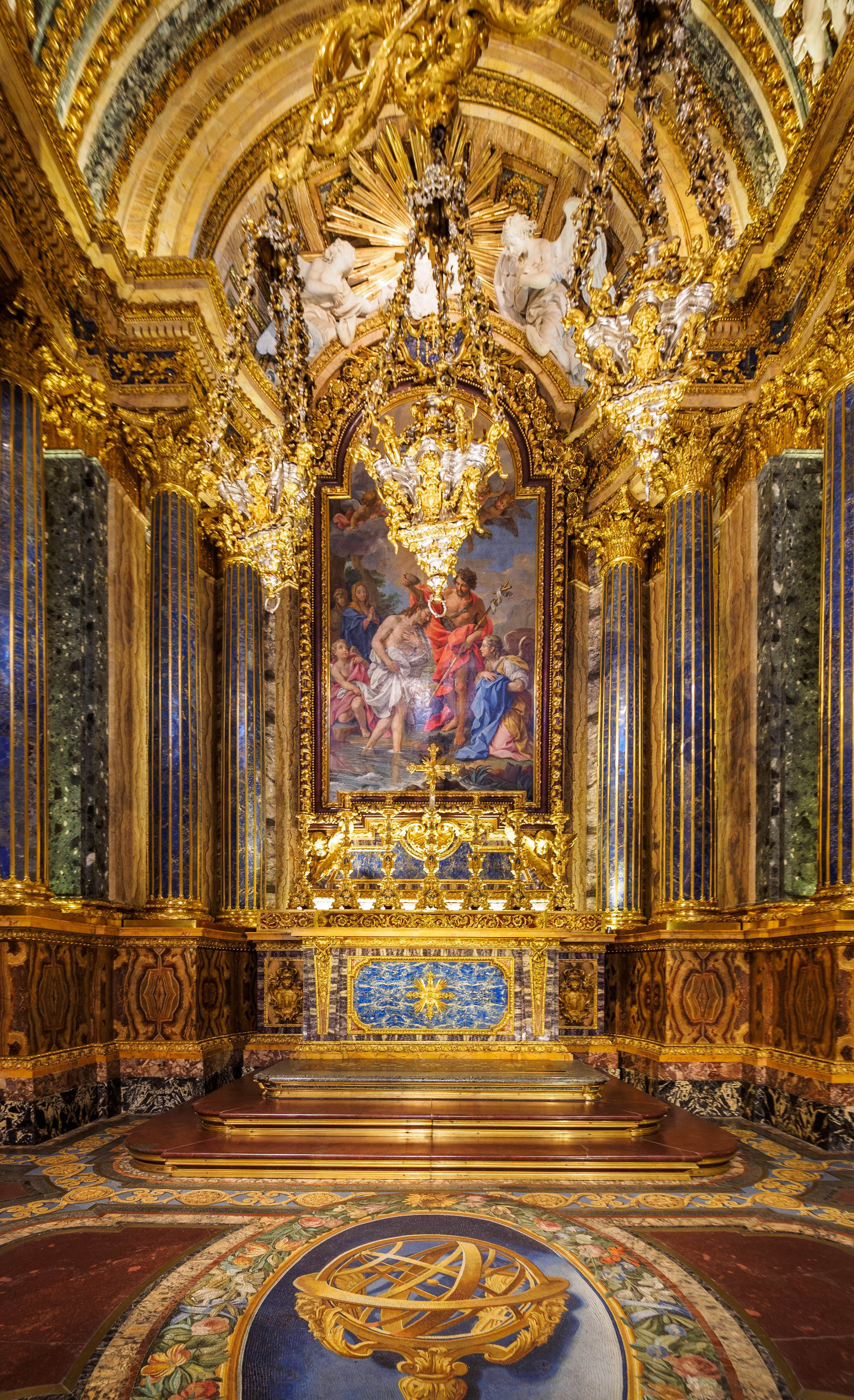
Chapel of Saint John the Baptist

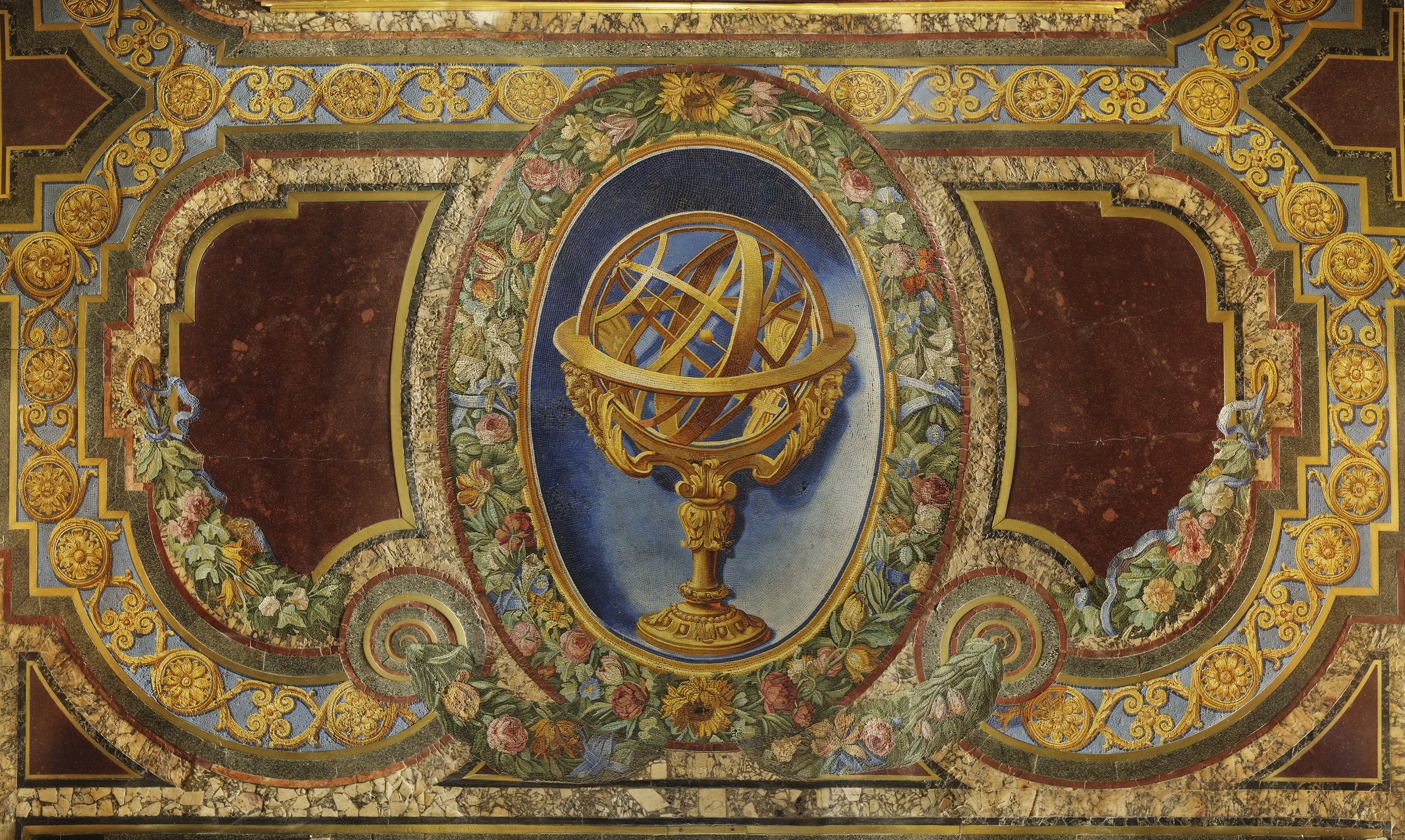
Mosaic floor of the Chapel of St John the Baptist. The armillary sphere has been a national symbol of Portugal since the reign of King Manuel I, an allusion to the Portuguese Age of Discovery.

This chapel (Capela de São João Baptista) was commissioned in 1740 by King John V. Upon completion, it was said to be the most expensive chapel in Europe, funded with the gold and other wealth that flowed to Portugal from Brazil. The designs and material were assembled under the direction of the architects Luigi Vanvitelli (1700–1773) and Niccolo Salvi (1697–1751). Vanvitelli modified his original design according to drawings sent to Italy by architect João Frederico Ludovice (1673–1752). Hundreds of different artists and craftsmen worked on its construction. It was assembled in the Church of St. Anthony of the Portuguese (Sant'Antonio dei Portoghesi) in Rome beginning in 1742. Consecrated by Pope Benedict XIV on 15 December 1744, it was sufficiently finished that the pontiff could say Mass in it on 6 May 1747. In September of that year, Manuel Pereira de Sampaio, Portuguese ambassador to the Holy See, saw to the dismantling of the chapel and its transport by three ships to Lisbon, where it was reassembled in São Roque in what was formerly the 17th-century Chapel of the Holy Ghost. Reassembly was overseen by Francesco Feliziani and Paolo Niccoli (or Riccoli), along with the Italian sculptor Alessandro Giusti (1715–1799). The assembly of the mosaic panels depicting the Baptism of Christ and Pentecost were not completed until August 1752, two years after the death of John V.

The chapel introduced the then new rocaille or rococo style into Portugal. The decorative elements of rocaille inspiration — festoons, garlands, angels — combined with the classical austerity of the structural composition formed the basis of an evolving taste that would decide the future trends of Portuguese gilt woodwork. The use of columns with straight channelled shafts with gilt fillets on a lapis lazuli background, the austerity of geometric lines reinforced by the use of precious marbles and mosaics, and the rocaille decoration illustrate the combination of innovations introduced by this chapel into the Portuguese decorative tradition.

The side panels — Annunciation and Pentecost — and the central panel — The Baptism of Christ — as well as the floor (displaying an armillary sphere), are mosaics, remarkable for their nuances and for their sense of perspective. The tessellae used in the three wall panels are about 3 mm in size; those in St. John's beard are only 2 mm; those in the floor are 5 mm. The models for the three panels were made by Agostino Masucci (1691–1758), and the mosaic themselves by Mattia Moretti (d. 1779). Enrigo Enuo designed the mosaic on the floor.

Precious materials were demanded by the Portuguese court; thus we find several types of ornamental stones: lapis lazuli, agate, antique green, alabaster, Carrara marble, amethyst, purple porphyry, green porphyry, French white-black, ancient breccia, diaspore, and Persian gold-yellow, to name just a few. Besides the various marbles and mosaics, gilt bronze was also used, and the last step of the altar platform is done in marquetry of precious woods and ivory.

The Chapel of St. John the Baptist is an Italian (Roman) work of art, complete and uniform in its own specific style. Besides the architectural monument of the chapel itself, other pieces used in worship, with similar high technical and artistic quality, were created: church vestments, ornaments, lacework and books. The Museu de São Roque (Museum of St. Roch) houses the model for the chapel, as well as some examples of the clothing, books and metalwork associated with it.

=== Tomb of Francis Tregian ===
Beneath the west pulpit, between the Chapel of St. Anthony and the Chapel of Our Lady of Piety, is the upright tomb of Francis Tregian (1548–1608), a leading English Catholic recusant. (Tregian was initially interred beneath the floor of the nave in front of the Chapel of the Holy Sacrament. An inscribed stone still marks that spot.) The inscription on the present tomb, translated, reads:

Here stands the body of Master Francis Tregian, a very eminent English gentleman who — after the confiscation of his wealth and after having suffered much during the 28 years he spent in prison for defending the Catholic faith in England during the persecutions under Queen Elizabeth — died in this city of Lisbon with great fame for saintliness on December 25th, 1608. [sic] On April 25th, 1625, after being buried for 17 years in this church of São Roque which belongs to the Society of Jesus, his body was found perfect and incorrupt and he was reburied here by the English Catholics resident in this city, on April 25th, 1626.

=== Reliquary altars ===
São Roque's collection of 16th and 17th-century reliquaries are now exhibited in the two reliquary altars, Holy Martyrs (male) on the left or Gospel side and Holy Martyrs (female) on the right or Epistle side. These flank the chancel as well as being partially integrated into the decoration of some of the other chapels. Many are associated with the Society of Jesus.

Most are gifts of D. João (or Juan) de Borja (1533–1606). second son of St. Francis Borgia (1510–1572). He was sent as Castilian ambassador of Philip II to the Imperial court in Prague of Rudolf II of Saxony, and later to Rome. D. João was able to assemble a first-rate collection of relics from, among other places, Rome, Hungary, Bohemia and Cologne which he brought back to the Escorial where he drew up a deed of gift to the Igreja de São Roque in 1587. In return the grateful Jesuits allowed the donors – D. João and his wife as well as their descendants — to be buried in the main chapel.

The reliquaries at St. Roch are of different shapes, generally depending on the relic they house: arms, male and female torsos, urns, ostensories, chests. The majority, with their pontifical certificates and letters, are of great historical and artistic value. The glass cases holding the reliquaries were created in 1898 at the time of the commemoration of the fourth centenary of the creation of the Sacra Casa da Misericórdia of Lisbon.

==== Altar of the Annunciation ====
The small Altar of the Annunciation (the former Chapel of Our Lady of Exile) in the right/east transept is so named because it houses a Mannerist painting by Gaspar Dias (c. 1560 – 1590), the theme of which is The Annunciation of the Angel Gabriel to the Virgin Mary. Destroyed in the 18th century and later obscured by Cerveira's Baroque pipe organ, the altar was rebuilt in the 1890s.

D. António de Castro, a priest of São Roque, requested that this altar be built as his tomb; this was done by his father, D. João de Castro. D. António died on 8 September 1632 and was buried here. D. António de Castro also requested that his family and his former teacher at the College of Coimbra, the famous Jesuit philosopher Francisco Suárez (1548—1617) who died in the Jesuit residence at São Roque, be buried here as well. Suarez is known as a precursor of modern theories of international law.

==== Altar of the Most Holy Trinity ====
This altar in the left/west transept was commissioned in 1622 by Gonçalo Pires de Carvalho, Overseer of Royal (i.e., Public) Works, and his wife, D.ª Camila de Noronha, as their tomb and as the tomb of their household, according to an inscription on the stone step. It was built in the Mannerist style, similar to innumerable retables surviving in Roman churches, such as St. Peteŕs and the Church of the Gesù. It is the oldest surviving altar piece in a Jesuit church in Portugal, remarkable in its precocious use of marbles inlaid with colour. At the centre of the alar piece is a highly dramatic sculpture with distinct Baroque characteristics of Our Lady of Mercy, or Pietà, in colourful upholstered wood of the 18th century.

==== Altar of the Crib ====
The central theme of this 17th-century altar (left transept/entrance to the sacristy) is the crib of Jesus. The engraved silver manger is in the form of a reliquary and contains fragments of wood from the crib in Santa Maria Maggiore in Rome, given by Pope Clement VIII (1592–1605) to Fr. João Álvares, Assistant of the Society of Jesus in Portugal. The silverwork, dated 1615, was offered by D.ª Maria Rolim da Gama, wife of Luís da Gama, who bequeathed a large sum of money for the creation of the reliquary. The picture in the roundel above the altar, representing a group of angels, is attributed to Bento Coelho da Silveira (c. 1630 – 1708).

=== Sacristy ===
The sacristy (off the left/west transept) is important for being one of the earliest sacristies constructed by the Society of Jesus, conceived in line with the liturgical recommendations emanating from the Council of Trent. Church sacristies took on the added function of “art galleries” for the edification of the faithful. The Jesuits of St. Roch were in the forefront of this development.

Along the side walls of the sacristy are two large, valuable 17th-century chests of drawers made of jacaranda and of rosewood overlaid with ebony and inlaid with ivory. The walls are almost completely covered with three rows of valuable paintings laid out in superimposed friezes up to the vaulted ceiling. The lowest row of twenty paintings, considered to be the most important, recounts incidents and miracles in the life of St. Francis Xavier, especially his travels to the Far East. They were executed by the 17th-century Portuguese Mannerist painter André Reinoso (c. 1590 – after 1641) and his collaborators. The cycle was completed in 1619, the year St. Francis Xavier was recognized as Blessed, and was part of a Jesuit propaganda program to promote his canonization (which finally occurred in 1622).

The middle row dating back to the 18th century is attributed to André Gonçalves. It depicts various stages of the Passion of Christ interlaced with allegoric paintings captioned with Biblical passages. These pieces were old processional banners, commissioned in 1761 by the Lisbon Holy House of Mercy from Gonçalves; later on they were taken apart and arranged as pictures in the sacristy. In the upper frieze the paintings are of scenes from the life of St. Ignatius of Loyola, founder of the Society of Jesus. They came here from the now-defunct Jesuit novitiate at Cotovia and are attributed to Domingos da Cunha, the Cabrinha.

The ceiling of the sacristy is composed of a round vault divided into coffers decorated with 17th-century frescos which contain emblems with Biblical symbols alluding to the Virgin Mary, later integrated into a “Litany of the Virgin.”

== Other burials ==
- Nicholas Skerrett, Archbishop of Tuam in Ireland from 1580 to 1583

== See also ==
- List of Jesuit sites
- Procession of Our Lord of the Passion of Graça
