= The Appearance of the Angel to Saint Roch =

1584 painting by Gaspar Dias

The Appearance of the Angel to St. Roch
- Aparição do Anjo a S. Roque (Portuguese)
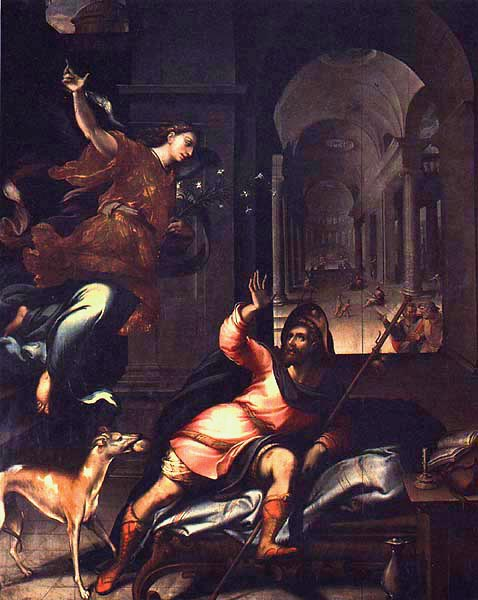
- Artist: Gaspar Dias
- Year: 1584
- Medium: oil on canvas
- Dimensions: 350 cm × 300 cm (140 in × 120 in)
- Location: Museu de São Roque; Lisbon

The Maiden of the Grave (Portuguese: Aparição do Anjo a S. Roque) is an oil on canvas painting by Gaspar Dias, from 1584.

== Description ==
The painting has the overall dimensions of 350 by 300 centimetres (140 in × 120 in). It is in the collection of the Igreja de São Roque, in Lisbon.

== Analysis ==
The scene shows an angel visitation to Saint Roch for survival during a time of plague.
