= Campion House =

Coordinates: 51.4803°N 0.3471°W

- Campion House College, Osterley
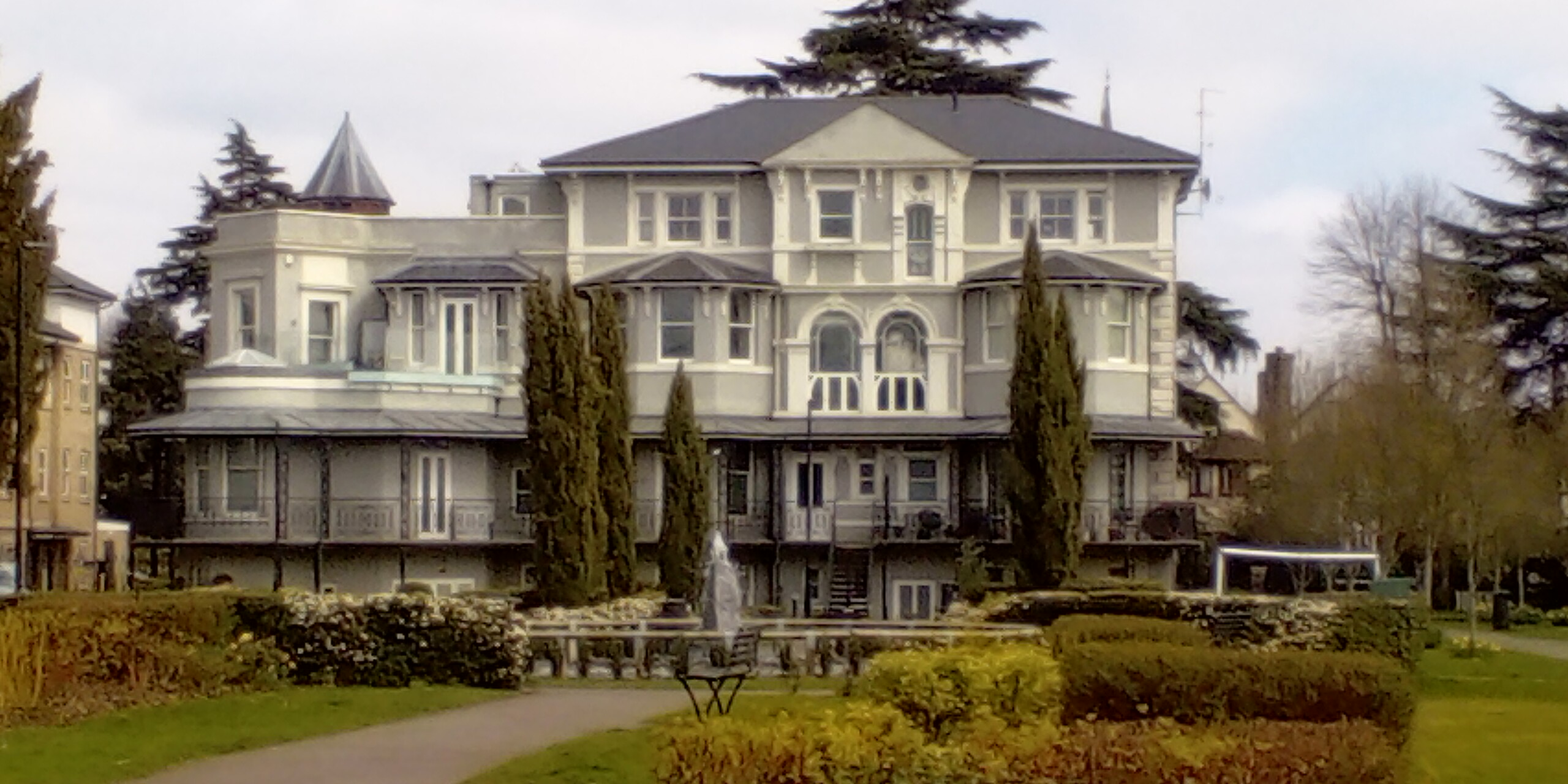

- Location in the London Borough of Hounslow
- OS grid reference: TQ 14880 77000
- Location: Osterley, London
- Country: England
- Denomination: Roman Catholic

History
- Former name: Thornbury House
- Status: Closed
- Founded: 1911
- Founder: Fr Edmund Lester SJ
- Dedication: Edmund Campion

Architecture
- Functional status: Private Houses
- Closed: 12 May 2004

Administration
- Province: Westminster
- Archdiocese: Westminster
- Deanery: Hounslow
- Parish: St Vincent de Paul, Osterley

Campion House was a Roman catholic college run by the Society of Jesus in the Archdiocese of Westminster. It was situated in Osterley on the Thornbury Road, off the A4 road, in the London Borough of Hounslow.

== History ==
=== Foundation ===
It was originally a Victorian mansion called Thornbury House. In 1911, it came under the ownership of the Society of Jesus as a retreat house. It supplied weekend retreats in Ignatian spirituality for working men's sodalities and parish groups.

In 1915, Fr Edmund Lester SJ took over as director of the house. After the First World War he saw a dramatic increase in the number of vocations from veterans of the First World War, so he changed the name of the house to Campion House College and turned it into a sort of 'pre-seminary', a house of studies, a place to help young men, between 18 and 40 who had a late vocation to learn Latin and to further their education, helping them progress in their training for the priesthood. The college was not just for the Jesuits but also students from all the Catholic dioceses of England and Wales, other religious orders and even from outside of the UK.

The college provided its own newsletter Stella Maris which was read by some of the soldiers within the British Armed Forces.

=== Second World War ===
In 1935, Fr Clem Tigar SJ replaced Fr Lester as director of the college. Again, after the Second World War, the number of students drastically increased. So the stable and coach-house of the mansion were converted into a dormitory called Bethlehem. As the number of applicants continued to increase, appeals were made for funds to build extra accommodation. Other additions were made such as a statue, immediately to the south of the house, called the 'Ghost' or 'Descent from the Cross'. It is a Grade II listed sculpture, designed by Andrew O'Connor in 1937, and was displayed in the Tate Gallery, London. On 11 November 1953, it was presented to the college by Fr. Martin Cyril D'Arcy S.J.

In the early 1960s, over 160 men were annually being trained. So it was decided to make the college permanent and for it to serve all men who had a late vocation. In 1960, a new appeal was launched by Fr Tigar, to raise £250,000 to build a permanent college containing dormitories, classrooms, common rooms and a library, so it could accommodate 140 residential students during a two-year course in English, Latin, Greek, French and European history. Life at the college in the 1980s was described by Greg Watts in his memoir The Long Road Out of Town.

=== Closure ===
However, from the 1970s, student numbers lessened and more space became available. So some of the buildings were used by the Jesuit Refugee Service to accommodate Vietnamese refugees. Later, it was used to also house migrants from Eritrea and Kosovo. as well as Kurds.

From 1918, around 1,500 of the men trained at Osterley had gone on to become priests. However, by the turn of the 21st century, students numbers had gone down and the house was used more and more as a retreat centre. So in April 2004, it was announced that it would close. Its closure was marked on 12 May 2004 by a Mass at Westminster Cathedral led by the Archbishop of Westminster, Cardinal Cormac Murphy-O'Connor, alongside bishops and archbishops from throughout England and Wales.

== Later history ==
After its closure, Campion House was sold to a housing development company. In 2008, plans to convert the site and surrounding area into a housing development were refused by Hounslow London Borough Council because councillors raised concerns about the buildings encroaching on land classified as public open space and the lack of family housing provided.

Eventually, amended plans were approved for the development of private houses in the grounds of Campion House.

== Gallery ==
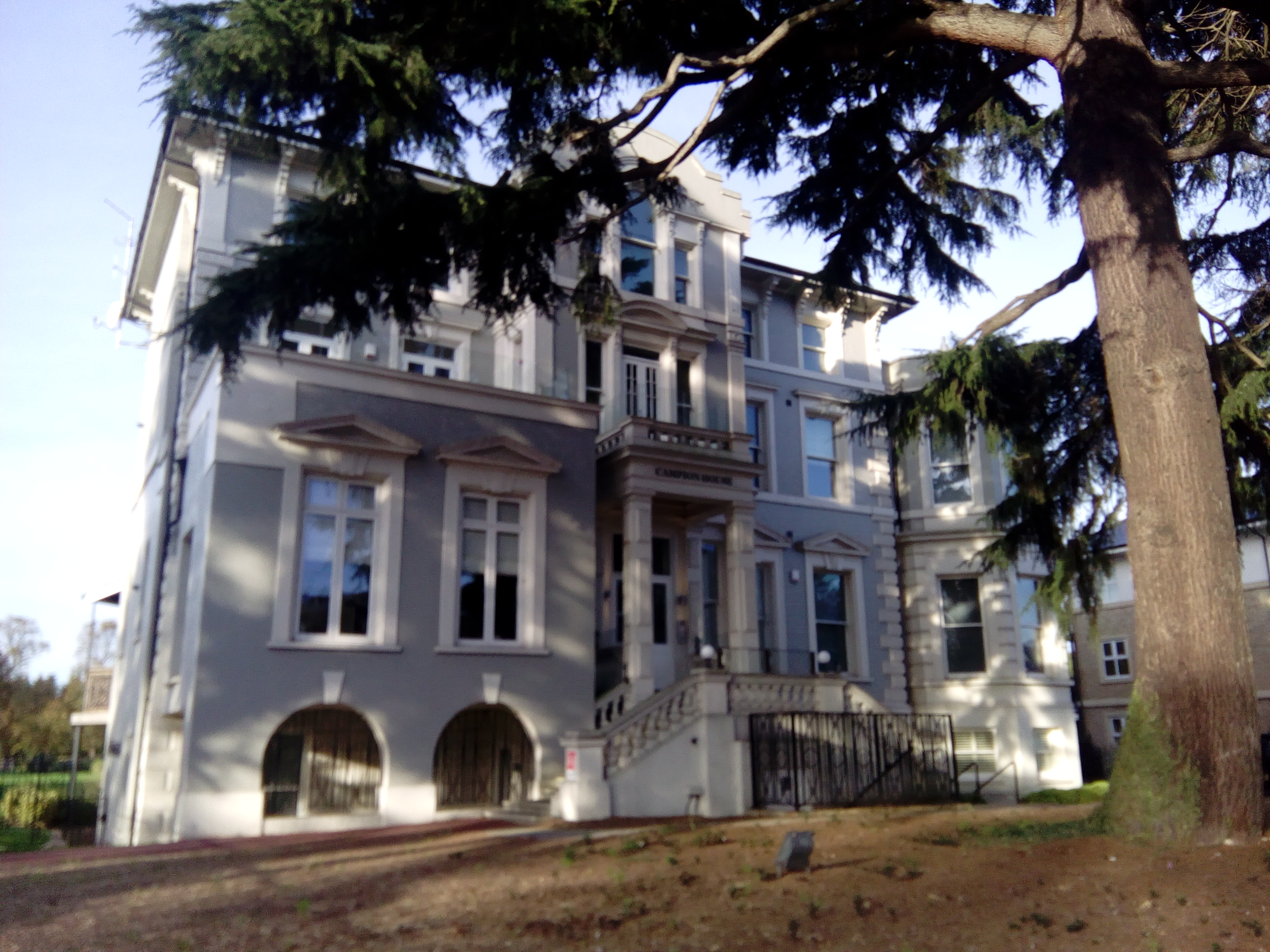
Building front

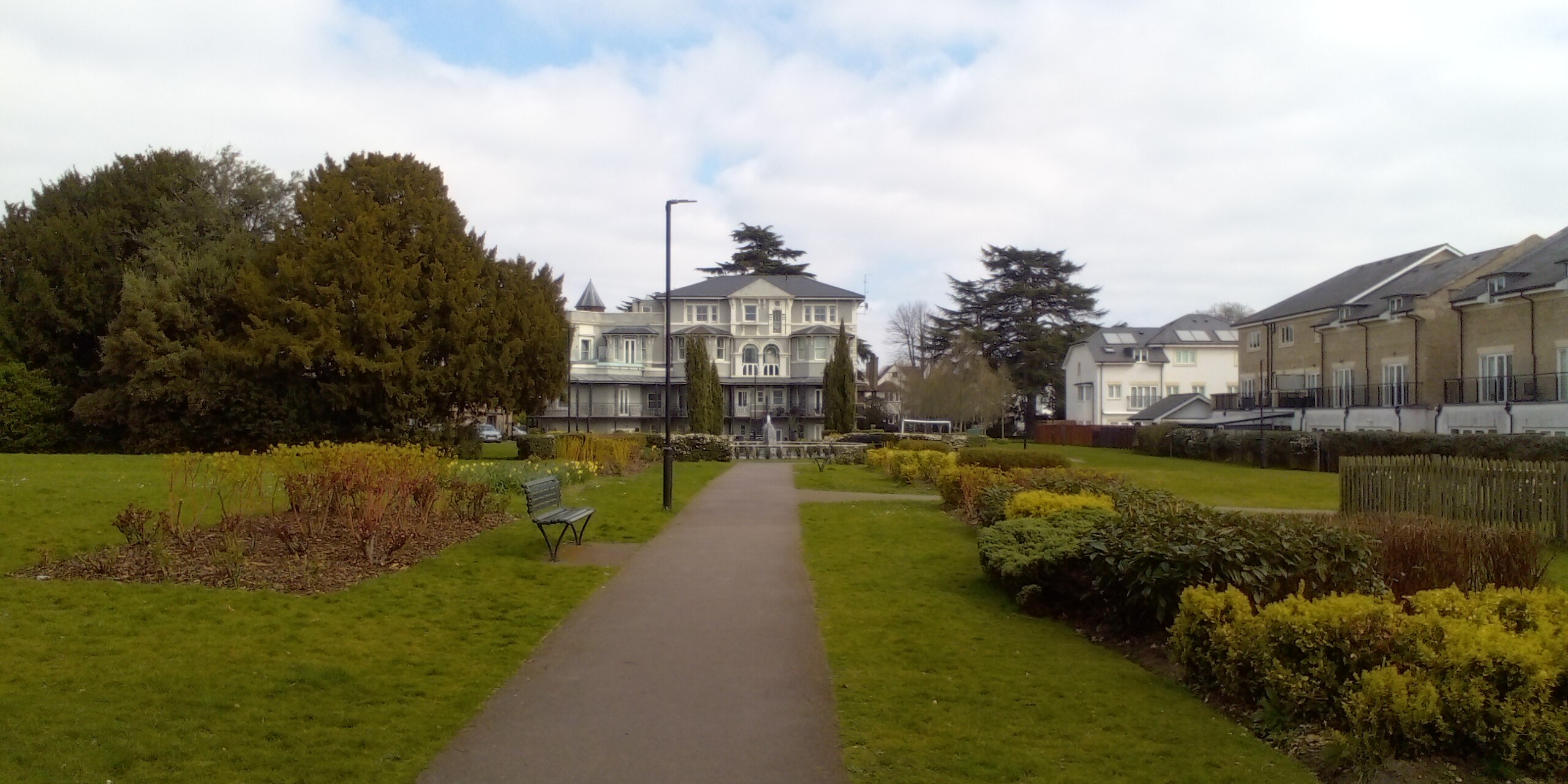
Building and park

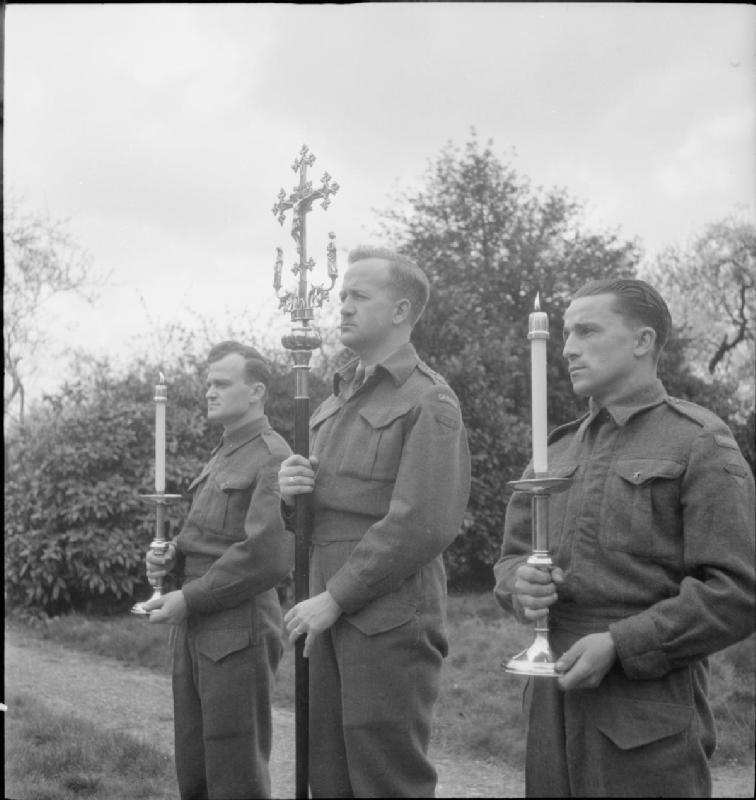
Canadian servicemen at Campion House in 1943.

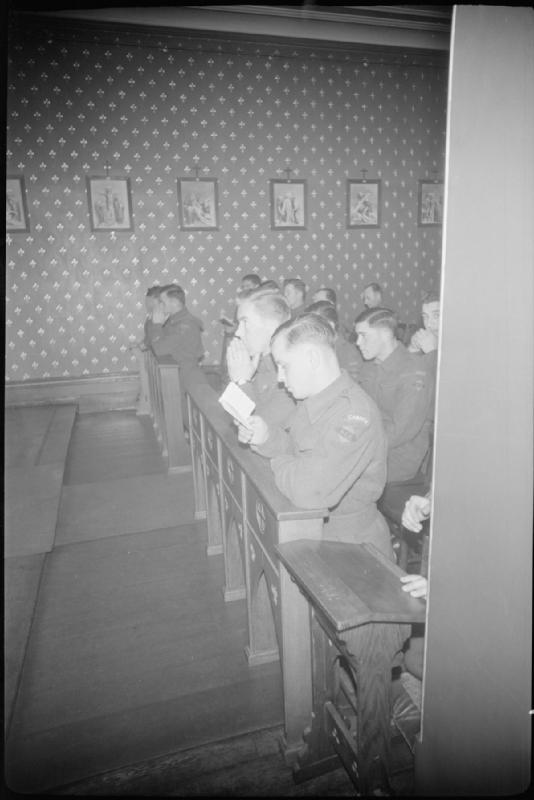
The chapel in 1943

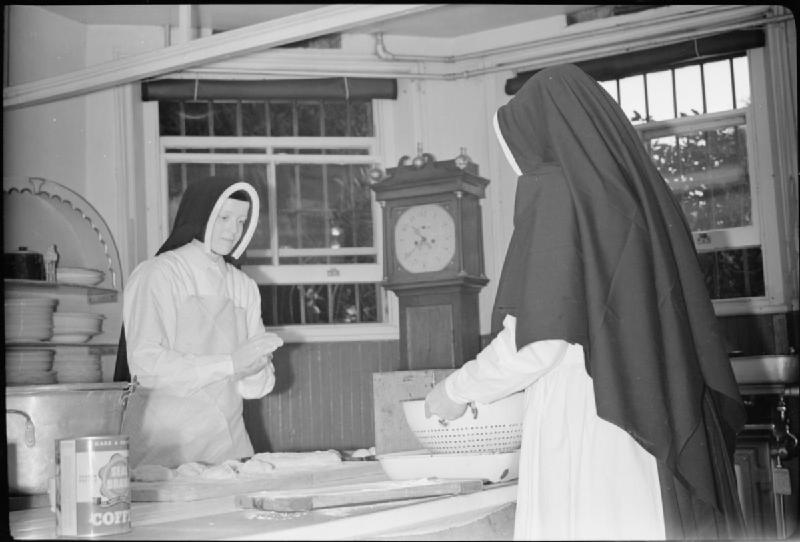
The kitchen in 1943

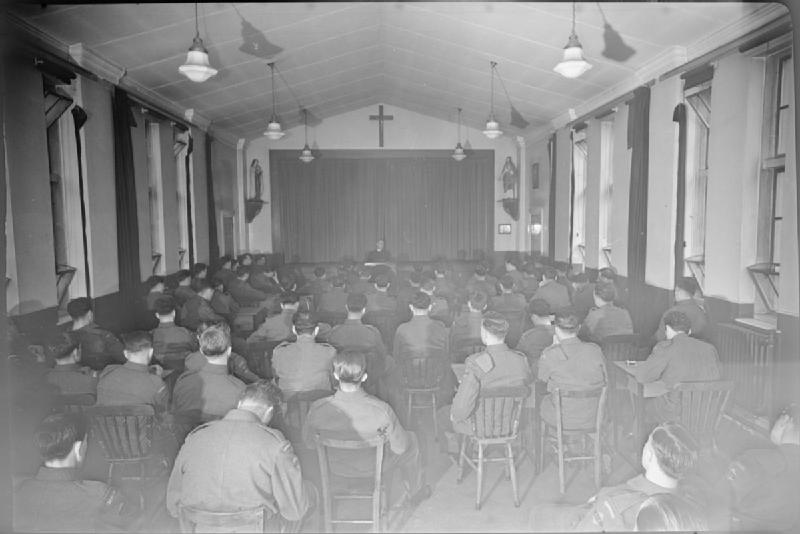
Students Study Hall

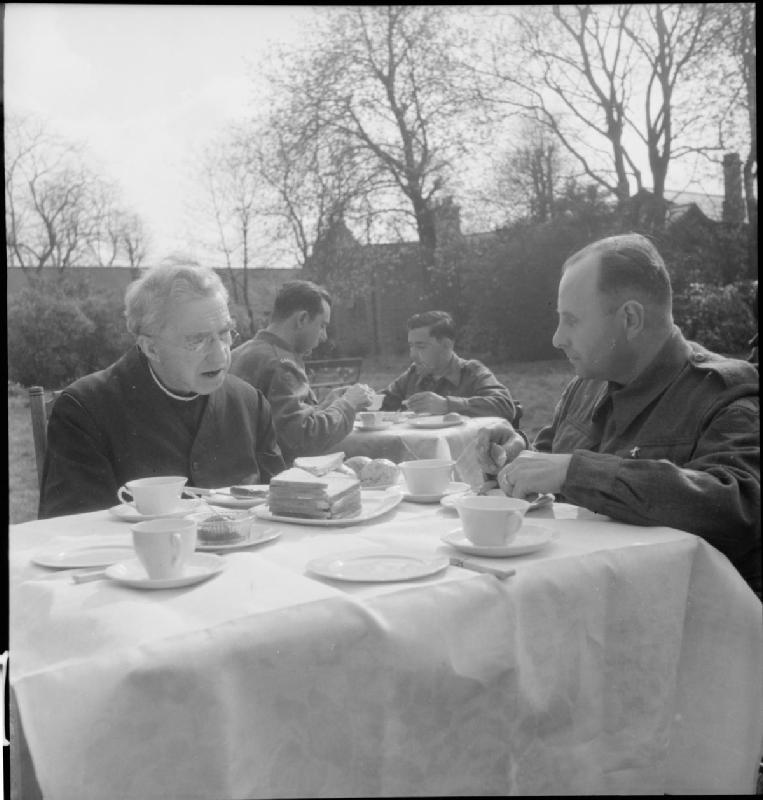
Lunch on the Campion House lawn

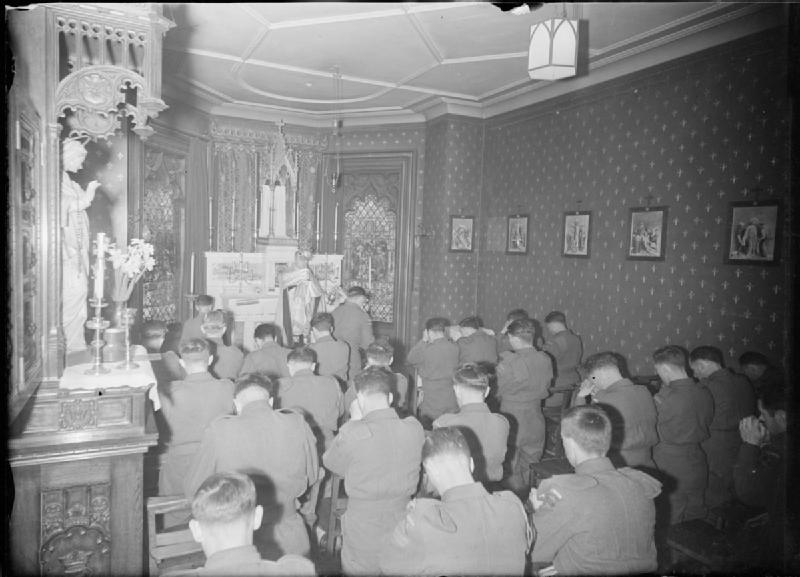
View of the chapel

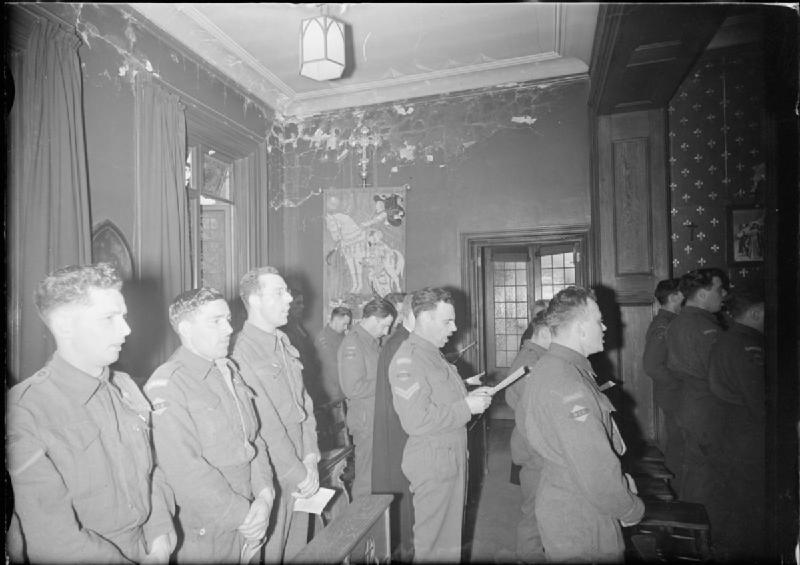
Rear of the chapel

== See also ==
- List of Jesuit sites
