= Our Lady's Catholic High School, Fulwood =

Our Lady's Catholic High School

Location
- St Anthony's Drive; Preston, Lancashire, PR2 3SQ; England
- Coordinates: 53.781200°N 2.726000°W

Information
- Type: Voluntary aided school
- Religious affiliation: Roman Catholic
- Established: 1988 (merger)
- Local authority: Lancashire
- Department for Education URN: 119779 Tables
- Ofsted: Reports
- Head teacher: Richard Charnock
- Age: 11 to 16
- Enrolment: 890~
- Website: www.olchs.lancs.sch.uk

Our Lady's Catholic High School is a Roman Catholic secondary school, situated in Fulwood, a suburb in the city of Preston in Lancashire, England. It is located close to the affiliated St Anthony's Church and St Anthony's RC Primary School. The current headteacher is Richard Charnock.

== History ==
Our Lady's was founded as a result of a merger between two schools: St Edmund Campion School and St Cuthbert Mayne High School (known as Blessed Cuthbert Mayne High before Cuthbert Mayne was canonised). While in the school's early years, both campuses were used, the school is now based at the original St Cuthbert Mayne site in Fulwood.

In 2004 Our Lady's became a Mathematics and Computing School, and in 2014 it became the lead-school of the Catholic Teaching Alliance, an association of over 50 Catholic schools.

In January 2018, Our Lady's underwent a Section 48 Inspection by the Diocese of Lancaster Education Service. The school received scores of 1 for both Religious Education and Catholic Life, indicating an outstanding result.

In September 2022, Our Lady's was rated Good in all areas by Ofsted.

In 2023, the school was one of those identified as having buildings that could be structurally unsound because reinforced autoclaved aerated concrete had been used in their construction.

== Notable former pupils ==
Our Lady's Catholic High School

- Ian Bibby, cyclist.
- Hugh Carthy, cyclist.
- Dominic Lyne, author
- Scott Fitzgerald (boxer), professional boxer.

St Cuthbert Mayne

- Nick Park, filmmaker and animator. Opened the Learning Resource Centre in 2007.
