= John Dolman (Jesuit) =

French Jesuit

John Dolman of Pocklington (c. 1556 - aft 1590, Pont-à-Mousson, Meurthe-et-Moselle, France), son of Sir Thomas Dolman of Pocklington by Elizabeth Vavasour, was a catholic Jesuit, witness of the persecution of Saint Edmund Campion.

From :, Volume 2 pages 90 to 93 :

After witnessing Fr. Campion's martyrdom at Tyburn, Dec. 1, 1581, and perhaps seeing his notes through the press, John Dolman, a young student at Gray's Inn, managed to evade the pursuivants in search of him, and crossed over ('gone over the seas') to Reims, where he was received at the College by Dr. Allen, May 6, 1582. It was probably he who brought to the College some relics of Fr. Campion. For six days later Dr. Allen wrote to Mr. George Gilbert, at the English College in Rome, informing him that Mr. Dolman had turned off to Rheims instead of journeying as he had intended to Rome, and enclosing a little piece of Fr. Campion's rib as a relic. On the 9th of the following August, Dolman left the College to proceed to Rome, but it is questionable if he persevered in his intention, for his name does not appear either in the College diary or pilgrim-book. It is more probable that he again changed his mind, and went direct to Pont-à-Musson, where he resumed his studies, and after completing philosophy, vas admitted into the Society of Jesus, Feb. 4, 1584, at the age of 27. He afterwards studied moral theology for three years at the same place, and filled the office of Sub-minister. He was still at Pont-à-Musson, according to the catalogue, in 1590, but after this year all trace of him is lost, and he probably died about that period; indeed, the pedigree places his death in 1586, though this date is no doubt too early.
