= Gaspar Dias =

Portuguese painter

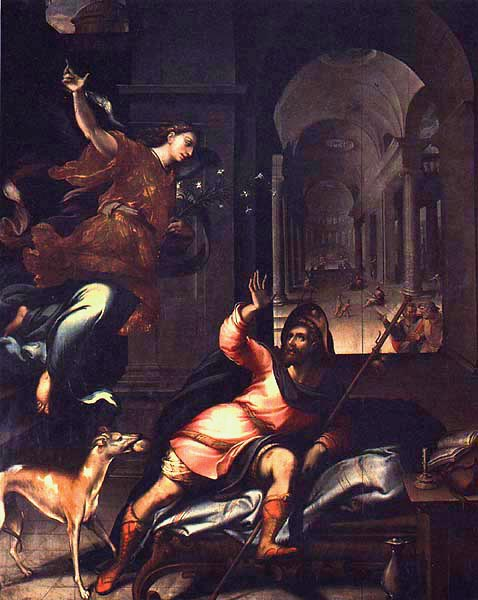
The Appearance of the Angel to St. Roch, ca. 1584, in the Igreja de São Roque in Lisbon

Gaspar Dias (died 1591), a Portuguese painter, studied at Rome under Raphael and Michelangelo, and on his return home devoted himself to the production of church pictures. He died at Lisbon.
