= Cuthbert Mayne =

English Roman Catholic priest, martyr and saint

Saint Cuthbert Mayne
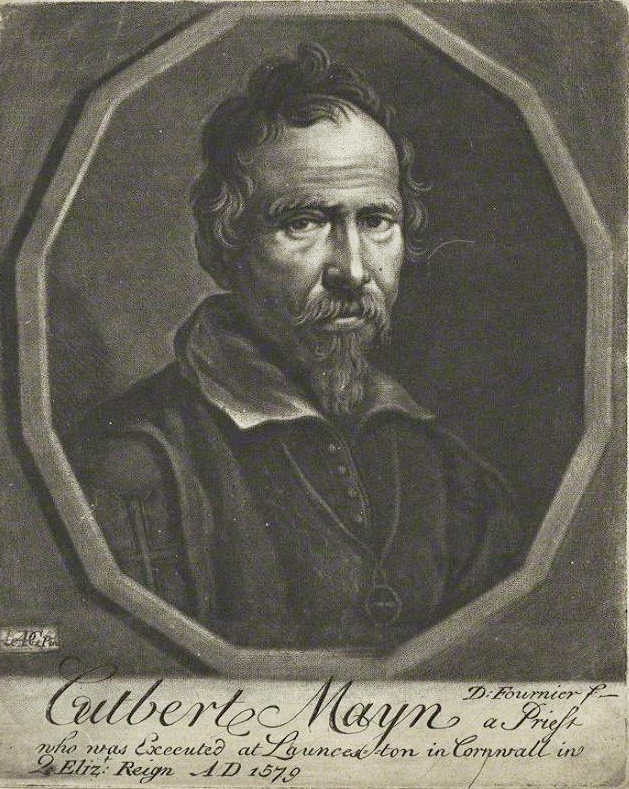
- Cuthbert Mayne in a mezzotint by Daniel Fournier

Priest and Martyr Forty Martyrs of England and Wales
- Born: Baptized 20 March 1543 or 1544; Youlston, near Barnstaple, Devon, England
- Died: 29 November 1577 (aged 33 or 34); Launceston, Cornwall, England
- Venerated in: Roman Catholic Church
- Beatified: 29 December 1886 by Pope Leo XIII
- Canonized: 25 October 1970 by Pope Paul VI
- Major shrine: Church of St Cuthbert Mayne, Launceston, Cornwall
- Feast: 30 November (individual); 25 October (together with Forty Martyrs of England and Wales); 29 November (one of the Douai Martyrs)
- Attributes: Noose around neck, crucifix, knife in chest, martyr's palm, holding a Bible
- Patronage: Launceston, Cornwall

Cuthbert Mayne (c. 1543–29 November 1577) was an English Catholic priest executed under the laws of Elizabeth I. He was the first of the seminary priests trained on the Continent to be martyred. Mayne was beatified in 1886 and canonised as one of the Forty Martyrs of England and Wales in 1970.

== Early life ==
Mayne was born at Youlston, near Barnstaple, Devon, the son of William Mayne. He was baptised at the Church of St Peter, Shirwell on 20 March 1543/4, the feast day of St Cuthbert. An uncle who was a Church of England priest paid for him to attend Barnstaple Grammar School.

Mayne was instituted rector of the parish of Huntshaw in December 1561. He attended Oxford University, first at St Alban Hall, then at St John's College, and was awarded a B.A. on 6 April 1566 and M.A. on 8 April 1570. On 27 April 1570, the papal bull Regnans in Excelsis excommunicated Queen Elizabeth I and those who obeyed her laws and commands, releasing her subjects from their allegiance to her.

== Catholic conversion ==
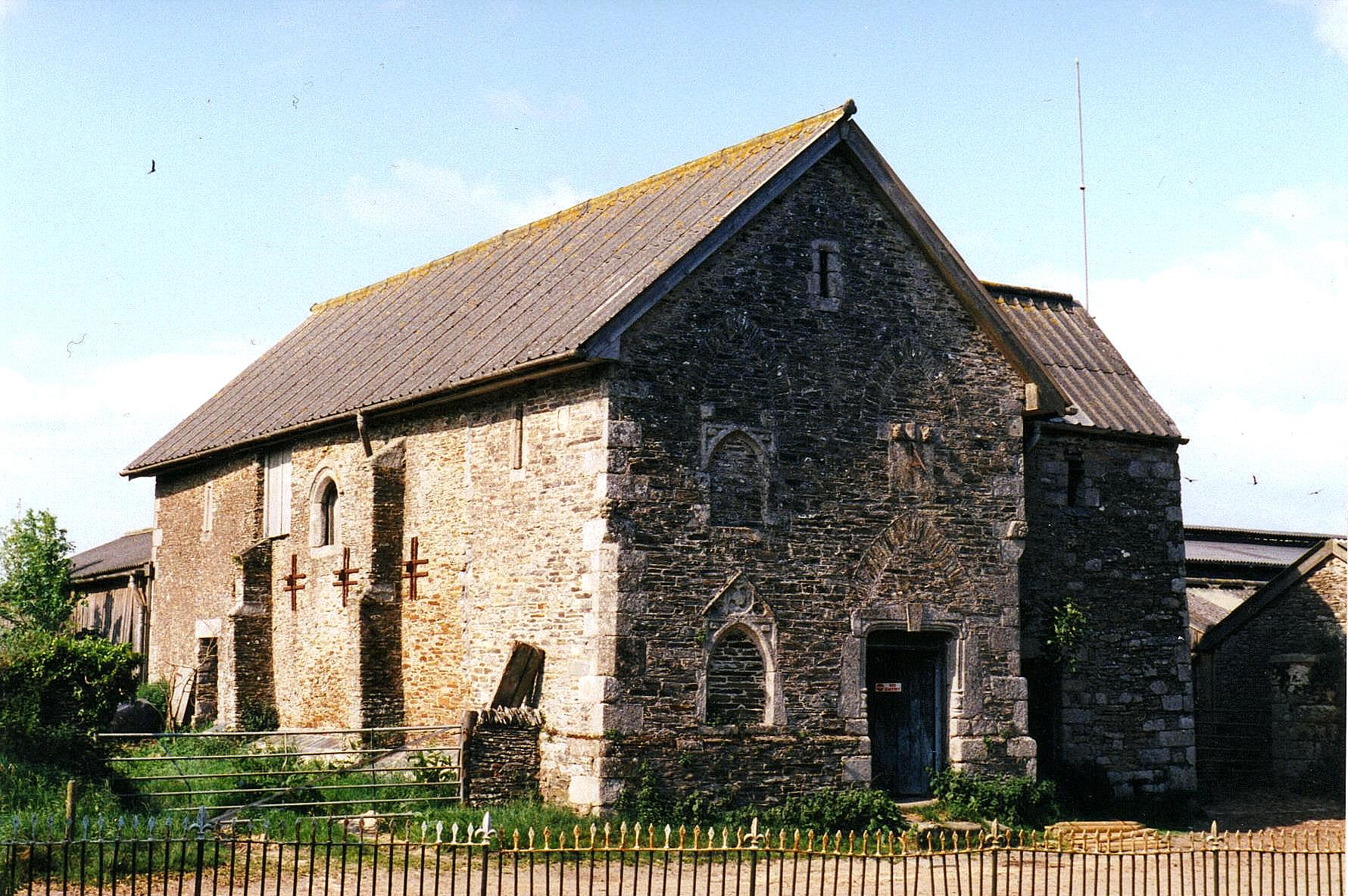
The barn at Golden Manor, a former secret chapel

At Oxford, Mayne met Edmund Campion and other Catholics, such as Gregory Martin, Humphrey Ely, Henry Shaw, Thomas Bramston, Henry Holland, Jonas Meredith, and Roland Russell. At some point, Mayne, too, became a Catholic. Late in 1570, a letter addressed to him from Gregory Martin, urging him to come to Douai, fell into the hands of the Bishop of London, and he sent a pursuivant to arrest Mayne and others mentioned in the letter. Warned by Thomas Ford, Mayne evaded arrest by going to Cornwall and then, in 1573, to the English College, Douai, now in northern France.

Mayne was ordained a priest in the Roman Catholic Church at Douai in 1575 and on 7 February in the following year he obtained the degree of Bachelor of Theology of Douai University.

On 24 April 1576, he left for the English mission in the company of another priest, John Payne. He soon joined the household of Francis Tregian at Golden in the parish of Probus, Cornwall where he posed as his steward. Francis Tregian (1548–1608) was one of the richest landowners in Cornwall.

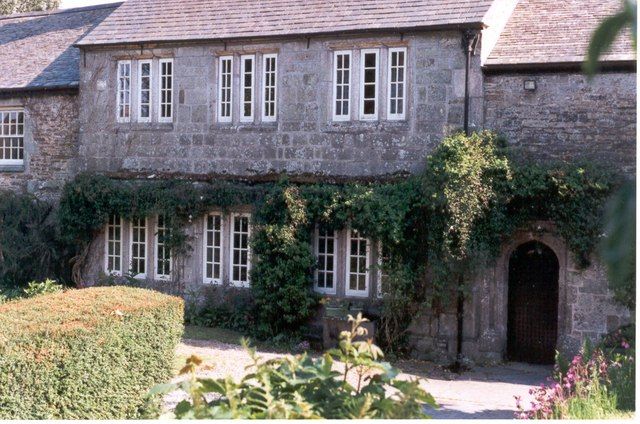
Golden Manor, Probus, scene of Mayne's arrest

Missionaries from Douai were looked upon as papal agents intent on overthrowing the queen. The authorities began a systematic search in June 1576, when the Bishop of Exeter William Bradbridge came to Cornwall. On 8 June 1577, the High Sheriff of Cornwall, Richard Grenville, conducted a raid on Tregian's house during which the crown officers "bounced and beat at the door" to Mayne's chamber. On gaining entry, Grenville discovered a Catholic devotional item, an Agnus Dei, around Mayne's neck, and took him into custody along with his books and papers.

== Imprisonment and trial ==
While awaiting trial at the circuit assizes in September, Mayne was imprisoned in Launceston Castle. At the opening of the trial on 23 September 1577 there were five counts against him: first, that he had obtained from the Roman See a "faculty" (or bulla), containing absolution of the Queen's subjects; second, that he had published the same at Golden; third, that he had taught the ecclesiastical authority of the pope and denied the queen's ecclesiastical supremacy while in prison; fourth, that he had brought into the kingdom an Agnus Dei (a Lamb of God sealed upon a piece of wax from the Paschal candle blessed by the pope) and delivered it to Francis Tregian; fifth, that he had celebrated Mass.

Mayne answered all counts. On the first and second counts, he said that the supposed "faculty" was merely a copy printed at Douai of an announcement of the Jubilee of 1575, and that its application having expired with the end of the jubilee, he certainly had not published it either at Golden (the manor house of Francis Tregian) or elsewhere. On the third count, he said that he had asserted nothing definite on the subject to the three illiterate witnesses who swore to the contrary. On the fourth count, he said that the fact he was wearing an Agnus Dei at the time of his arrest did not establish that he had brought it into the kingdom or delivered it to Tregian. On the fifth count, he said that the presence of a Missal, a chalice, and vestments in his room did not establish that he had said Mass.

The trial judge, Justice Sir Roger Manwood, directed the jury to return a verdict of guilty, stating that, "where plain proofs were wanting, strong presumptions ought to take place". Manwood also argued that it was illegal to introduce any papal letter into the country, no matter what it was. The jury found Mayne guilty of high treason on all counts, and accordingly, he was sentenced to be hanged, drawn and quartered. Mayne responded, "Deo gratias".

With him had been arraigned Francis Tregian and eight other laymen. The eight were sentenced to seizure of their goods and life imprisonment. Tregian was sentenced to die but was in fact incarcerated for 28 years until, on the petition of his friends, he was released by King James I.

His execution was delayed because one of the judges, Jeffries, took exception to the proceedings and sent a report to the Privy Council. The Council submitted the case to the whole bench of judges, which was inclined to Jeffries's view. Nevertheless, the council ordered the execution to proceed.

At the examination of Mayne after the trial, Mayne admitted to having said mass. The Record Office also recorded that among his papers were notes which brought him under suspicion of the charge that Catholics were bound, in the right opportunity, to rise against the Queen. The same office also recorded him admitting to this during his examination after the trial:

The words found in a book of his signifying that though the catholic religion did now serve, swear and obey, yet if occasion were offered they would be ready to help the execution, &c., were annexed to a text taken out of a general council of Lateran for the authority of the pope in his excommunication, and at the last council of Trent there was a consent of the catholic princes for a reformation of such realms and persons as had gone from the authority of the bishop of Rome when it was concluded that if any catholic prince took in hand to invade any realm to reform the same to the authority of the see of Rome, that then the catholics in that realm should be ready to assist and help them. And this was the meaning of the execution as he saith, which he never revealed to any man before.

Mayne had also supposedly stated that "the people of England may be won unto the catholic religion of the see of Rome by such secret instructions as either are or may be within the realm; but what these secret instructions are he will not utter, but hopeth when time serveth they shall do therein as pleaseth God".

== Execution ==
A gallows was erected in the marketplace at Launceston, and Mayne was executed there on 29 November 1577. Before being brought to the place of execution, Mayne was offered his life in return for a renunciation of his religion and an acknowledgement of the supremacy of the queen as head of the church. Declining both offers, he kissed a copy of the Bible, declaring that, "the queen neither ever was, nor is, nor ever shall be, the head of the church of England". He was not allowed to speak to the crowd but only to say his prayers quietly. It is unclear if he died on the gallows but all agree that he was unconscious, or almost so, when he was drawn and quartered. One source states that he was cut down alive, but in falling struck his head against the scaffold.

== Political considerations ==
A. L. Rowse sees the condemnation of Mayne as arising from local rivalries between Protestant coastal and Catholic inland interests. Grenville had been unsuccessful in his attempts to arrange a marriage between his daughter and the Tregian heir.

The coming of Mayne and others made the English government fear the possibility of papal agents coming to the island to ready the populace to rise up in revolt in support of King Philip II of Spain in an invasion of England. This helped support the case to pass harsher legislation against Catholicism in England. Establishing a threat from subversive Catholic elements also served Elizabeth's counsellors such as Lord Burghley in their attempts to persuade the Queen to support the Dutch Revolt against Spain.

== Legacy ==
Mayne was beatified "equipollently" by Pope Leo XIII, by means of a decree of 29 December 1886 and was canonised along with other martyrs of England and Wales by Pope Paul VI on 25 October 1970.

Mayne was the first seminary priest, the group of priests who were trained not in England but in houses of studies on the Continent. He was also one of the group of prominent Catholic martyrs of the persecution who were later designated as the Forty Martyrs of England and Wales.

Relics of Mayne's body survive. A portion of his skull is kept at Lanherne Convent in Cornwall. Christopher M. B. Allison suggests that the silver reliquary discovered in 2015 at Jamestown, Virginia in the grave of Captain Gabriel Archer (died 1609/10) may contain a relic of Mayne.

There are many memorials to him in Launceston, and in 1977 the name of the Roman Catholic church on St Stephen's Hill there was changed from the Church of the English Martyrs to the Church of St Cuthbert Mayne; it is the site of the National Shrine to St Cuthbert Mayne. In 1921 an annual June pilgrimage was initiated in Launceston to commemorate Mayne.

St Cuthbert Mayne School, a voluntary aided Roman Catholic and Church of England school in Torquay, and St Cuthbert Mayne Catholic Junior School in Hemel Hempstead, are named after him. The St Cuthbert Mayne RC High School in Fulwood, Lancashire merged in 1988 to become Our Lady's Catholic High School.

== In art ==
Daniel Fournier engraved a mezzotint of Mayne. Ushaw College has paintings of him.

Stained-glass windows represent him in the following churches/schools:

- The Chapel of St Cuthbert in Ushaw College.
- Roman Catholic Church of Our Lady Star of the Sea in Falmouth, Cornwall
- St Saviour's Church in Lewisham
- Church of St Mary of the Angels in Bayswater, London
- St Edmund's College, Ware
- Our Lady of Lourdes, Harpenden, Hertfordshire

== In fiction ==
In the historical novel The Grove of Eagles by Winston Graham, which is set in Cornwall some years after Mayne's death, there are several references to him. One character, a Catholic member of the prominent Arundell family of Tolverne, says that his Protestant brother, who was one of the jurors at Mayne's trial, will burn in Hell for his share in Mayne's death. The brother, filled with guilt for his share in the execution, has not only converted to the Roman Catholic faith but is risking his life by sheltering other priests.

== Sources ==
- Anstruther, Godfrey. Seminary Priests, St Edmund's College, Ware, vol. 1, 1968, pp. 224–226.
- Bishop Challoner, Memoirs of Missionary Priests and other Catholics of both sexes that have suffered death in England on religious accounts from the year 1577 to 1684 (Manchester 1803) pp. 7ff.
