= Daniel Fournier (engraver) =

English engraver and draughtsman

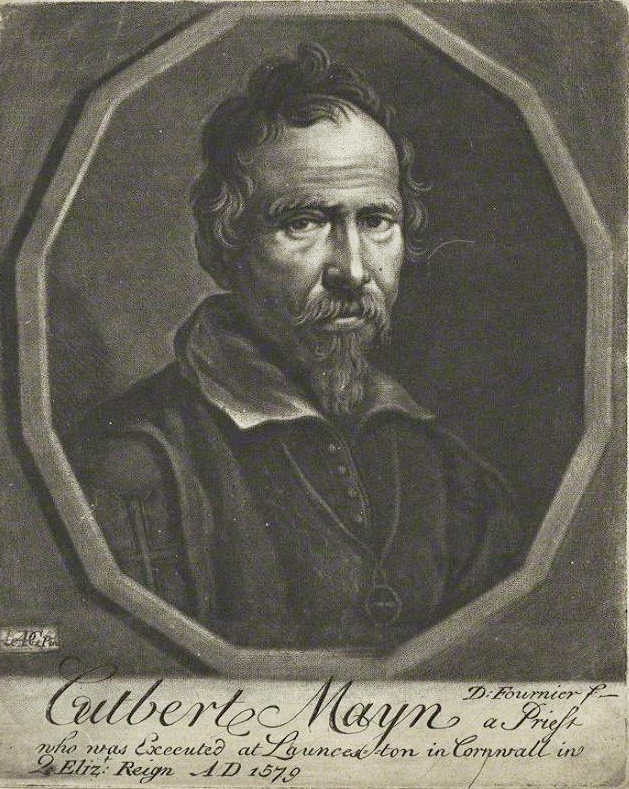
Cuthbert Mayne in a mezzotint by Fournier

Daniel Fournier (died 1766?) was an English engraver and draughtsman.

== Life ==
Fournier was originally educated as a metal chaser. He also practised the professions of ‘à-la-mode beef-seller, shoemaker, and engraver,’ according to the inscription on a small portrait of him etched by himself. He also dealt in butter and eggs, he modelled in wax, and he taught drawing.

He died in Wild Court, Wild Street, about 1766.

== Works ==
In 1761, at about the age of fifty, he wrote and published A Treatise of the Theory and Practice of Perspective, wherein the Principles of that most Useful Art are Laid Down by Dr. Brook Taylor, are fully and clearly Explained by Means of Moveable Schemes properly Adapted for the Purpose, &c. This was a simplified version of the theory of perspective earlier published by Brook Taylor. Fournier etched a survey of the Leeward Islands. He also engraved in mezzotint a portrait of Cuthbert Mayne, a priest executed for heresy in 1579.
