= Henry Foley (historian) =

English Jesuit Roman Catholic church historian

Henry Foley, S.J.
- Born: 9 August 1811; Astley,Worcester, England
- Died: 19 November 1891 (aged 80); Manresa House, Roehampton, England
- Occupations: Jesuit lay brother, church historian
- Known for: The Records of the English Province of the Society of Jesus; Jesuits in Conflict

Henry Foley, S.J. (9 August 1811 – 19 November 1891) was an English Jesuit Roman Catholic church historian.

== Biography ==
He was born at Astley in Worcestershire, England on 9 August 1811. His father was the Protestant curate in charge at Astley. After his early education at home and at a private school at Woodchester, Henry was articled to a firm of solicitors in Worcester, and in the course of time practised as a solicitor, at first in partnership with another, then by himself.

Under the influence of the Oxford Movement, he converted to Catholicism in 1846. Five years later, on the death of his wife Anne, daughter of John Vezard of Gloucestershire, he sought admission as a lay brother into the Society of Jesus. Urged to enter as a scholastic and to prepare for the priesthood, he said it was Our Lady's wish that he should be a lay brother. For thirty years he occupied the post of lay brother socius to the English provincial superior.

During that time he produced his immense and detailed compilation of historical details, The Records of the English Province of the Society of Jesus (eight octavo volumes). He also wrote Jesuits in Conflict, a work describing the sufferings of some of the English Jesuit Confessors of the Faith.

Foley's bodily austerities were remarkable, while his spirit of prayer led him at all free moments to the chapel.

He died at Manresa House, Roehampton, on 19 November 1891.

== Works ==
- Jesuits in Conflict. London: Burns and Oates (1873)
- Records of the English Province of the Society of Jesus, Vol. I. London: Burns and Oates (1877)
- Records of the English Province of the Society of Jesus, Vol. II. London: Manresa Press (1875)
- Records of the English Province of the Society of Jesus, Vol. III. London: Burns and Oates (1878)
