= Richard Simpson (writer) =

British Roman Catholic writer and literary scholar (1820–1876)

Richard Simpson (16 September 1820–5 April 1876) was a British Roman Catholic writer and literary scholar. He was born at Beddington, Surrey, into an Anglican family, and was educated at Merchant Taylors' School and at Oriel College, Oxford. He obtained a BA degree on 9 February 1843. He was ordained in the Church of England, and became the vicar of Mitcham in Surrey, in 1844, the same year that he married his cousin, Elizabeth Mary Cranmer. He resigned his position some time before being received into the Catholic Church on 1 August 1846. He then spent more than a year on the continent, becoming very proficient as a linguist.

Simpson returned to England in 1847, and settled in Clapham, Surrey. In 1850, he began to write for The Rambler, a Catholic periodical founded by converts. In 1856, he became its assistant editor, and in 1858, was made editor. When the magazine was discontinued in 1862 Simpson, with Sir John Acton, began the Home and Foreign Review. This met with resistance from the Catholic hierarchy, and was discontinued in 1864.

Afterwards Simpson devoted himself to the study of William Shakespeare, to music, and to writing. He was one of the first to advance the theory that Shakespeare had been a Catholic. Also, he was elected a member of the committee of the New Shakspere Society in 1874. He is probably best remembered for his biography of the English Jesuit martyr, Edmund Campion; this book was praised seven decades later by Evelyn Waugh in his own Campion book. Simpson's Edmund Campion was revised, edited and enlarged by Fr Peter Joseph in 2010. Simpson died of cancer in Rome on 5 April 1876.

== Works ==
- Invocation of Saints proved from the Bible alone (1849)
- The Lady Falkland: Her Life (1861)
- Edmund Campion (1867)
- Introduction to the Philosophy of Shakespeare's Sonnets (1868)
- The School of Shakespeare (1872)
- Sonnets of Shakespeare selected from a complete setting, and miscellaneous songs (1878)
