= Church of the Immaculate Conception, Farm Street =

Coordinates: 51.5095°N 0.1491°W

Farm Street Church
- Church of the Immaculate Conception, Farm Street
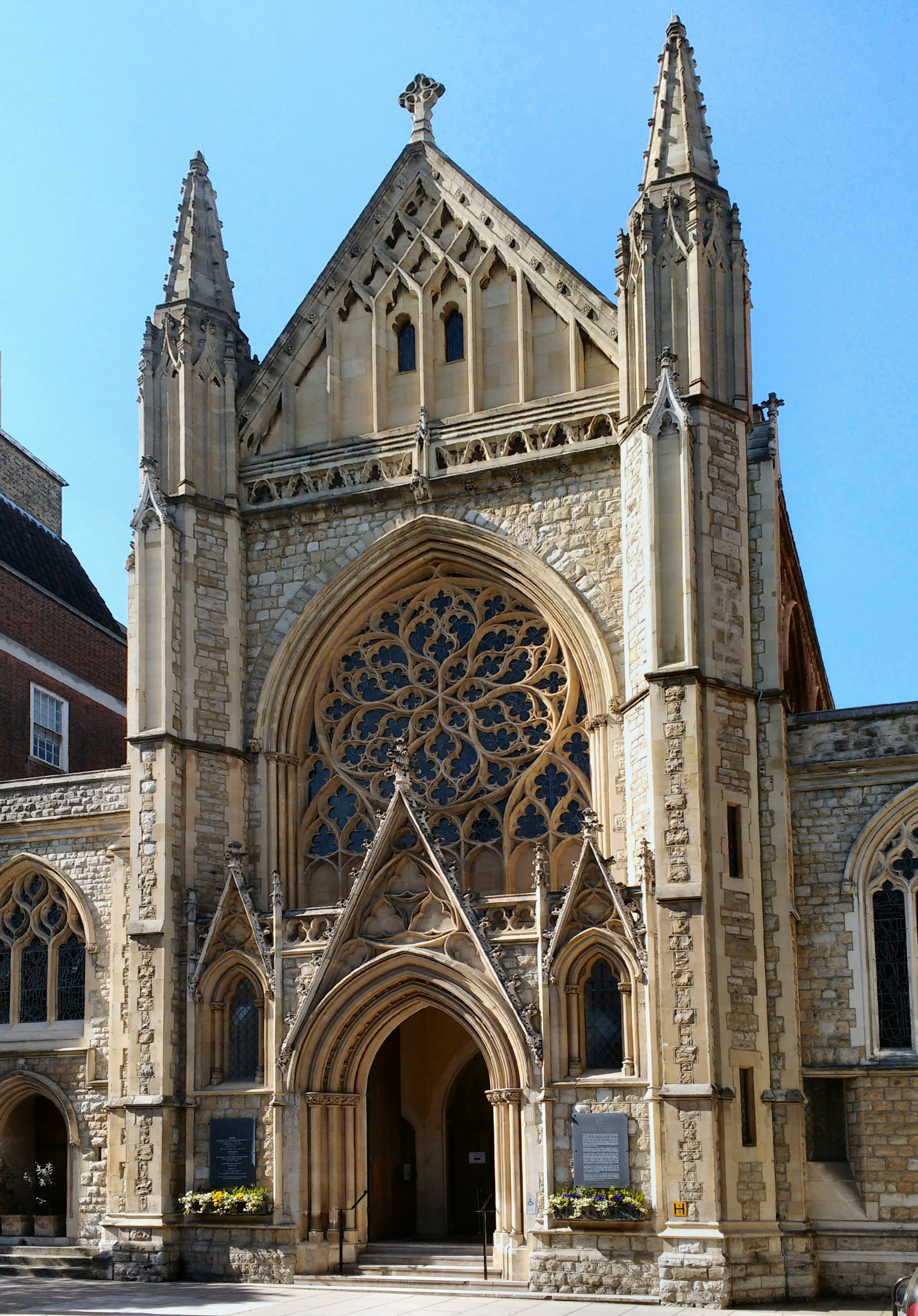
- Entrance to the church on Farm Street

- Location of church within Westminster, London
- OS grid reference: TQ 28545 80577
- Location: Mayfair, London
- Country: England
- Denomination: Roman Catholic
- Religious order: Society of Jesus
- Website: farmstreet.org.uk

History
- Status: Parish church
- Founded: 1849
- Founder: Randal Lythgoe SJ
- Dedication: Immaculate Conception of Mary
- Consecrated: 31 July 1849

Architecture
- Functional status: Active
- Heritage designation: Grade II*
- Designated: 24 February 1958
- Architect: Joseph John Scoles
- Style: Gothic Revival
- Groundbreaking: 1844
- Completed: 1849

Administration
- Province: Westminster
- Archdiocese: Westminster
- Deanery: Marylebone

Clergy
- Archbishop: Vincent Nichols
- Priest: Dominic Robinson SJ

The Church of the Immaculate Conception, Farm Street, also known as Farm Street Church, is a Catholic parish church run by the Society of Jesus in Mayfair, Central London, England.

Its main entrance is in Farm Street, though it can also be accessed from the adjacent Mount Street Gardens. Sir Simon Jenkins, in his book England's Thousand Best Churches, describes the church as "Gothic Revival at its most sumptuous".

== History ==
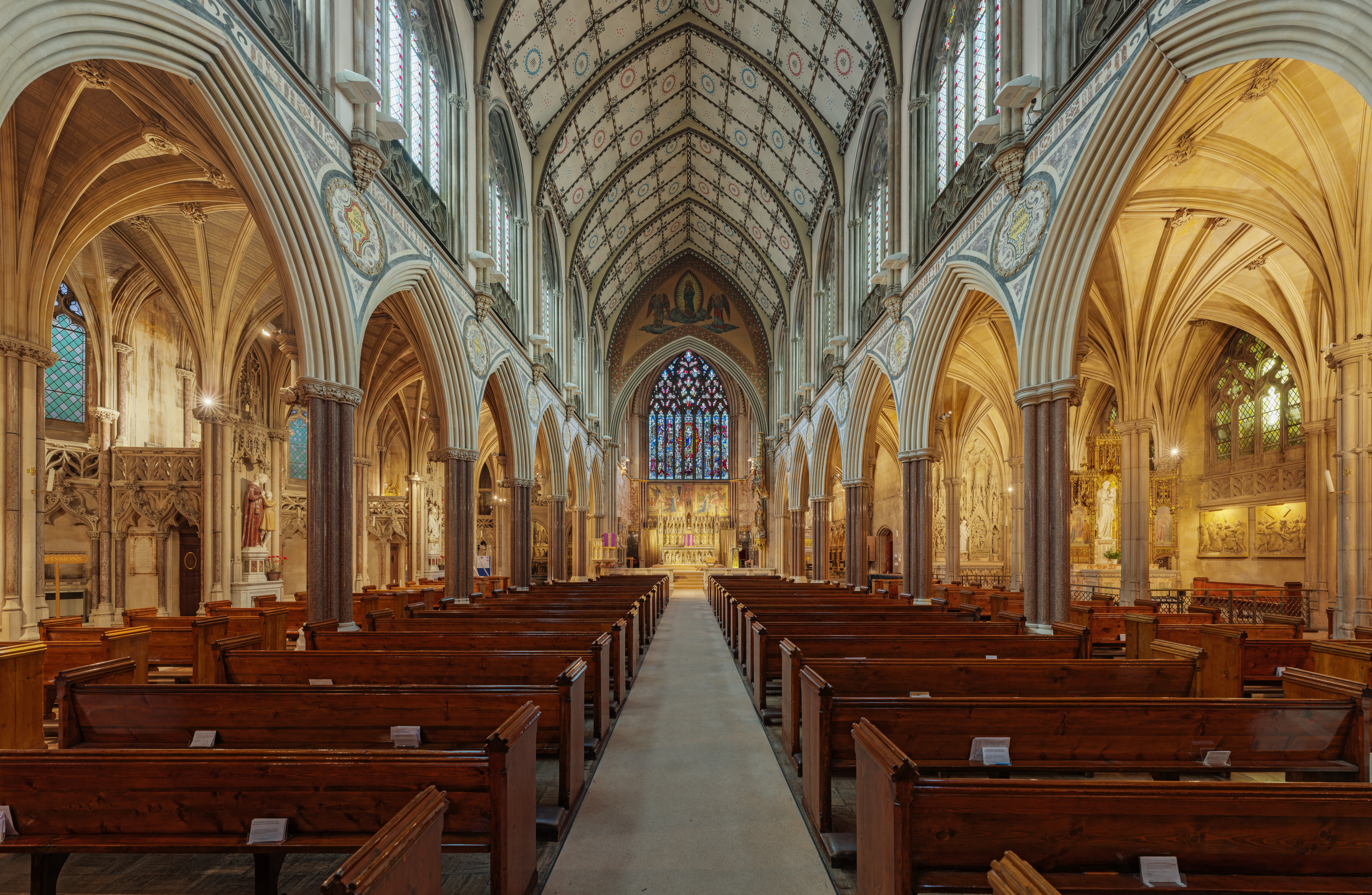
View facing the altar

=== Foundation ===
In the 1840s, when the Jesuits first began looking for a location for their London church, they found the site in the mews of a back street. The name 'Farm Street' derives from 'Hay Hill Farm' which, in the eighteenth century, extended from Hill Street eastward beyond Berkeley Square. In 1843, Pope Gregory XVI received a petition from English Catholics for permission to erect a Jesuit Church in London and plans were accepted.

=== Construction ===
The original intention of the Superior of the English Jesuits, Fr Randal Lythgoe, was for the church to have a capacity for 900 people. When this was found too expensive the church was built for a capacity of 475. The cost was £5,800 which came from multiple private benefactors.

In 1844 the foundation stone was laid by Fr Lythgoe. Because of the limited size of the plot, the church was orientated north-south. The architect was Joseph John Scoles, who also designed the Church of St Francis Xavier in Liverpool, St Ignatius Church in Preston, and was father of Ignatius Scoles SJ, another architect, who designed St Wilfrid's Church also in Preston. Five years later on 31 July 1849, the feast of the Jesuit founder St Ignatius, the church was officially opened.

The style is decorated gothic and the front of the church, towards Farm Street, is inspired by that of Beauvais Cathedral. The high altar was designed by Augustus Pugin, with an inscription requesting prayers for the altar’s benefactress, Monica Tempest. Above Pugin's high altar are two mosaic panels depicting the Annunciation and the Coronation of the Virgin by Salviati.

In 1912, the original stained glass window of the choir, which was the tarnished by pollution, was replaced a new one from the John Hardman Trading Company of Birmingham. The old window was cleaned, repaired and then sold to St Agnes Church in Lac-Mégantic, in Quebec, Canada.

The church was remodelled in 1951 by Adrian Gilbert Scott, following damage sustained by the building during the Second World War. In 1966, it became the parish church of Mayfair.

In his 1999 book England's Thousand Best Churches, Sir Simon Jenkins awards the church two stars but says "Not an inch of wall surface is without decoration, and this in the austere 1840s, not the colourful late-Victorian era. The right aisle carries large panels portraying the Stations of the Cross. The left aisle has side chapels and confessionals, ingeniously carved within the piers. In the west window above the gallery is excellent modern glass by Evie Hone of 1953, with the richness of colour of a Burne-Jones."

=== Developments ===
In March 2013 the church opened its doors to LGBT Catholics in response to the "Soho Masses" at the nearby Church of Our Lady of the Assumption and St Gregory coming to an end after six years. Archbishop Vincent Nichols attended their first mass there in 2013. Commentators noted that the church had previously declined to accommodate Oscar Wilde when, in 1897, on his release from prison after serving a two-year sentence for gross indecency, he had petitioned Farm Street to request a six-month retreat.

== Choir ==
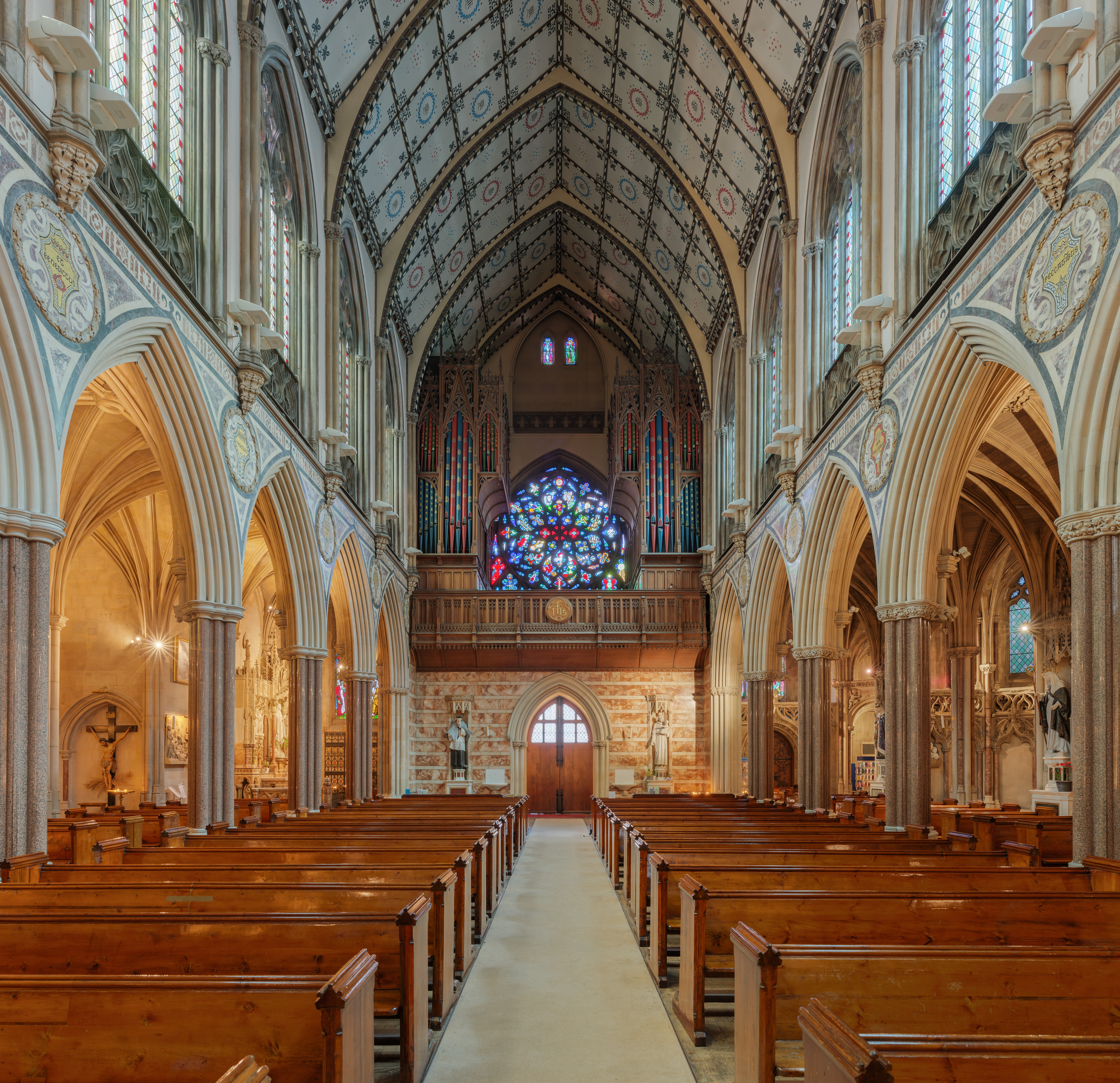
Entrance and church organ

In the nineteenth century, the choir consisted only of men and boys drawn from the local Roman Catholic schools.

Between 1881 and 1916, the organist was John Francis Brewer, son of the architectural illustrator Henry William Brewer, who was just 18 when appointed. Brewer was also a novelist and journalist, best known today for his 1888 thriller, 'The Curse Upon Mitre Square', inspired by the Whitechapel Murders.

After the First World War, the choir came under the direction of Fr John Driscoll SJ, who was later succeeded by Fernand Laloux, and the organist was Guy Weitz, a Belgian who had been a pupil of Charles-Marie Widor and Alexandre Guilmant. One of Weitz's most notable students was Nicholas Danby (1935–1997) who succeeded him as the church organist in 1967. Danby was also a tutor and taught John Keys, Paul Hale, and Robert Costin. His main achievement at Farm Street was re-establishing the choir in the early 1970s, following a period of change in the late 1960s, as a fully professional ensemble.

Following Nicholas Danby's death in 1997, two of his students, Martyn Parry and David Graham, were appointed Joint Directors of Music. Martyn Parry was formerly Director of Music at the Sacred Heart Church in Wimbledon. David Graham had studied music with Nicholas Danby at the Royal College of Music. In December 2004 and following the death of Martyn Parry earlier that year, the music was reorganised and Duncan Aspden was appointed Associate Director of Music, to assist David Graham in directing the professional choir and playing the organ.

During the 1990s a number of recordings were made of the music at the Farm Street church. In 2000 a CD of organ music, recorded by David Graham and including the music of Guy Weitz, was recorded on the church organ in Farm Street.

In the twenty-first century, the repertoire consists of sixteenth century polyphony, the Viennese classical composers, nineteenth century romantics, twentieth century and contemporary music as well as Gregorian chant.

== London Jesuit Centre ==
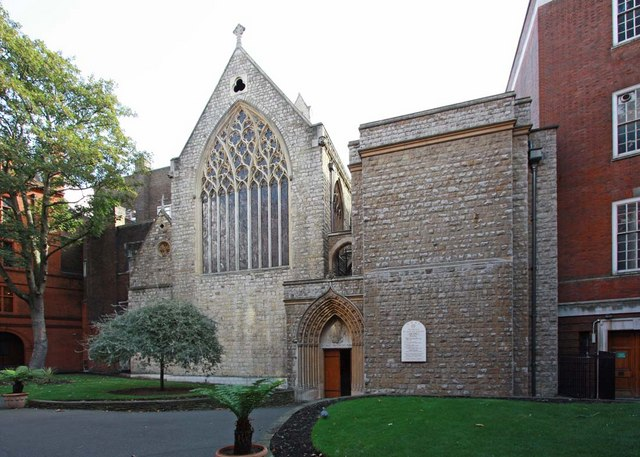
Mount Street Gardens view of the church. The London Jesuit Centre is on the left.

In September 2004, the Mount Street Jesuit Centre was launched. Its intention was to provide adult Christian formation through prayer, worship, theological education and social justice. To do this it gave non-residential retreats and courses in spirituality as well as providing a full-time General Practitioner for homeless people at the Doctor Hickey Surgery in central London, and working with the London Jesuit Volunteers programme.

In 2019, Heythrop College formally closed. The London Jesuit Centre was launched the same year in the same location as the Mount Street Jesuit Centre. It includes a reading room of the Heythrop Library, which provides access to about 8,000 books, plus indirect access (via off-site requests) to most of the collection of the Heythrop College, making it available again after its closure. The London Jesuit Centre provides teaching courses, spirituality, retreats and research. Until 2022, in conjunction with the University of Roehampton, a master's degree in theology, ecology and ethics, was taught in the Centre. The degree was also linked to the research done in the Laudato Si' Research Institute in Campion Hall, Oxford. The Centre continues the work of the Mount Street Jesuit Centre by offering spirituality courses as well as residential and non-residential retreats.

== Thinking Faith ==
Thinking Faith is an online journal that publishes theological articles as well as perspectives on politics, philosophy, spirituality, poetry and culture.

In 2001, The Month, a monthly review publication, was closed. It had run from 1864 and was founded by Frances Margaret Taylor. It was owned by the Jesuits and edited by its members. After its closure a new effort was made to publish articles on matters of faith. On 18 January 2008, Thinking Faith was launched. It was founded with the aim to publish its articles online, and more frequently than the monthly schedule of its predecessor. It regularly posts articles on matters of faith that go through an editorial board. It covers topics such as biblical analysis, spirituality, political and social issues as well as the current trends and recents works in the arts, poetry and culture, including regular book and film reviews. Its online format allows its articles to be distributed by other sites such as America, and Catholic Outlook, the journal of the Diocese of Parramatta. It is free to access and subscribe.

== Visit of King Charles III ==
In December 2024 King Charles III attended a special Advent service at the Church of the Immaculate Conception in Mayfair, central London, co-hosted by Aid to the Church in Need (ACN), a Catholic Charity that supports persecuted Christians.

== Interior ==
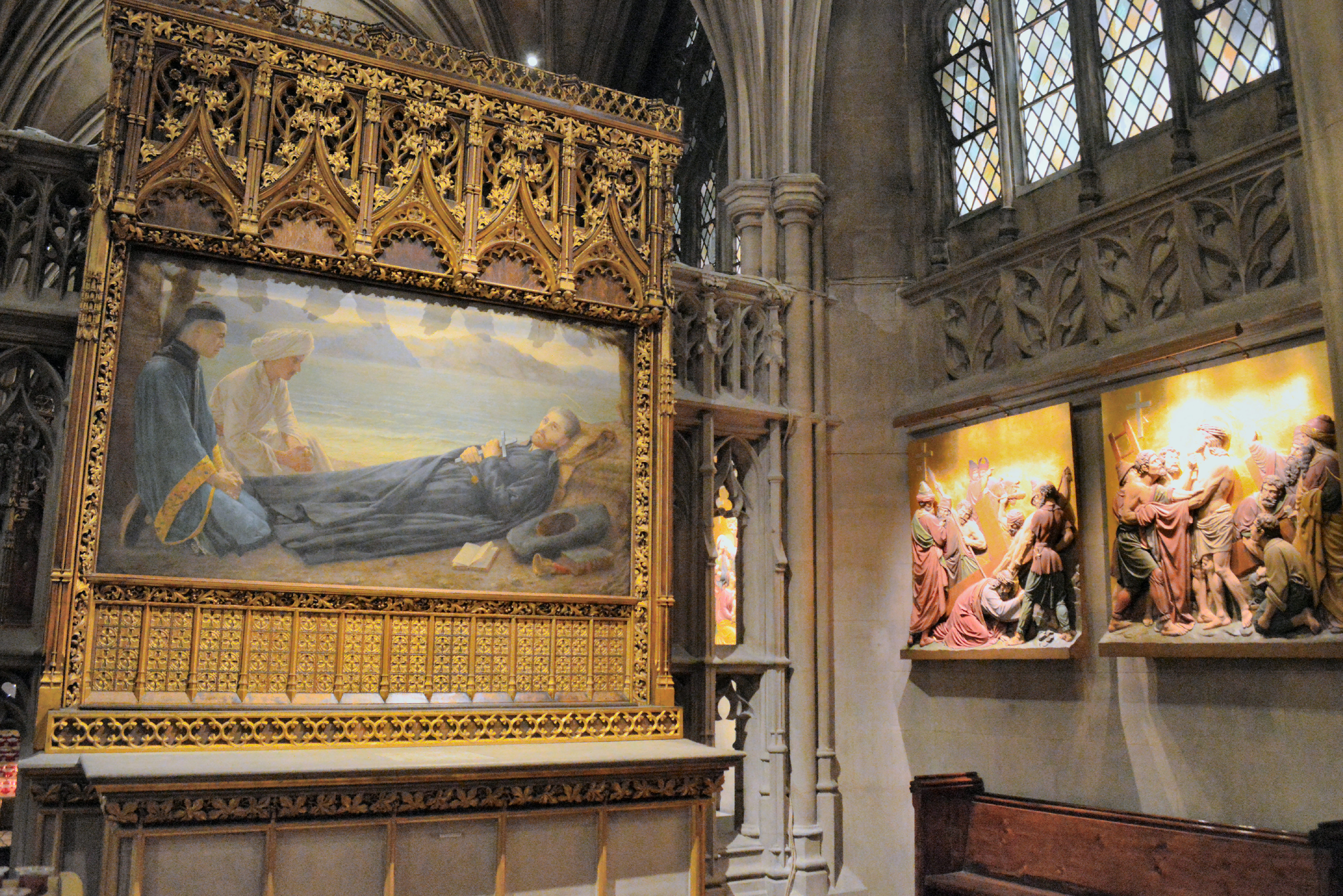
St. Francis Xavier Chapel

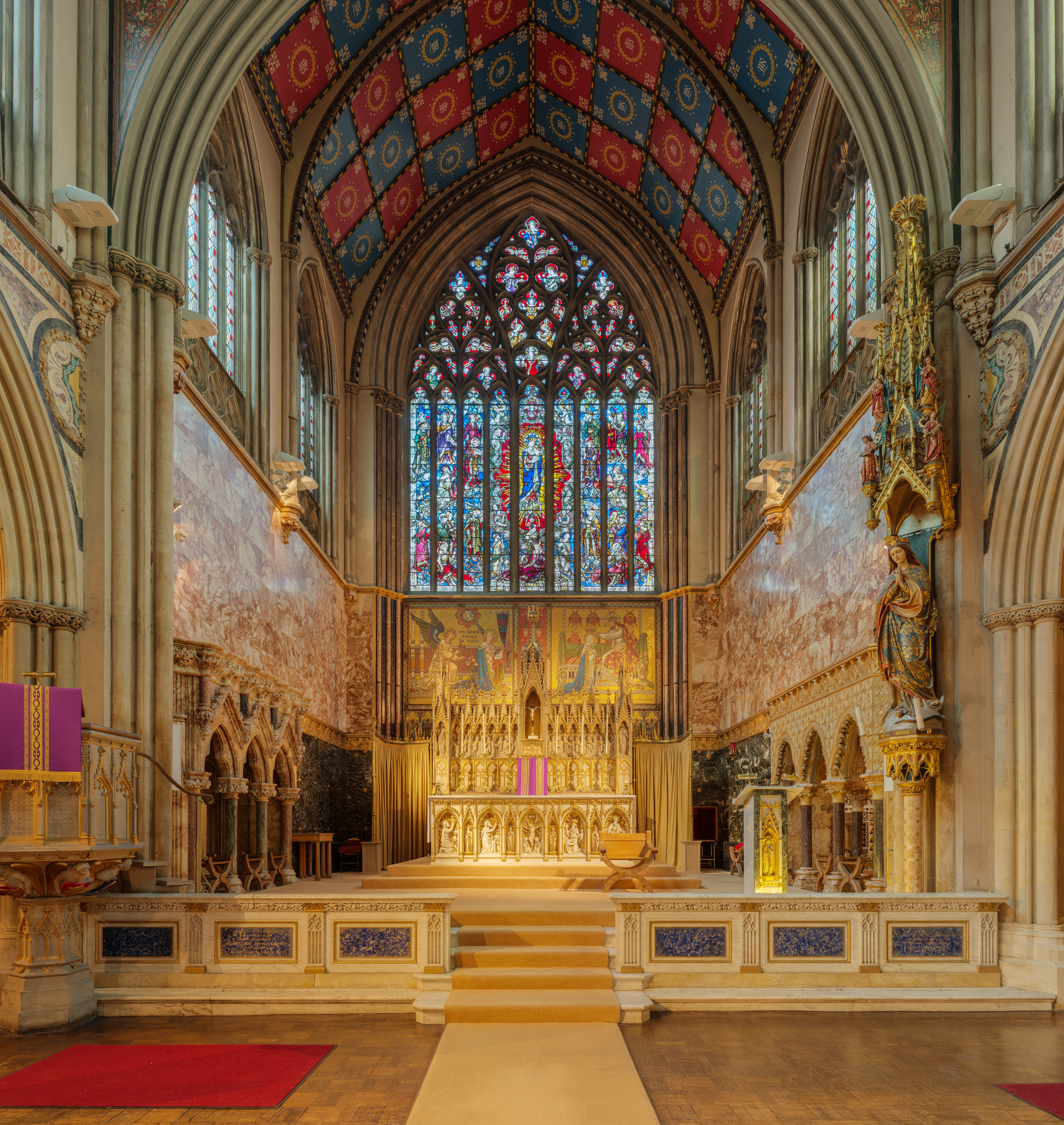
High Altar at the north end

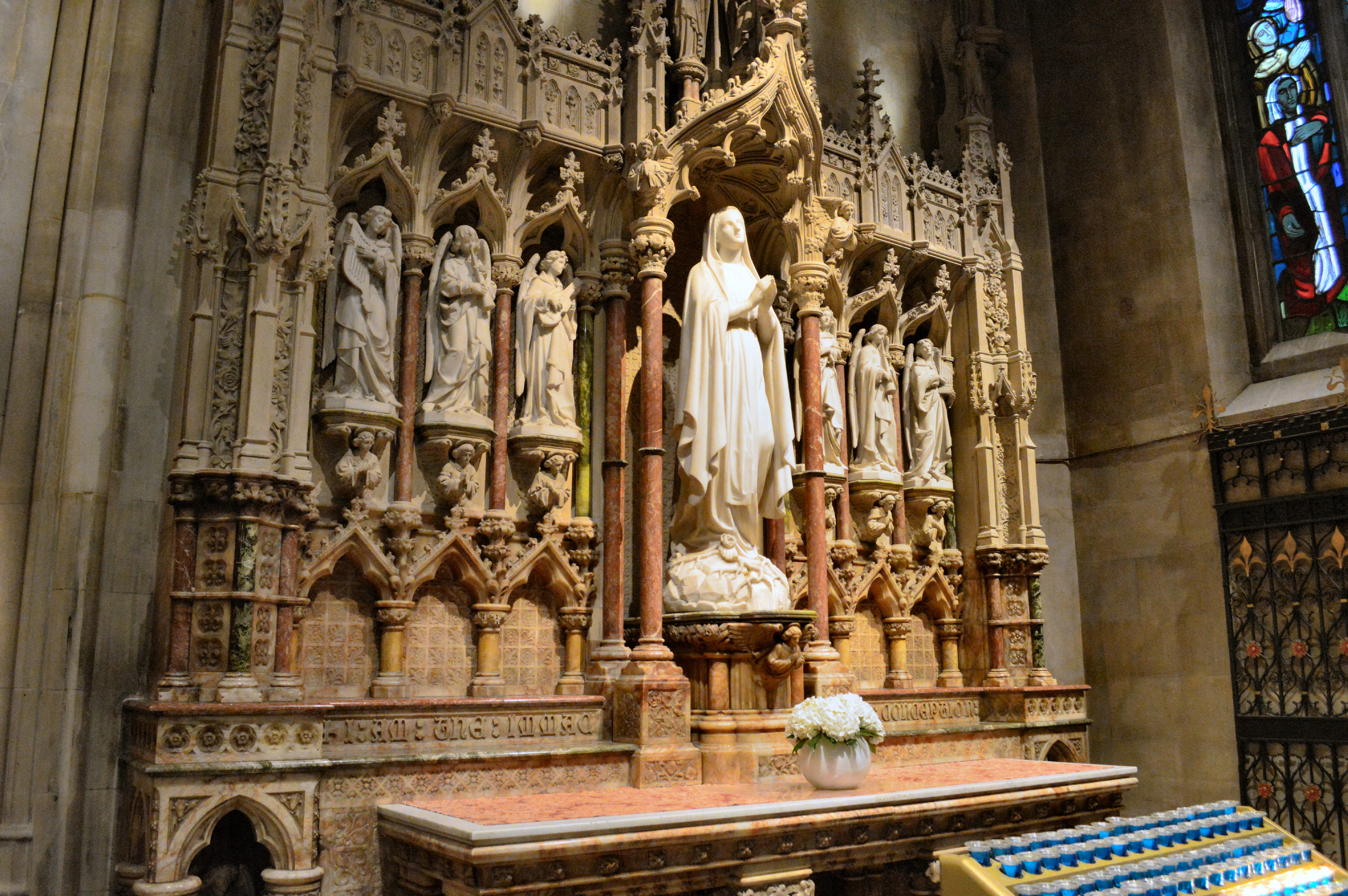
Chapel of Our Lady of Lourdes

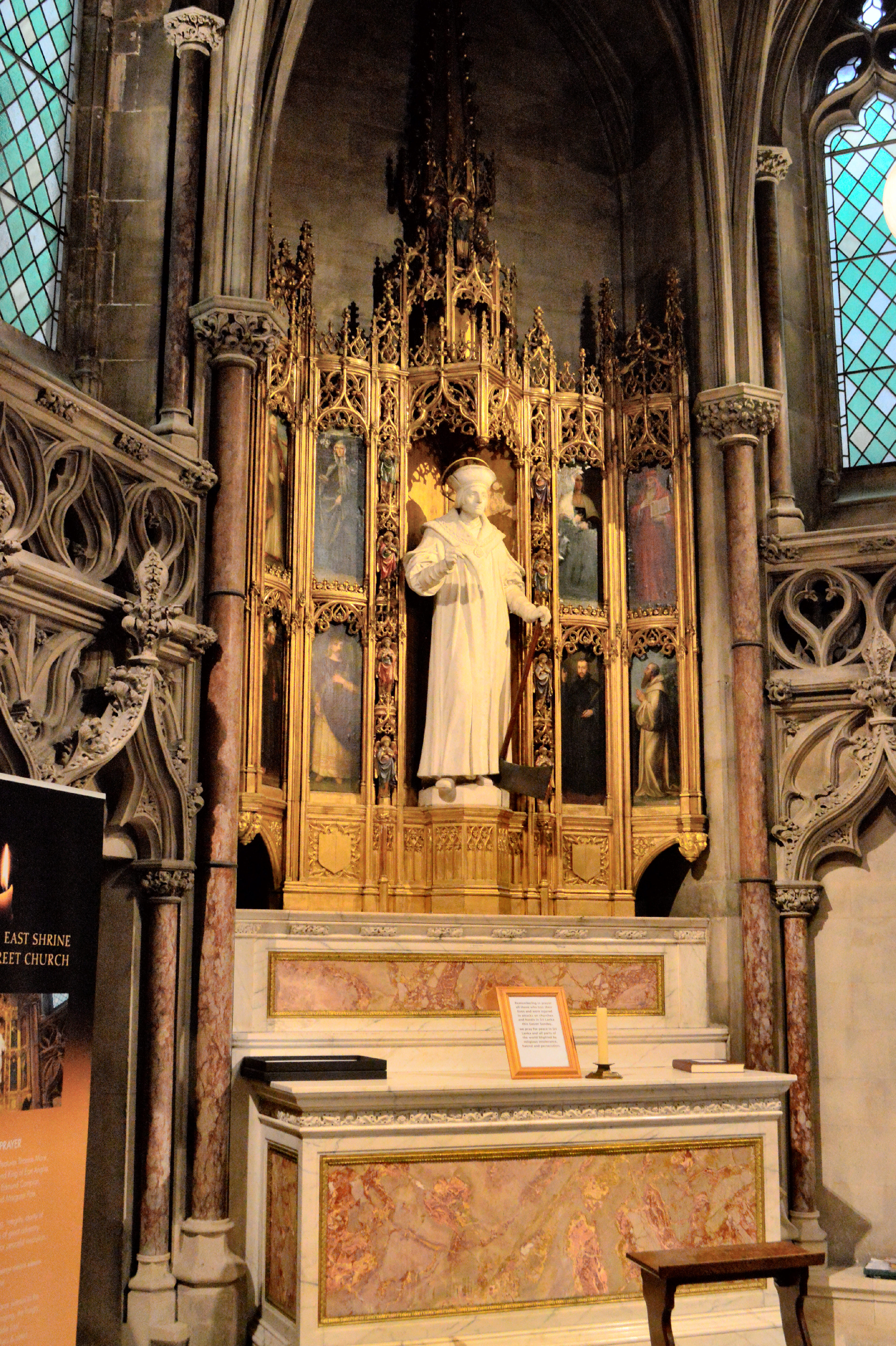
The English Martyrs Chapel

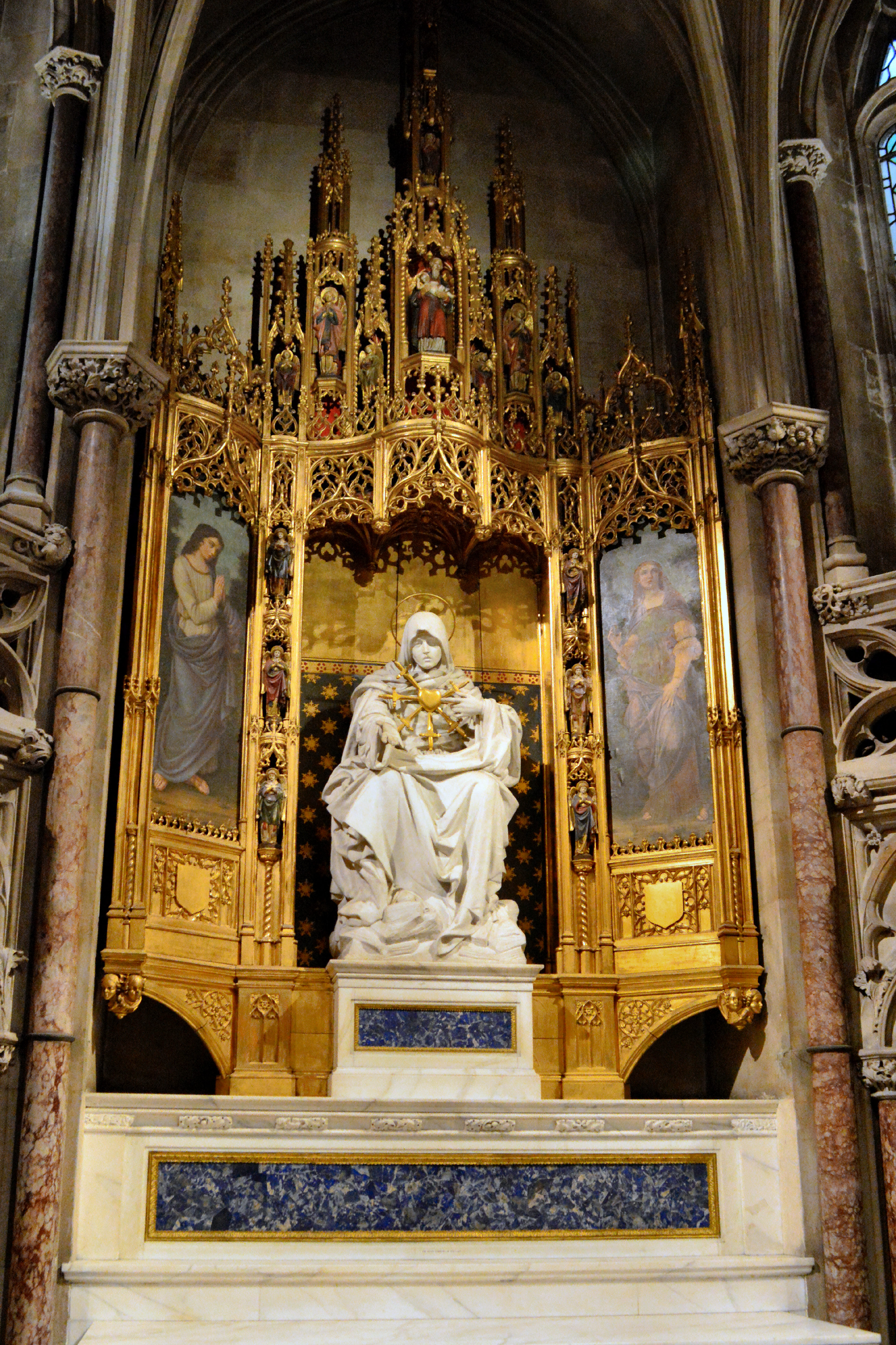
Our Lady of Dolours

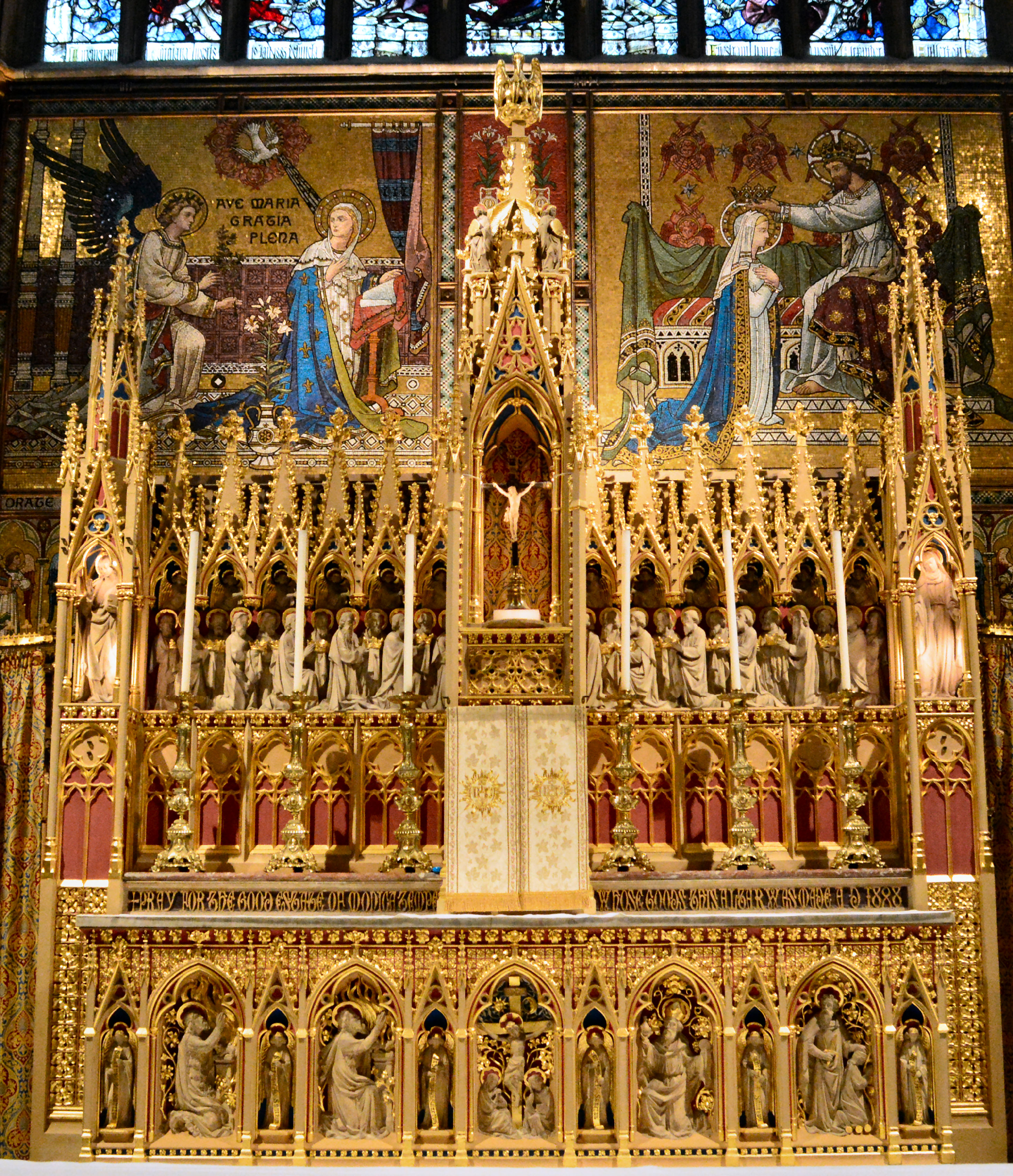
Pugin's high altar

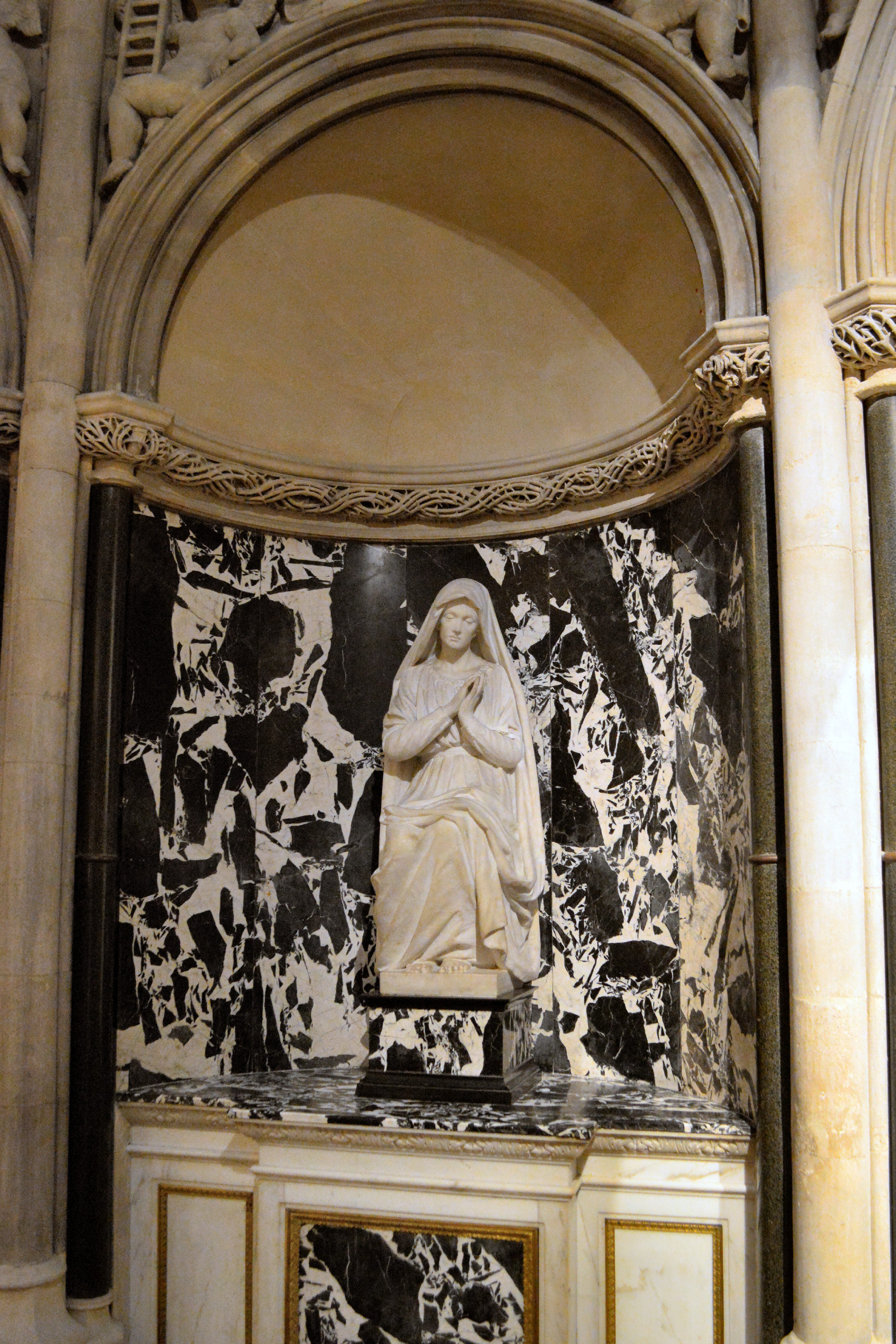
A white carrara statue of the Mother of Sorrows (by Swynnerton) in the Calvary Chapel.

== See also ==
- Ignatian spirituality
- List of Jesuit sites in the United Kingdom
- List of Catholic churches in the United Kingdom
