= Nicholas Danby =

British organist, recitalist and teacher

- Born: 19 July 1935
- Died: 15 June 1997 (aged 61)
- Occupations: Organist; Recitalist; Teacher
- Organizations: Sacred Heart Church, Wimbledon; Royal College of Music; Royal Academy of Music

Nicholas Danby (19 July 1935 – 15 June 1997) was a British organist, recitalist and teacher. He was a great-great-grandson of Charles Dickens and nephew of Monica Dickens. Danby was an Organ Professor at both the Royal College of Music and the Royal Academy of Music in London, where he was head of Organ Studies from 1989 to 1996. For over thirty years he was Director of Music at the London Jesuit Church of the Immaculate Conception, Farm Street, Mayfair.

Danby attended Beaumont College, Old Windsor. He was apprenticed to the Belgian Guy Weitz, who was organist of the Jesuit Church of the Immaculate Conception, Farm Street, in Mayfair, London. Danby succeeded him in this position, where he re-founded a professional choir and remained until his death. From 1963 to 1965 he was also Director of Music at Sacred Heart Church, Wimbledon.

Danby taught the organ at the Royal College of Music and the Royal Academy of Music and was head of the organ department of the latter from 1989 to 1996. Among his students were Robert Costin, Paul Hale, Patrick Russill, Roger Sayer, Paul Trepte, Andrew Wilson-Dickson and Julian Perkins. He was also an internationally renowned organ recitalist and was a jury member at international competitions.

He recorded organ works by Dieterich Buxtehude on the Baroque organ at St Laurents in Alkmaar. His "Bach Organ Works" recording (SMK 64239) for Sony Classical Records was very well received by Gramophone: "Danby's registrations are clearly designed to give a comprehensive picture of the instrument's tonal resources […]. His performances are thoroughly rewarding; sensitive but never overindulgent in the smaller pieces, strong, enormously self-assured in the larger works." He recorded the complete organ works by Johannes Brahms. A reviewer noted that he was "an organist who put musicality above effect and for whom the organ was a servant of the music rather than of its own aural effects".

After Danby's death, a foundation was set up, The Nicholas Danby Trust, selecting a laureate annually in order to grant them a scholarship for European conservatoire study.
