= Manchester School of Art =

Former art school in Manchester, England

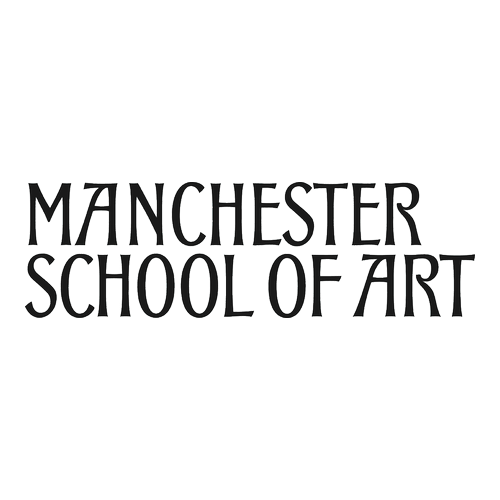
- Motto: Many Arts, Many Skills
- Type: Public
- Location: 153 Oxford Road, Manchester, M15 6BR, England; 53.4697°N 2.2382°W
- Website: www.artdes.mmu.ac.uk

Listed Building – Grade II
- Official name: Grosvenor Building, Manchester Metropolitan University Faculty of Art and Design
- Designated: 3 October 1974
- Reference no.: 1293192

Manchester School of Art on Oxford Road in Manchester, England, was established in 1838 as the Manchester School of Design. It is the second-oldest art school in the United Kingdom after the Royal College of Art which was founded the year before. It is now part of Manchester Metropolitan University.

== History ==
The school opened in the basement of the Manchester Royal Institution on Mosley Street in 1838. It became the School of Art in 1853 and moved to Cavendish Street in 1880. It was subsequently named the Municipal School of Art. In 1880 the school admitted female students, at the time the only higher education available to women, although men and women were segregated. The school was extended in 1897.

The school became part of Manchester Polytechnic in 1970 and is now part of the Faculty of Arts and Humanities at the Manchester Metropolitan University. Its 175th anniversary in 2013 was marked by the opening of the new Benzie Building and the refurbishment of the Chatham Tower. The school comprises five departments, the Manchester School of Architecture (MSA), formed in 1996 and jointly administered with the University of Manchester, the Department of Art & Performance which incorporates the Manchester School of Theatre, the Department of Design, Manchester Fashion Institute and the School of Digital Arts (SODA).

The school became responsible for the non-degree courses of the Manchester Municipal College of Technology by 1996, when the rest of that institution became the University of Manchester Institute of Science and Technology. This transfer gave a historical link to the Manchester Mechanics' Institute established in 1824.

== Architecture ==
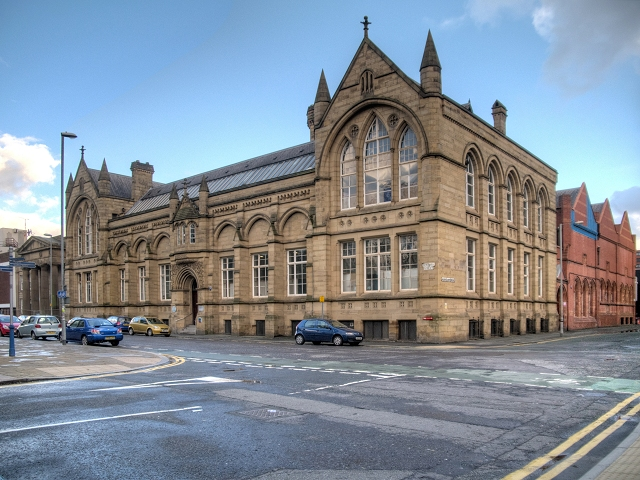
Manchester School of Art

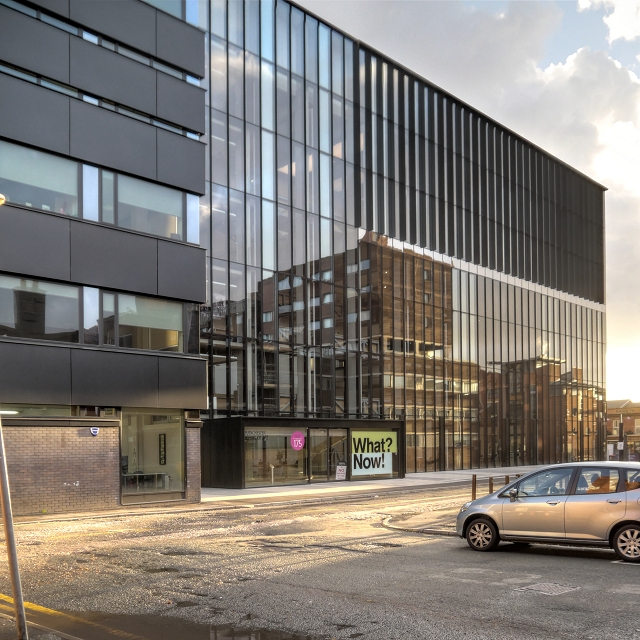
The Lowry Building

The Manchester Municipal School of Art was built in Cavendish Street in 1880–81 to the designs of G. T. Redmayne. On a rectangular plan it was constructed in sandstone ashlar with buff terracotta dressings. It is two storeys high above a basement and has slate roofs with glazed skylights. Its symmetrical facade, built in the Neo-Gothic style, has large gabled wings with pinnacles at either side of its buttressed and blind arcaded main range. In the centre is a chamfered doorway with a moulded arched head and carved spandrels above which is a canted oriel window with a steep roof against a gable with pinnacles and a finial at the top. The building is Grade II listed.

The 1897 extension designed by Joseph Gibbon Sankey, at the rear of the building, was built in red brick and terracotta with Modern Style (British Art Nouveau style) decoration by W.J. Neatby, chief designer at Royal Doulton.

In 2014 the 1960s Chatham Tower (named after the adjacent street) was refurbished and the Benzie Building was built, to provide additional studio and exhibition space for the art school. The design, by Feilden Clegg Bradley Studios, was shortlisted for the Stirling Prize in the same year. It was renamed the Lowry Building in 2024.

== People ==
Calico printers Edmund Potter and James Thomson were involved in the school's foundation. The first head from 1838 was John Zephaniah Bell, who pursued a fine art curriculum until 1843. John Cassidy studied in 1883 and taught there for a year in 1887. Walter Crane was the Director of Design from 1893 to 1898. Adolphe Valette was a teacher there from 1906 to 1920. On 1 December 2020, Professor Martyn Evans was appointed as Director of Manchester School of Art.

Its graduates include L.S. Lowry, Eugene Halliday, Liam Spencer, Ossie Clark, Martin Parr, Malcolm Garrett, Peter Saville, Thomas Heatherwick, T. Mewburn Crook, Roger Hampson and Audrey Albert. Sylvia Pankhurst was a student at the school. Susan Dacre and Annie Swynnerton formed the Society of Women Painters and Swynnerton became the first woman to be elected to the Royal Academy since its inception in 1768.

John Mayall enrolled at the School of Art in the 1950s. British bluegrass music pioneers Tom Travis and Tom (Smiley) Bowker enrolled at the School of Art in the 1950s. Other notable musicians to attend the school include Mick Hucknall, who studied Fine Art in the 1980s and formed Simply Red.

== Collections ==
When founded, the school promoted the Arts and Crafts movement's philosophy and its collection includes metalwork, jewellery, wallpapers, a tapestry made by Morris & Co. designed by Edward Burne-Jones, Whitefriars glass by James Powell and Sons and George Henry Walton, silverware by Charles Robert Ashbee and ceramics from Pilkington's Art Pottery.
