= Joseph Swynnerton =

Joseph William Swynnerton (1848–1910) was a Manx-born monumental sculptor. His wife, who worked with him in Rome was the artist Annie Swynnerton (née Robinson).

== Gallery ==
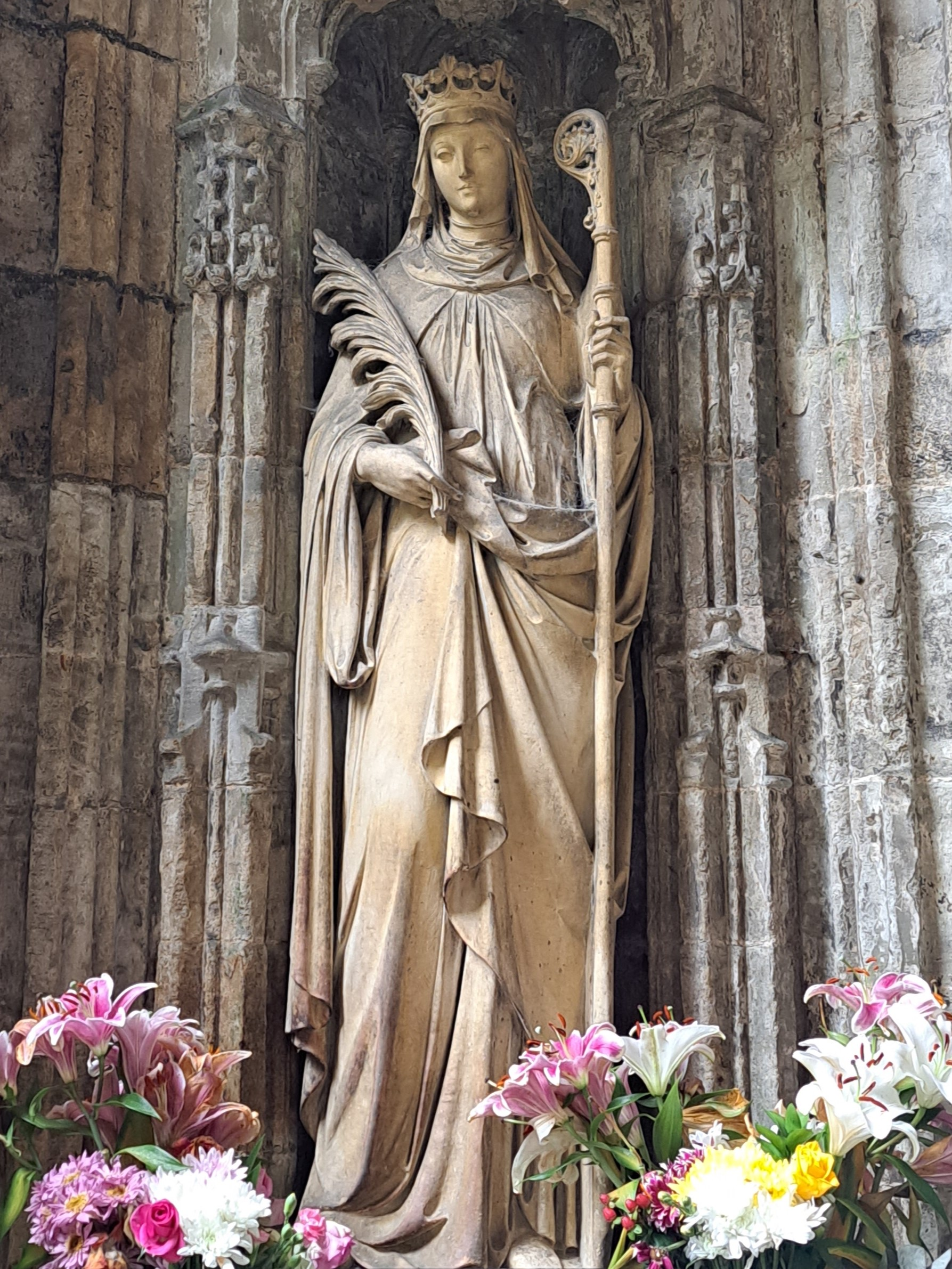
Swynnerton's St Winefride at St Winefride's Well in Flintshire

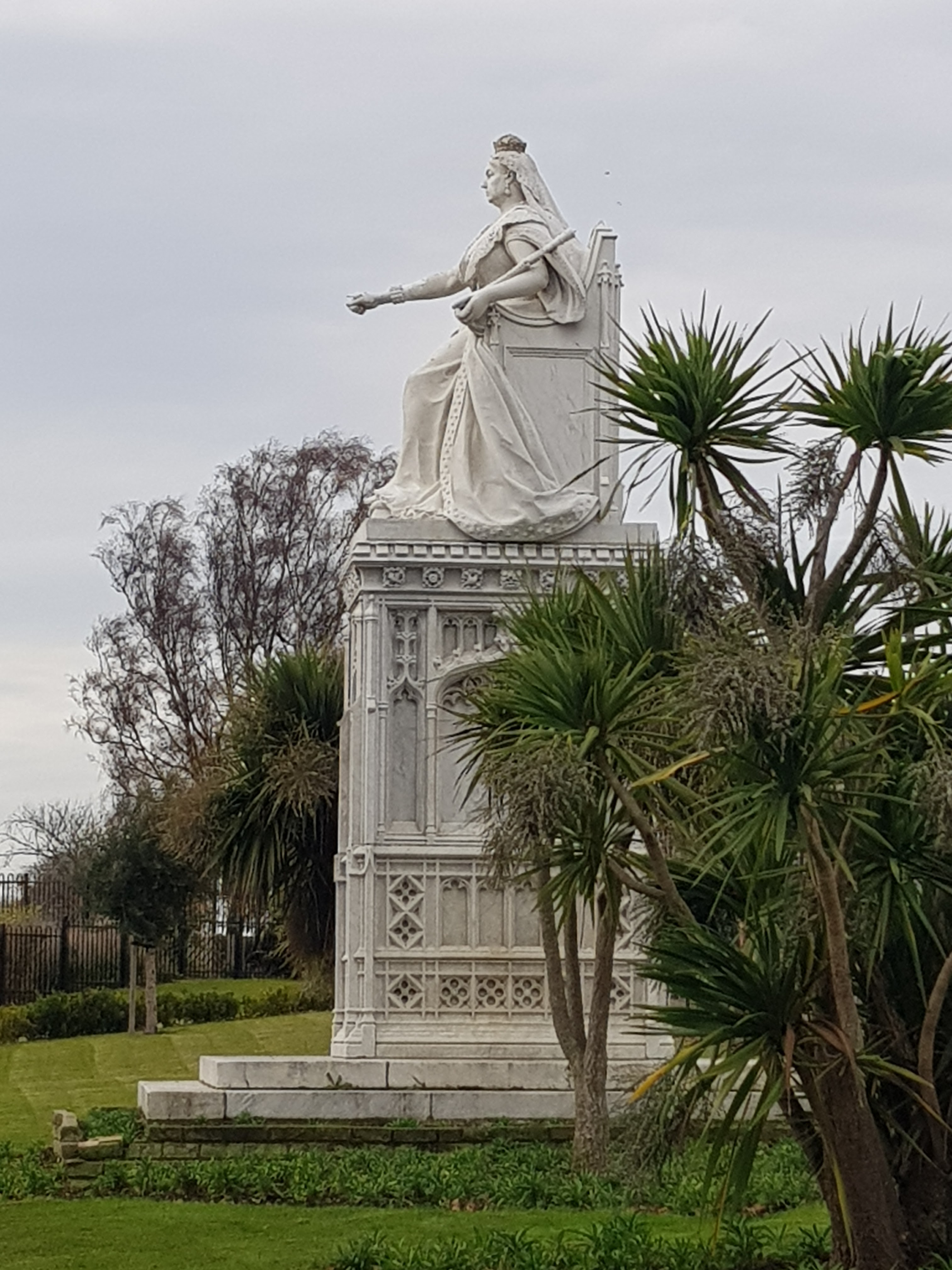
Swynnerton's Queen Victoria statue, Southend

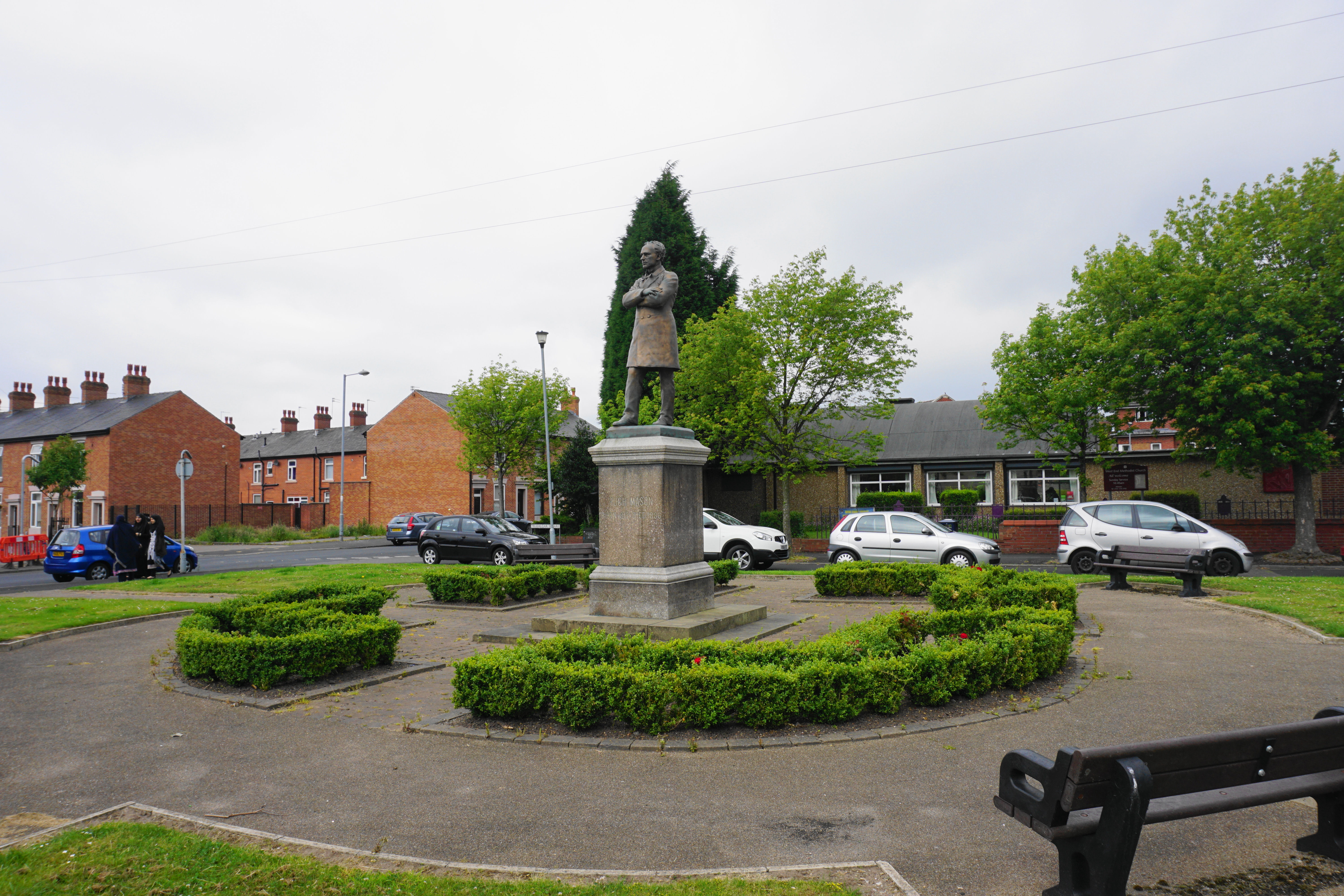
Swynnerton's Hugh Mason statue in Trafalgar Square, Ashton-under-Lyne

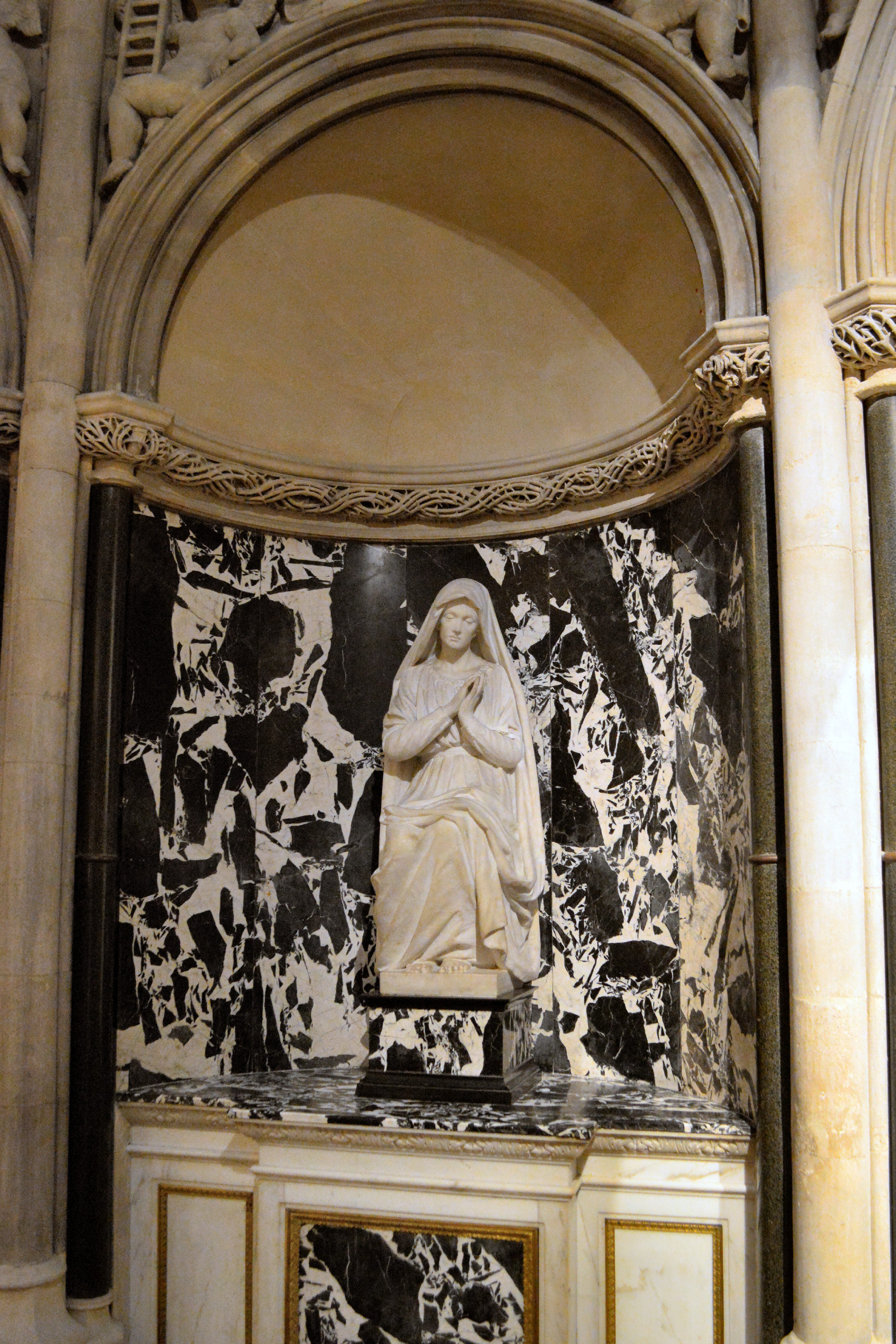
Swynnerton's white carrara statue of the Mother of Sorrows in the Calvary Chapel of the Church of the Immaculate Conception, Farm Street

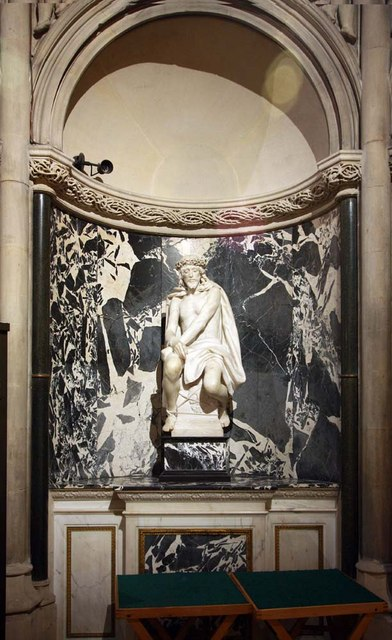
Swynnerton's white carrara statue of the Man of Sorrows (after Dürer). in the Calvary Chapel of the Church of the Immaculate Conception, Farm Street
