= Patrick Russill =

English choral conductor (born 1953)

Patrick Russill (born 9 September 1953) is an English choral conductor, organist and pedagogue.

Patrick Russill is Director of Music of the London Oratory (since 1999) and Emeritus Head of Choral Conducting at the Royal Academy of Music, London (since 2024). He was Visiting Professor of Choral Conducting at the Hochschule für Musik und Theater Leipzig (2001-2023) and is Chairman of the Church Music Society (since 2019). He was appointed a Professor of the University of London in 2022, and was made Emeritus Professor in 2024.

== Career ==
Educated at Shaftesbury Grammar School, Dorset (1965–1972), he was organ scholar (1972–1975) at New College, Oxford, where he gained a first class honours degree in music. He studied organ with Nicholas Danby and at the age of 23 was appointed organist of the London Oratory in 1977 in succession to Ralph Downes. Between 1984 and 2003 he was also Director of the London Oratory Junior Choir. During this time the choir appeared at The Proms, at the Royal Opera House and participated in recordings of J.S. Bach's St Matthew Passion and Monteverdi's Vespers of 1610 on the DG Archiv label with Sir John Eliot Gardiner and the Monteverdi Choir.

Russill was appointed Head of Church Music at the Royal Academy of Music in 1987, founding Britain's first conservatoire church music department. From 1997 to 2024 he was Head of Choral Conducting at RAM, leading the UK's first specialist postgraduate choral conducting course. He has given choral conducting masterclasses for the Royal College of Organists, the Cathedral Organists' Association, the Assistant Cathedral Organists' Association, the Conference of Catholic Directors of Music, and the Music Masters' and Mistresses' Association. He has also been a visiting professor at the conservatoires in Stockholm, Helsinki, Düsseldorf, Strasbourg and Vienna.

Appointed Director of Music at the London Oratory in 1999, with its professional Choir of the London Oratory Russill has recorded a number of CDs on the Herald label and broadcast on BBC Radio 3.

As an organ recitalist he has played at major venues in the UK including York Minster, Westminster Cathedral, St Alban's Abbey and Birmingham Town Hall, as well as throughout Europe and Asia. He made his Royal Festival Hall organ recital debut in 1986. In 2007 he introduced the reconstructed Tudor organs of the Early English Organ Project to London's South Bank, in an acclaimed Queen Elizabeth Hall recital. He was Chief Examiner of the Royal College of Organists 2005–2017.

He has also been an organ consultant, with the Revd Canon Dr Nicholas Thistlethwaite, for the rebuilding of the Harrison & Harrison organ at Ely Cathedral (1999–2001).

As a scholar he has published articles on subjects mainly focussing on the English and Catholic traditions - early Tudor liturgical organ music, Howells' Latin Church music and Dupré's Vespers - as well as editing choral music by Sweelinck and Howells for Novello and the Church Music Society (published by Oxford University Press). He was Musical Editor of the Catholic Hymn Book (1998) and has contributed to the revised New Grove, The Cambridge Companion to the Organ (1998), and Geschichte der Kirchenmusik (Laaber-Verlag, 2011 and 2013).

In 2015, Russill was honoured by the Association of British Choral Directors with their annual Chairman's Award for Choral Leadership and in 2017 was made a Fellow 'honoris causa' of the Royal School of Church Music. In 2023 he was awarded the Medal of the Royal College of Organists (its highest honour) in recognition of his distinguished achievement in choral conducting and pedagogy, and in church music. In 2024 he was appointed a Papal Knight of the Order of Saint Gregory the Great.
