= Susan Isabel Dacre =

English artist (1844–1933)

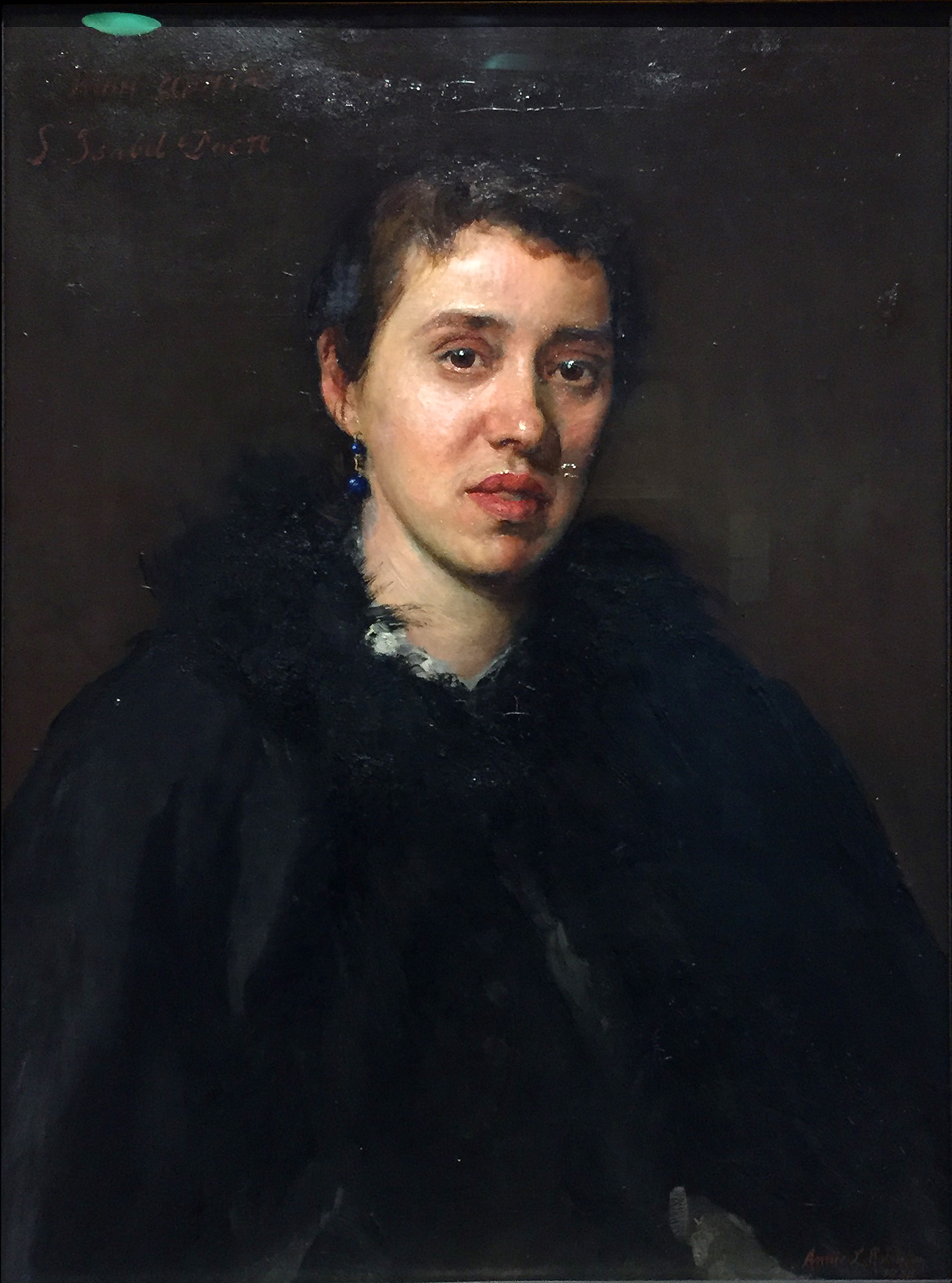
- Portrait of Susan Isabel Dacre by Annie Swynnerton (1880). Manchester Art Gallery
- Born: 1844; Leamington, Warwickshire
- Died: 1933 (aged 88–89)
- Education: Manchester School of Art, Académie Julian

Susan Isabel Dacre (1844–1933), known as Isabel Dacre, was an English artist of the Victorian era.

== Biography ==
She was born in Leamington, Warwickshire, and was educated at a convent school in Salford. For the decade of 1858–68 she lived in Paris, first attending school and later working as a governess. After a winter in Italy (1869), she returned to Paris, and was present during the Franco-Prussian War and the Paris Commune. She returned to England in 1871 and began studying art at the Manchester School of Art, where she won the Queen's Prize in 1875. She began a lifelong friendship with fellow artist Annie Swynnerton; the two women pursued their art studies in Rome and Paris between 1874 and 1880.

Around 1872, Lord Leighton dictated notes and observations on his methods of painting and composing his pictures to Isabel Dacre, during a stay on the island of Capri.

== Portraits and the Académie Julian ==
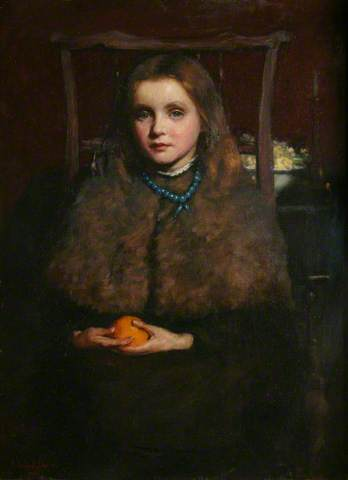
Little Annie Rooney, inspired by the popular music hall song. Manchester Art Gallery

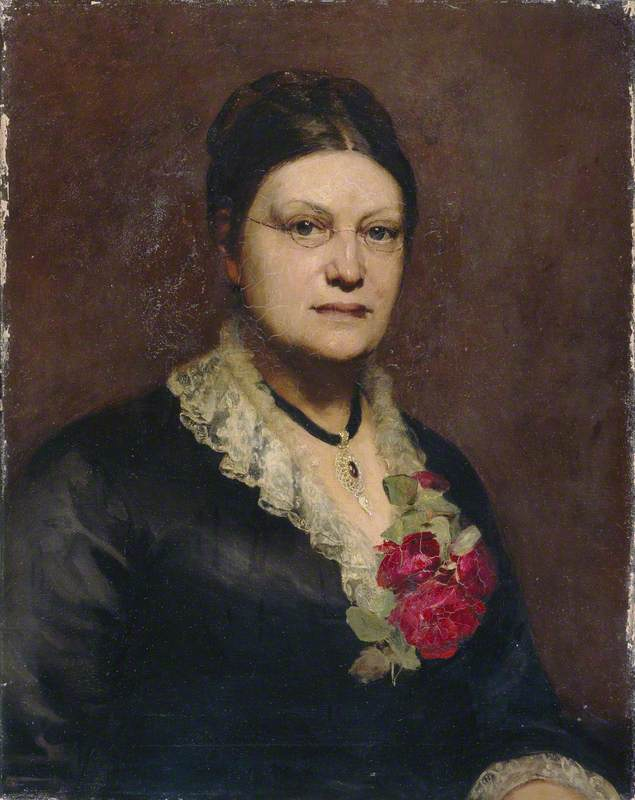
Portrait of Lydia Becker

From 1877–80 she was in Paris at the Académie Julian with a fellow - pupil Marie Bashkirtseff and bracketed with her as first in the concourse mentioned in the famous diary.

Dacre was associated with Julian's atelier on two occasions:

1878–79 when she completed a striking black and white chalk drawing, Portrait of a Young Girl in a Satin Cap, ca. 1879, which is owned by the Andre Del Debbio Collection, Paris.

Later she accomplished several works that gained her entry to the Paris Salon. For example, her Salon entry in 1881 was a portrait: Portrait of Mme. F.W. (no 579.) Manchester Art Gallery own a poignant oil painting Italian Women In Church. Throughout her career her portraits were admired in Italy, England and Paris.

After living in London for a time she returned to Manchester in 1883 and shared a studio in 10 King Street with the artist Mary Florence Monkhouse. After much campaigning by both Dacre and Monkhouse in 1897 Dacre was made a member of the council of the Manchester Academy of Fine Arts and Monkhouse was appointed auditor.

At the Royal Jubilee Exhibition, Manchester 1887 she had her work on display, and assisted Ford Madox Brown with the decoration of the exhibition's dome.

== Women's suffrage campaigner ==
Dacre was a noted Women's suffrage campaigner. With Annie Swynnerton she founded the Manchester Society of Women Artists in 1876; Dacre also served as president of the organization. For a decade (1885–95), Dacre was a member of the executive committee of the Manchester National Society for Women's Suffrage.

Dacre's portrait of Lydia Becker is one of her best-known works.

== Bibliography ==
- Susan W Thomson, Manchester’s Victorian Art Scene And Its Unrecognised Artists, Manchester Art Press, 2007. ISBN 978-0-9554619-0-3
