= Annie Swynnerton =

English painter (1844–1933)

Annie Louisa Robinson Swynnerton ARA
- Annie Swynnerton in 1931
- Born: Annie Louisa Robinson; 26 February 1844; Hulme, Manchester, England
- Died: 24 October 1933 (aged 89); Hayling Island, England
- Education: Manchester School of Art, Académie Julian
- Spouse: Joseph Swynnerton

Annie Louisa Swynnerton, ARA (née Robinson; 26 February 1844 – 24 October 1933) was a British painter best known for her portrait and symbolist works. She studied at Manchester School of Art and at the Académie Julian, before basing herself in the artistic community in Rome with her husband, the monumental sculptor Joseph Swynnerton. Swynnerton was influenced by George Frederic Watts and Sir Edward Burne-Jones. John Singer Sargent appreciated her work and helped her to become the first elected woman member at the Royal Academy of Arts in 1922. Swynnerton painted portraits of Henry James and Millicent Fawcett. Her main public collection of works are in Manchester Art Gallery, but individual works are also held in a few other English cities, as well as can also be seen in Glasgow, Dublin, Paris, and two in Melbourne, Australia. Annie was a close friend of leading suffragists of the day, notably the Pankhurst family.

== Early life ==
Annie Louisa Robinson was born in Hulme, Manchester in 1844. (Note: Her birth record shows that she was born in the Chorlton registration district (Hulme was in that district). Her place of birth is also given as Kersal and Salford.) Her parents were Francis Robinson, a solicitor, and Ann Sanderson. Swynnerton had six sisters. She made and sold watercolours to supplement the family's income during a difficult financial period. Her sisters Julia and Emily also studied at Manchester School of Art, recorded as being prize-winning students in The Manchester Guardian in 1873 (24 Dec, p8.)

== Education ==
Swynnerton trained at the Manchester School of Art, beginning in 1871. She won a gold prize and a scholarship for an oil and watercolour painting. From 1874 to 1876, she studied in Rome along with her friend and fellow artist, Susan Isabel Dacre. The women then studied at the Académie Julian in Paris from 1877 to 1880. Swynnerton was influenced by the works of Jules Bastien-Lepage. She lived in Manchester in 1880 and by 1882 was living in London.

== Artist ==
=== Style ===
Annie painted portraits, figures, symbolist works and landscapes. George Frederic Watts and Sir Edward Burne-Jones were supporters of her career. According to Linda Murray, "She was much influenced by Watts, and many of her subjects were of the allegorical or symbolic type which was his forte. Her drawing was solid, and she had a sculptural grasp of form allied to fresh, broken colour displaying affinities with Impressionism. The catalogue for the Tate exhibition "Exposed. The Victorian Nude" states that "Rome based Annie Swynnerton was one of the most daring female painters of the nude, often shocking audiences with her robustly painted figures".

George Frederic Watts, Edward Burne-Jones, and Annie Louisa Swynnerton's works

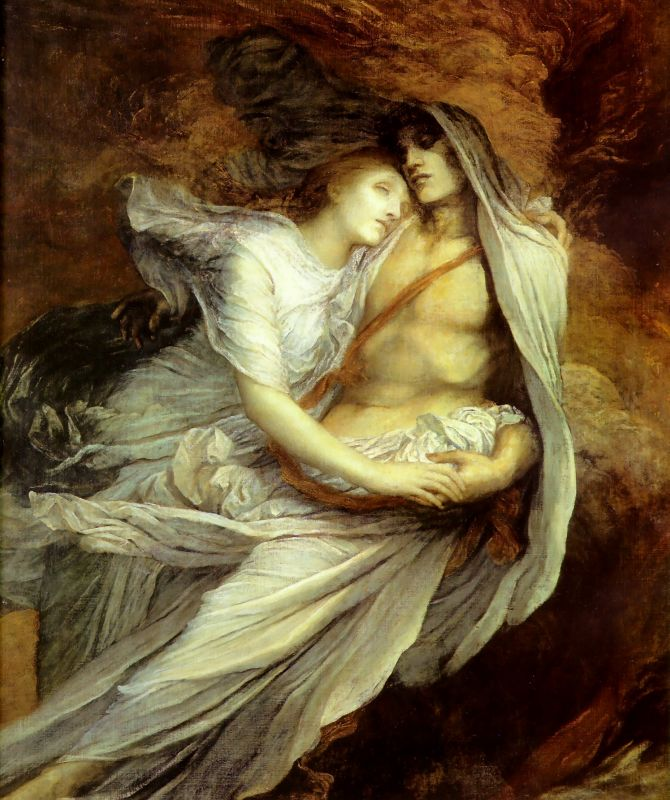
George Frederic Watts, Paolo and Francesca

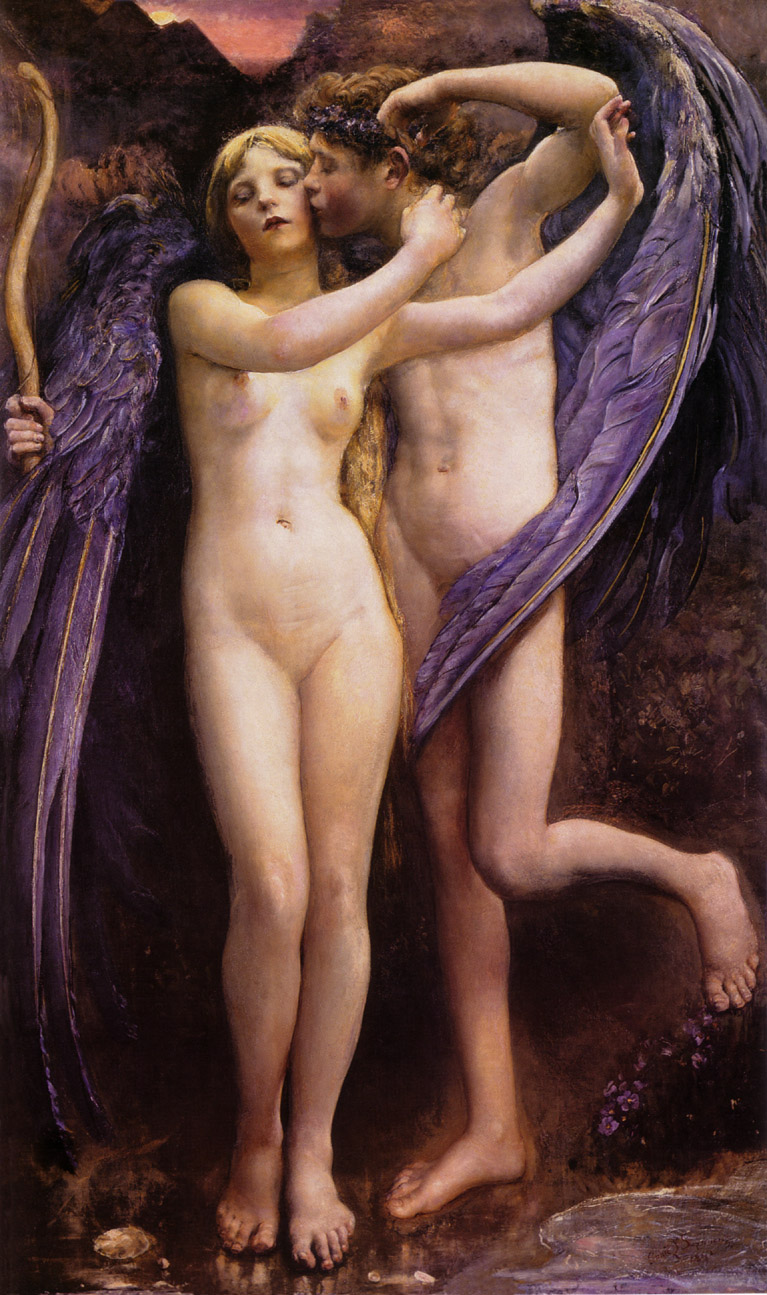
Annie Louisa Swynnerton, Cupid and Psyche, 1890, Gallery Oldham

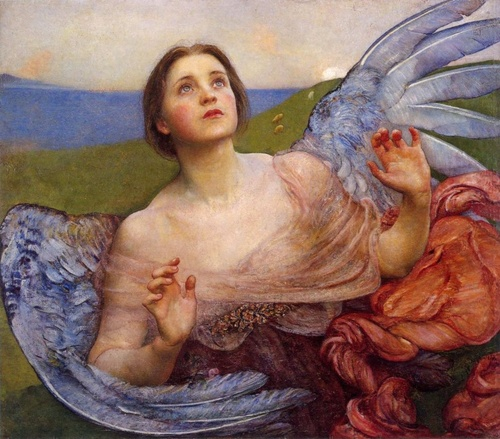
Annie Louisa Swynnerton, The Sense of Sight, oil on canvas, 1895, National Museums Liverpool

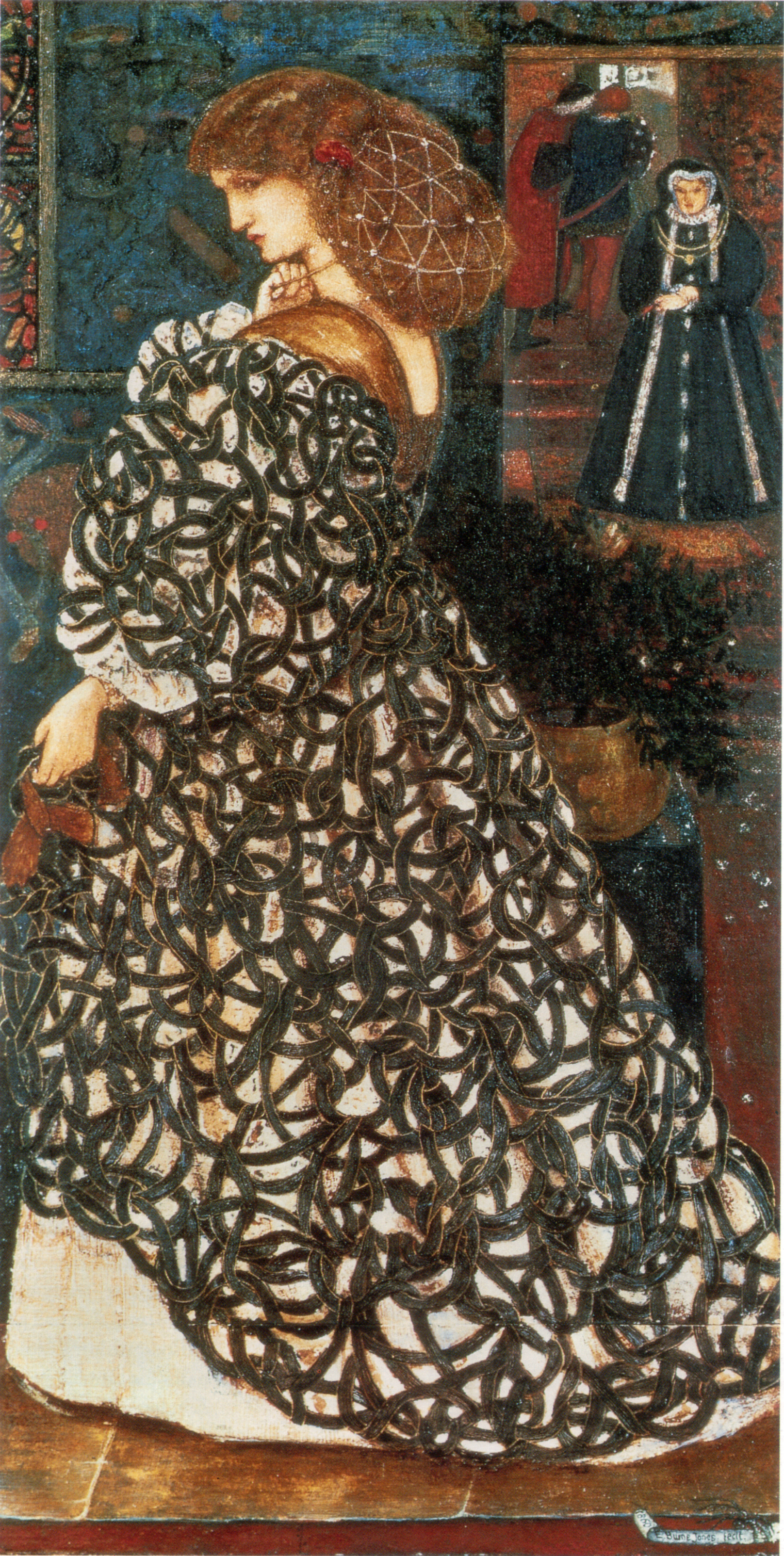
Edward Burne-Jones, Sidonia von Borcke, 1860

Swynnerton's works incorporated aspects of Neoclassicism, Pre-Raphaelitism and Impressionism. The Magazine of Art described one of her works, "[A] highly imaginative design by [Swynnerton] is Mater Triumphalis. The limbs of the figure are somewhat heavy in outline, whilst there is a certain metallic appearance in the colouring that is quite apart from the idea of the flowing life-blood in a human body." She was also adept at painting children.

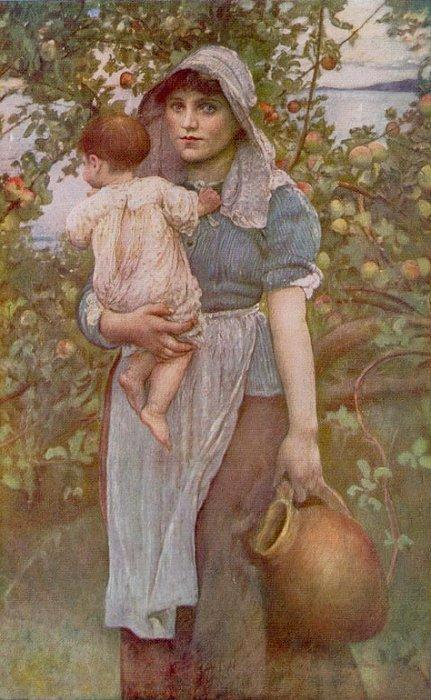
The Young Mother, c. 1887

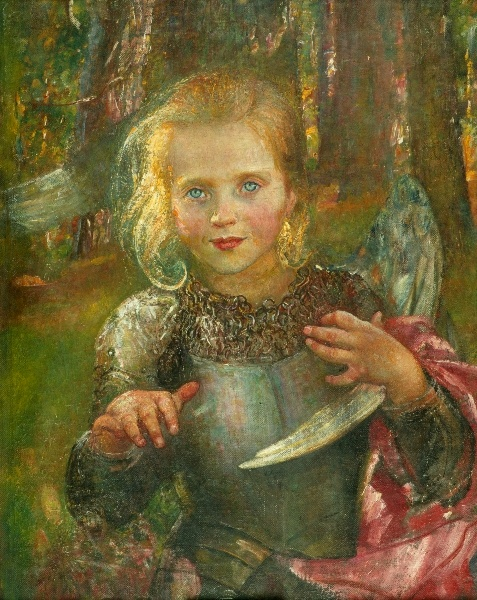
Illusions, oil on canvas, 1900, Manchester City Art Gallery

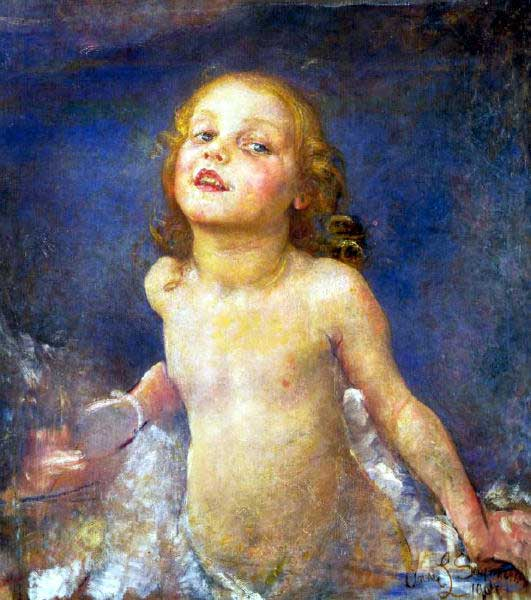
New Risen Hope, 1904

=== Career ===
Dacre and Swynnerton shared a studio. In 1879, the two women founded the Manchester Society of Women Painters, which offered art education and exhibitions. Emily Robinson was also a member. Swynnerton painted Dacre's portrait, which was exhibited in 1880 at the Royal Academy of Arts. It was given to Manchester Art Gallery by the sitter in 1932. She was the second woman to sit on the Liverpool Autumn Exhibition hanging committee in 1895.

Swynnerton painted portraits of members of the Garrett family, including Agnes Garrett, Dame Millicent Garrett Fawcett, which was purchased by the Chantrey Bequest for the nation and is at the Tate Gallery, and Louisa Garrett Anderson.

She painted portraits of people close to the Garretts, including Henry James and Rev. William Gaskell, husband of novelist Elizabeth Gaskell. Dame Ethel Smyth was a patron to Swynnerton. John Singer Sargent made a painting of Swynnerton and Smyth's sister, Mrs. Charles Hunter.

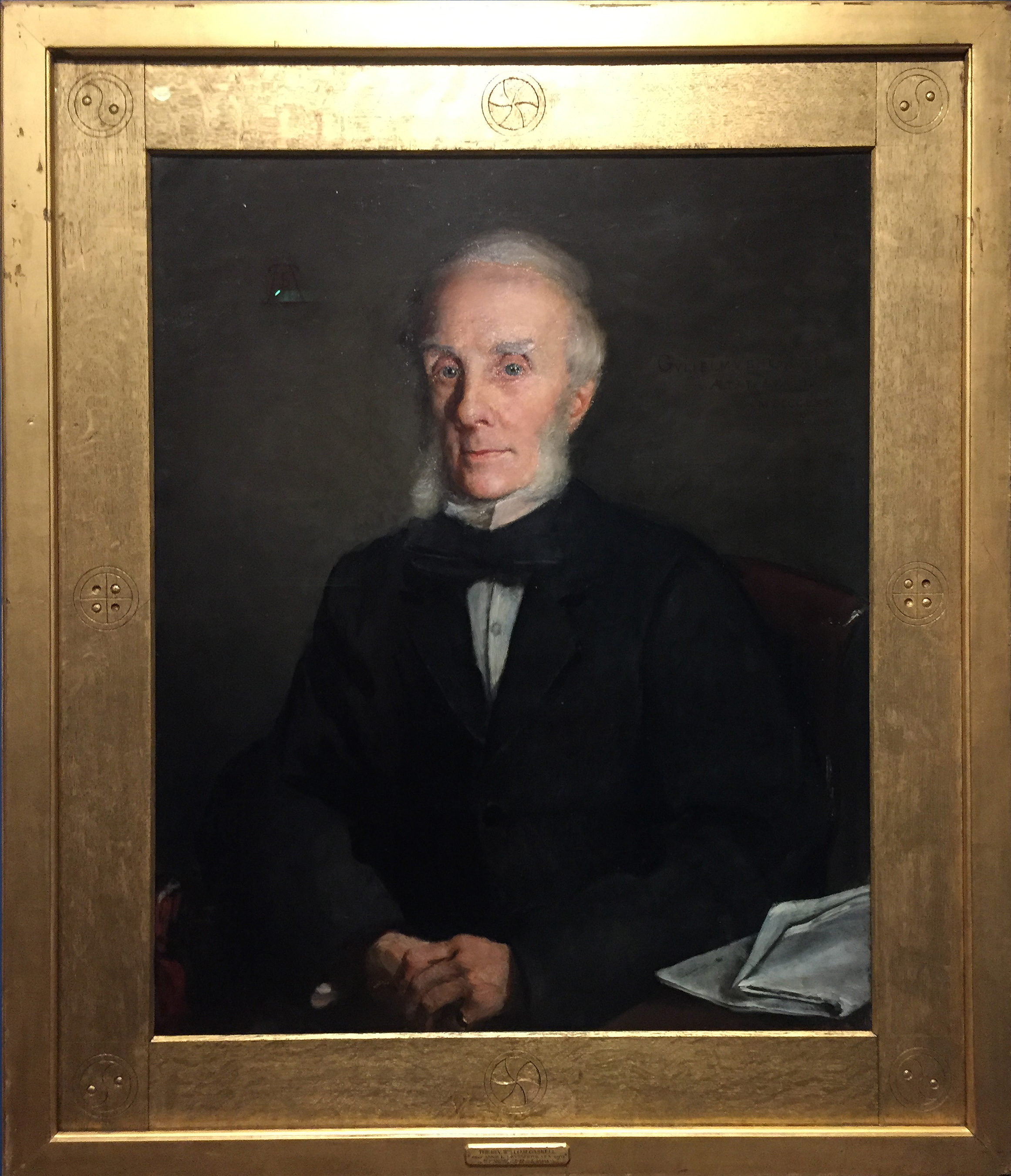
Rev William Gaskell, 1879

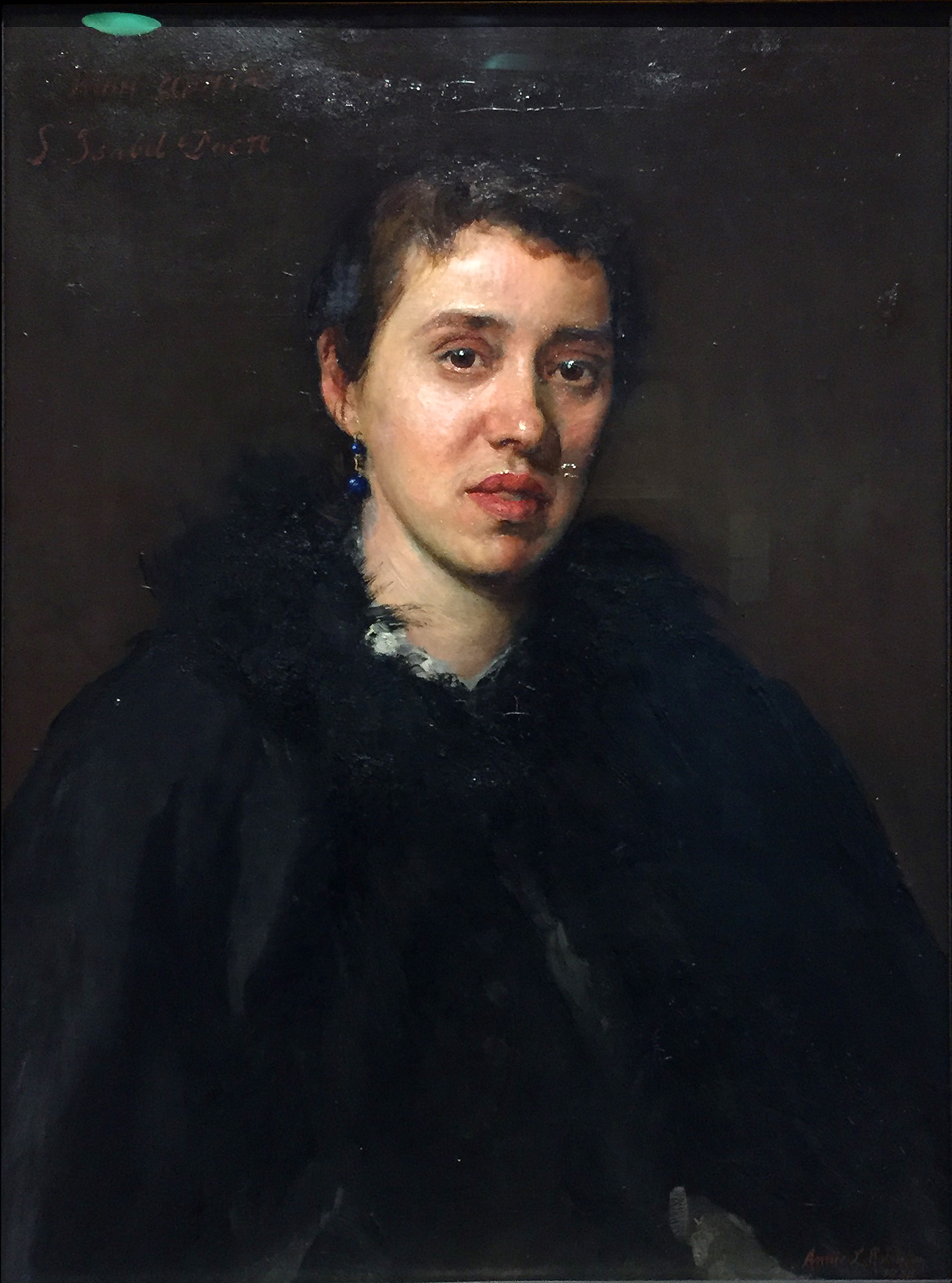
Susan Isabel Dacre, 1880

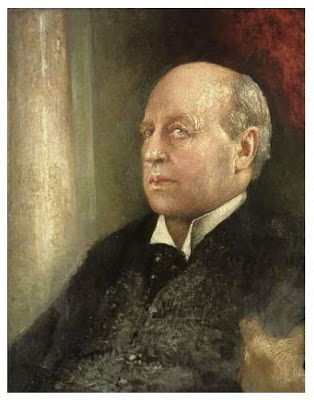
Henry James, by 1922

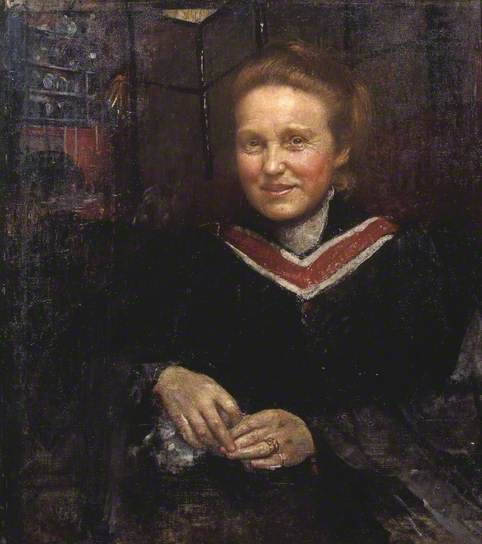
Dame Millicent Fawcett, CBE, LLD, Tate, by 1930

With an initial introduction by Burne-Jones, Swynnerton exhibited at the Royal Academy of Arts from 1879 to 1886 and then 1902 to 1934. John Singer Sargent appreciated and purchased her work. He gave the nation The Oreads made by Swynnerton. He was instrumental in her election in 1922 to become the first female associate of the Royal Academy since the 18th century and the first woman to be elected into the organisation. (Note: Two founding members of the Royal Academy of the Arts in 1768 were Mary Moser and Angelica Kauffman, but women could not attend life classes or hold office. Women were discouraged from studying at the school following Moser and Kauffman's deaths. The Oxford Dictionary of National Biography says that Swynnerton was the first woman since the 1800s to become an associate. The Royal Academy of Arts site say she was the first woman to be elected into the organisation (Moser and Kauffman were co-founders). Dame Laura Knight also became an associate member in the 1920s and became the first woman to become a full member in 1936.) Swynnerton's work was also exhibited at other national and international exhibitions, including Aberdeen, Doncaster, Huddersfield, Manchester, and Chicago and Pittsburgh. In 1893, Florence Nightingale at Scutari was shown at Women's Exhibition at the Chicago World's Exposition. According to Hellary Fraser, author of Women Writing Art History in the Nineteenth Century, the work showed the manner with which women artists could convey tender feeling with strong artistic composition and colour. Swynnerton was included in the 2018 exhibit Women in Paris 1850–1900.

== Suffragism ==
She was an active supporter of the women's suffrage movement of the time, and was a signatory to the 1889 National Union of Women's Suffrage Societies' Declaration in Favour of Women's Suffrage.

== Personal life ==
She met sculptor Joseph William Swynnerton, from the Isle of Man, possibly while the two were both living in Rome. They married in 1883 (Note: Gray says that they were married about 1886.) and lived primarily in Rome and had a studio in Shepherd's Bush in London. The Swynnertons were married until 1910, when he died.

Swynnerton's eyesight deteriorated in her later years. Following her husband's death, she lived in Chelsea, London and Rome, before finally settling on Hayling Island, England. She died there in 1933. There was a posthumous sale of the contents of her former studio, removed from 1A The Avenue, 76 Fulham Road, London, SW3 at Christie's in London on 9 February 1934. This included her own work (both finished and unfinished), her small collection of pictures by Old Masters (including Guercino and Moroni) together with frames and easels. In her will, and in memory of Susan Isabel Dacre, she left a bequest to Francis Dodd, an artist.

Swynnerton was described as follows:

She was a talented artist and an accomplished woman, though scarcely one of whom it could be said she possessed a charm of manner. Indeed, by maintaining the courage of her convictions she was at times embarrassingly outspoken. She had a slight stutter.

— Gladys Storey, Dickens and Daughter

== Collections ==
Collection	Location	Works
Aberdeen Art Gallery & Museums	Aberdeen, Scotland	Landscape with Trees
Ashmolean Museum of Art and Archaeology	Oxford, England	Head of a Bacchante
Birmingham Museums Trust	Birmingham, England	Assisi
Bradford Museums and Galleries	Bradford, England	Oceanid
Brighton and Hove Museums and Art Galleries	Brighton, England	Girl with a Lamb
Cheltenham Art Gallery & Museum	Cheltenham, England	Oil Sketch of a Pony
Gallery Oldham	Oldham, England	Cupid and Psyche
Glasgow Museums	Glasgow, Scotland	A Dryad; The Soul's Journey: The Soul's Awakening
Manchester Art Gallery	Manchester, England	Adoration of the Infant Christ (after Perugino); An Italian Mother and Child; Crossing the Stream; S. Isabel Dacre; The Dreamer; Reverend William Gaskell; Illusions; Interior of San Miniato, Florence; Italian Landscape; Montagna Mia; The Olive Gatherers; Rain Clouds, Monte Gennaro; Mrs A. Scott-Elliot and Children; The Southing of the Sun; The Town of Siena; The Vagrant
Metropolitan Museum of Art	New York City	Dream of Italy, owned by the museum in 1933
Musée d'Orsay	Paris, France	Mater Triumphalis
National Gallery of Victoria	Melbourne, Australia	New-risen Hope (Note: New-risen Hope at National Gallery of Victoria is a different version of the same theme as the New Risen Hope at Tate.); The Lady in White.
National Museums Liverpool	Liverpool, England	The Sense of Sight
Nottingham City Museums and Galleries	Nottingham, England	Mrs Florence H. Musgrave
Royal Academy of Arts	London, England	The Letter
Royal Holloway, University of London	London, England	Geoffrey and Christopher Herringham
Salford Museum & Art Gallery	Salford, England	Tryst
Tate Gallery	London, England	The Convalescent; Count Zouboff; Dame Millicent Fawcett, CBE, LLD; Miss Elizabeth Williamson on a Pony; New Risen Hope; Oreads

== See also ==
- List of English women artists
- Women Painters of the World, published 1905
