= Robert Costin =

British organist, harpsichordist and music educator

Robert Costin is a British organist, harpsichordist and music educator. His recordings include organ performances of Johann Sebastian Bach's Goldberg Variations, The Well-Tempered Clavier and The Art of Fugue. He has held cathedral and school music appointments in the United Kingdom and overseas.

== Life and career ==
Costin was a chorister at Peterborough Cathedral and a music scholar at Oundle School. He studied organ and harpsichord at the Royal Academy of Music before becoming an organ scholar at Pembroke College, Cambridge in 1990. He gained his Fellowship of the Royal College of Organists at the age of nineteen and graduated from Cambridge in 1993.

After graduating, he became assistant director of music at Wellington Cathedral of St Paul. During his time in New Zealand, he was a prizewinner at the first Hamilton International Organ Competition and served as interim director of music at Holy Trinity Cathedral, Auckland. He subsequently became assistant director of music at Blackburn Cathedral.

Costin held music teaching posts at Worksop College and Bedford School before becoming director of music at Ardingly College in 2007. He later served as head of music at St Louis School in Milan and director of music in the senior school at Rugby School Thailand, before becoming head of academic music at Sherborne School. He is head of visual and performing arts at Saint Mary's School in Raleigh, North Carolina.

His recital venues have included Westminster Abbey, St Paul's Cathedral and Saint Thomas Church Fifth Avenue in New York. Reviewing his April 2008 recital at Saint Thomas Church for MusicWeb International, Bruce Hodges singled out his performance of Herbert Howells's Partita.

In July 2013, Costin performed a selection from his organ adaptation of Bach's Goldberg Variations at Wellington Cathedral. Reviewing the recital for Middle C, Lindis Taylor praised his command of the instrument and variety of registration, while contrasting the performance's colour with the greater restraint of his Pembroke College recording.

In 2025, the Royal Academy of Music named Costin among the recipients of its Associateship (ARAM).

== Recordings ==
Costin's recordings include music by Bach, Howells, Franz Liszt and Julius Reubke. His Howells recording was made at Dunedin Town Hall, and his recording of works by Liszt and Reubke at Wellington Town Hall.

His recording of Bach's Goldberg Variations, released by Stone Records in 2013, was performed on the organ of Pembroke College, Cambridge. In The Independent, Andy Gill praised the instrument's sonorities and described the recording as a "marvellous, engrossing performance by a true master".

His recording of The Well-Tempered Clavier, released in 2017, was made on the Metzler organ of Trinity College Chapel, Cambridge. Gramophone praised his "consistently excellent playing". His subsequent recording of The Art of Fugue was made on the same instrument and released by First Hand Records in 2026.

The Classical Organ, released by First Hand Records in 2025, contains five organ sonatas by Carl Philipp Emanuel Bach and works for mechanical instruments by Joseph Haydn and Wolfgang Amadeus Mozart, recorded at Sherborne Abbey. Reviewing the album in Early Music Review, D. James Ross praised Costin's "refinement and elegance", but questioned the suitability of the organ's scale and tonal character for the repertoire.

== Discography ==
- Organ Triumphant (Kiwi Pacific Records)
- Herbert Howells Organ Music (Atoll Records)
- Liszt and Reubke Organ Works (Atoll Records)
- The Excellent Art of Voluntary (Atoll Records)
- Bach: Goldberg Variations (Stone Records)
- Bach: Trio Sonatas (Stone Records)
- Bach: The Well-Tempered Clavier, Books 1 & 2 (Stone Records)
- The Classical Organ (First Hand Records)
- Bach: The Art of Fugue (First Hand Records)
