= Pantheon of the Patriarchs of Lisbon =

Coordinates: 38.7147°N 9.1278°W

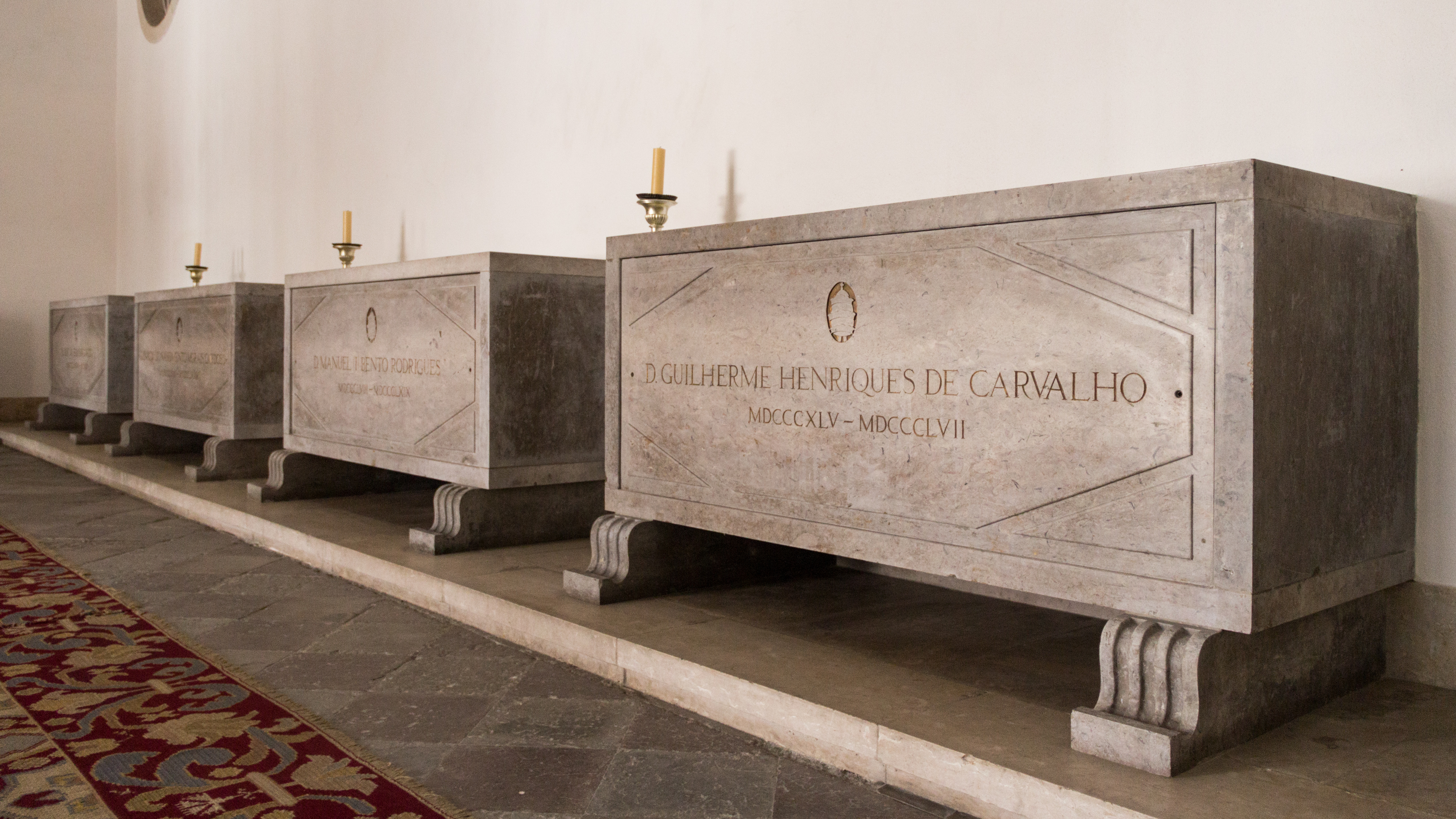
- View of the tombs.

Location
- Location: Monastery of São Vicente de Fora
- Interactive map of Pantheon of the Patriarchs of Lisbon

Architecture
- Style: Mannerist, Baroque, Neoclassic
- Groundbreaking: 1954

The Pantheon of the Patriarchs of Lisbon (Portuguese: Panteão dos Patriarcas de Lisboa), also known simply as the Pantheon of the Patriarchs, is the final resting place of the majority of the Cardinal-Patriarchs of Lisbon. It is located in the Monastery of São Vicente de Fora in the Alfama district of Lisbon, Portugal. The room is a simple chapel, mostly unadorned save for a stone altar. Even though it was planned since the 19th century, it was only built in the 1950s, and it is mostly unadorned save for a plain stone altar.

== History ==
Before its conversion to the Patriarch's pantheon, the room had served as the chapter house of the Canons Regular of Saint Augustine of the Monastery of São Vicente de Fora. At the time, it was decorated with azulejos and had choir stalls for the canons. Following the dissolution of the monasteries, the room lost its purpose and was used as a repository for papers of the Portuguese Army before being left vacant.

During the Estado Novo, the empty room was ceded by the Portuguese Government to the Patriarchate of Lisbon to be converted into the Patriarchs' burial place. The works were concluded in 1954, and the remains of previous Patriarchs – up until then kept beneath the wooden chests in the Monastery sacristy – were re-interred there in late 1955.

== Burials ==
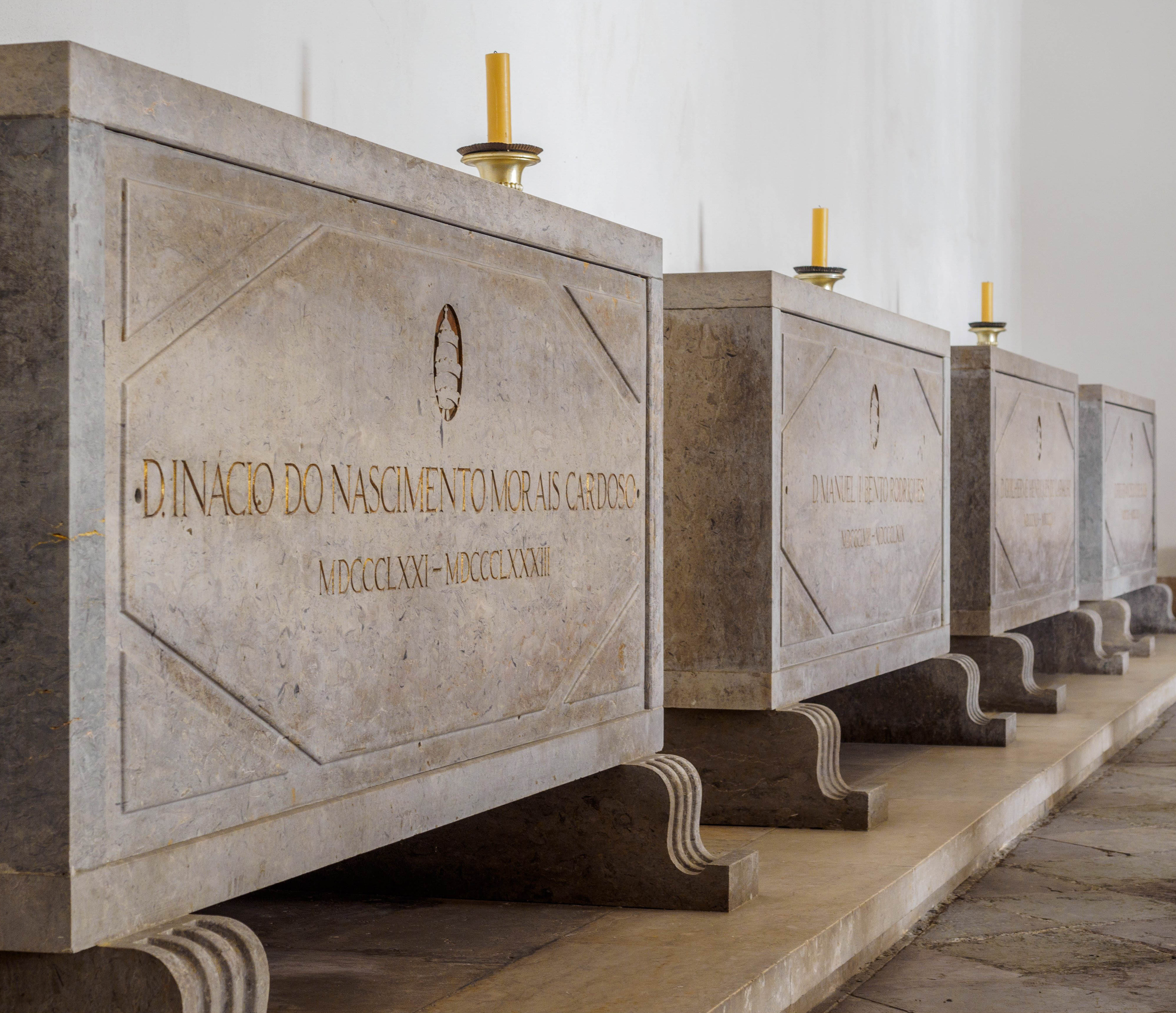
View of the funeral chests in the Pantheon.

The following Cardinal-Patriarchs are interred in the Pantheon:

- D. Carlos da Cunha e Meneses (1759–1825)
- D. Patrício da Silva (1756–1840)
- D. Francisco de São Luís Saraiva (1766–1845)
- D. Guilherme Henriques de Carvalho (1793–1857)
- D. Manuel Bento Rodrigues da Silva (1800–1869)
- D. Inácio do Nascimento Morais Cardoso (1811–1883)
- D. José Sebastião de Almeida Neto (1841–1920)
- D. António Mendes Bello (1842–1929)
- D. Manuel Gonçalves Cerejeira (1888–1977)
- D. António Ribeiro (1928–1998)
- D. José da Cruz Policarpo (1936–2014)

The earliest Cardinal-Patriarchs are buried elsewhere. The first, Cardinal D. Tomás de Almeida (1670–1754) is interred in the Church of Saint Roch, in Lisbon. The remains of D. José Manoel da Câmara (1686–1758) lie in the Church of Our Lady of the Assumption in Atalaia, Vila Nova da Barquinha. D. Francisco de Saldanha da Gama (1723–1776) and D. Fernando de Sousa e Silva (1712–1786) are buried in the church of Jerónimos Monastery. D. José Francisco de Mendonça (1725–1808) was buried in the church of the Convent of Graça, also in Lisbon.
