= Procession of the Bom Jesus dos Passos in Macau =

Oldest Catholic procession in Far East Asia

Procession of the Bom Jesus dos Passos in Macau Novena e Festa em Honra do Senhor Bom Jesus dos Passos (Portuguese) 苦難耶穌九日敬禮 (Chinese)
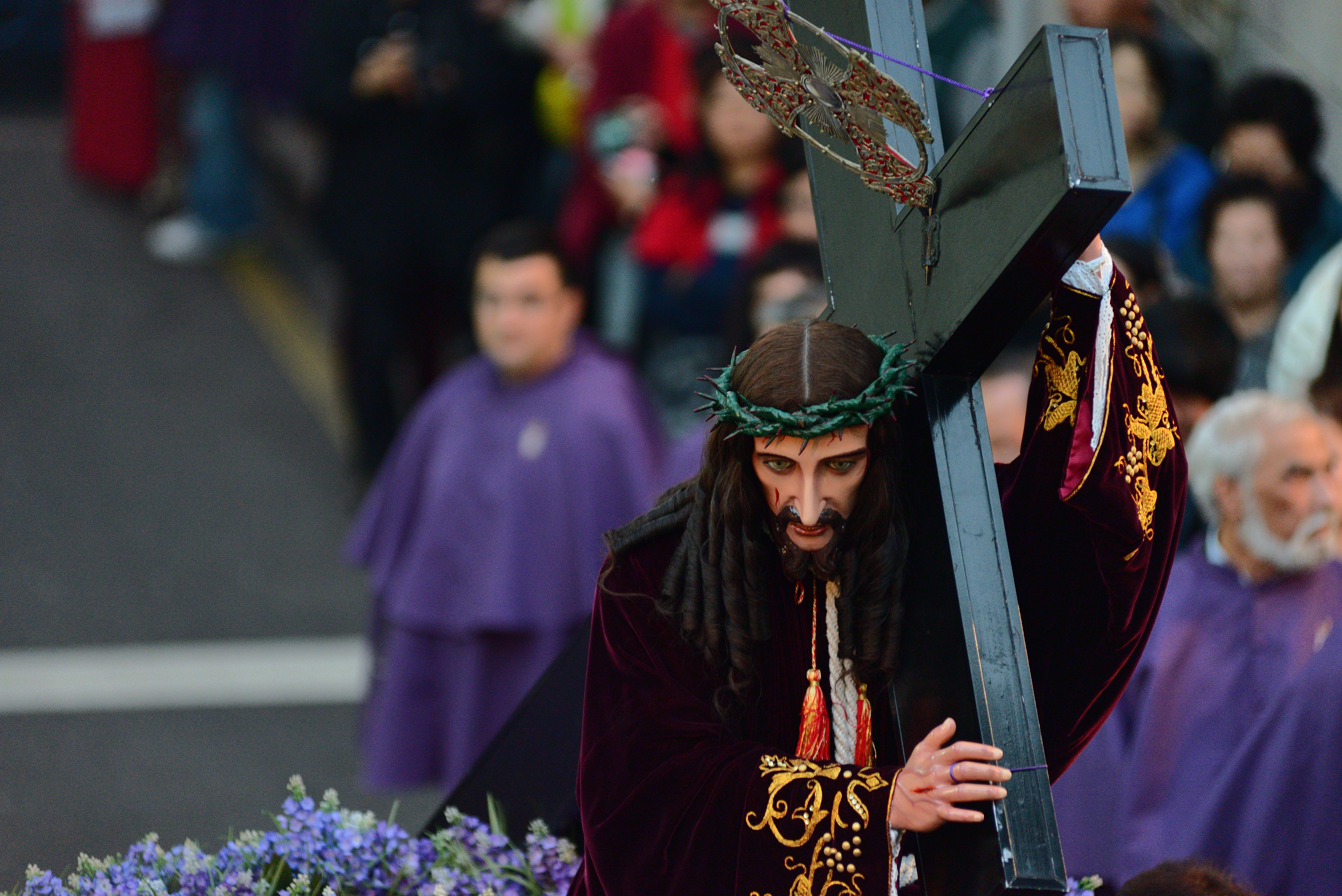
- Procession of the Bom Jesus dos Passos
- Status: Active
- Genre: Procession
- Date: Quadragesima Sunday
- Frequency: Annual
- Location: Macau
- Most recent: February 22

The Procession of the Bom Jesus dos Passos in Macau (also known as the Procession of the Great Jesus in Chinese or the Procissão em Honra do Senhor Bom Jesus dos Passos in Portuguese) is the most famous Catholic procession in honor of Jesus Christ organized in Macau about forty days before Easter. The main purpose of the devotion is for the Catholic Church to remind its members and believers at the beginning of Lent to remember the Passion of Christ and prepare them for the celebrations of the Holy Week.

The two-day procession of the Senhor Bom Jesus dos Passos (The Good Lord Jesus of the Steps) is part of a more extensive novena in honor of Our Lord in His Agony.

It is similar to other Processions of the Bom Jesus dos Passos, such as in Florianópolis in Brazil or the Procession of Our Lord of the Passion of Graça in Portugal, which has been celebrated since 1587.

== History ==
=== Background: the Portuguese mission in Macau ===
The Portuguese first settled in Macau in the year of 1557, as a trading port between the East and the West, and survived there for almost two hundred years before obtaining the approval of the Qing dynasty in 1749. In 1887, Macau became a colony of Portugal until it reverted to China in the year 1999. Formally established in 1576, the Diocese of Macau is the oldest diocese in the Far East in continuous existence: around 5% of population (30,000 people) is Roman Catholic.

=== Folk legends ===
Along the historical development of the devotion of the Bom Jesus which was expressed by the solemn procession in Macau, urban legends were, and are still well spread.

==== The legend of the guardian ====
One legend about the origin of this particular statue of Jesus in Macau says that on a deep winter night, the sleeping sexton heard someone knocking on the cathedral door, but did not answer the call. The Hallowed Guest thus went to Saint Augustine Church, where the statue is kept throughout the year, and processed back to the Cathedral once a year to spend that missed winter night.

==== The legend of the Chinese New Year Storm ====
Another story claims that after a terrible storm, huge wooden crates were washed ashore. Inside were mountable body parts that were pieced together to form the miraculous statue. Locals affectionately call it “Daai Yea So” in Cantonese, “The Grand Jesus.”

==== The legend of the Bom Jesus hill ====
The devotion to the Bom Jesus has grown so much in Macau that even English travellers in the 1940s were aware of legends that anyone who would dare build on the hill of the Bom Jesus would immediately die.

=== Historical outline ===
==== Portuguese devotion dating back to 1587 ====
The procession of the Bom Jesus dos Passos of Macau is similar to the Bom Jesus dos Passos procession held in Portuguese capital of Lisbon since 1587. Both processions have many common elements which are signs of antiquity, one of them being their peculiar Via Crucis with only seven stations, in contrast to the Via Crucis with 14 stations as promoted by Leonard of Port Maurice and became the standard in the 17th century.

The immemorial procession in Macau takes place between two churches, the Church of Saint Augustine (Nossa Senhora da Graça) built 1591 and the Sé Catedral da Natividade de Nossa Senhora built in 1576, just around the time of the birth of this Portuguese devotion. The Church of Nossa Senhora da Graça, run by the Brotherhood of Senhor Bom Jesus dos Passos, has always been the shrine and devotional center for Nosso Senhor dos Passos.

The Confraternity of Nosso Senhor Bom Jesus dos Passos was established in Macau shortly after the Augustinians arrived in Macau from the Philippines in 1586, for in that year the Passos procession first took place.

==== Restored by popular demand ====
In 1717, the celebration was suspended when the Augustinian friars caring for the image were banished to Goa. A great famine followed, and Macanese merchants went to the City Chancellor on the 14 February 1721 to ask that the "wooden man" carried on the people's backs come out onto the street again, at their own expense. The procession was done and the famine ended.

==== Replacement of the image ====
The earliest recorded statue of the Bom Jesus was made of wood and its scaffold came from Brazil, being brought by Commander Domingos Pio Marques, who arrived here on the ship Ulisses on 14 October 1818; he had gone to Rio de Janeiro as a deputy from Macau to attend festivities for the acclamation of King John VI of Portugal on 6 February 1818.

The old image that existed in the Church of Santo Agostinho, a century ago, went to Timor. Count Bernardino de Senna Fernandes, treasurer of the Brotherhood of the Bom Jesus dos Passos, offered on 12 February 1876, one hundred patacas to buy a new image that he himself ordered from Paris.

In addition to this image, there was another smaller one that was in the Brotherhood's session room and to which the wife of Governor José Maria Lobo d'Ávila (1874–1876) offered a rich tunic; On February 10, 1884, this tunic was offered to the Missions of Timor.

On January 17, 1907, a Portuguese from Hong Kong, João Joaquim Gomes, offered a scaffold with its frame to carry the image.

The image from Paris arrived in 1876 and was used for processions through the streets of Macau for 34 years. With the revolution that overthrew the monarchy and established the First Portuguese Republic on 5 October 1910, of that year, we do not know whether due to a decrease in Faith or physical strength, the Brothers found it too heavy. In 1911, the Portuguese Republic decreed that all religious practice should be confined to designated religious buildings, intending to minimise the ecclesial influence in the newly formed secular state. The Passos did not comply with this law, but during the session of the Confraria, on April 5, 1911, it was decided to replace the large statue with a lighter one, causing an uproar among the conservative faithful of Macao who were strongly attached to this solemn devotion.

==== Extension of the devotion in the 1955s ====
When the Macanese emigrated to Hong Kong and other ports in China in the 1950s, the devotion to the Senhor dos Passos became more deeply rooted in Macanese Catholic life to the point that the practice was brought to newer places. In Hong Kong, an annual procession organized by the Brotherhood takes place at the Cathedral of the Immaculate Conception at Mid-Levels on the First Sunday of Lent while at Rosary Church in Tsim Sha Tsui, a replica is exposed for veneration over a fortnight (to coincide with novenas in Macau and Hong Kong), a custom old residents say must be at least fifty years old.

=== Between health concerns and touristic frenzy in the 21st century ===
Today, the Passos is officially enlisted as one of the 12 intangible cultural heritage items of Macau. For years, faithful from Hong Kong and elsewhere have flocked to Macau to take part in the Novena and especially the procession of the Bom Jesus. Since at least the 1970s, the Bom Jesus has attracted tourists from abroad and been recognized a part of the folklore of Macau. During the coronavirus pandemic, the grand procession stopped due to COVID-19; it was instead held at a smaller scale within the courtyard of the Diocesan Seminary of Macau.

Since the establishment of the Portuguese Republic in 1910, no nobility had been present at the event. However, in 2024, Dom Duarte Pio, Duke of Braganza, one of several pretenders to the Portuguese throne and Head of the House of Braganza, joined the procession as an ordinary penitent.

Though the Passos can be seen to be a folkloric tradition, after all, such a religious practice entails a history of more than a hundred years. It still retains its religious appeal. It not only touches the individual on the three levels of emotion, mind and spirit but also through a long-term collective experience, a call for a collective identity is also formed. This allows the devotees in Macau to bear a uniqueness.

== Ritual ==
=== Novena ===
A nine-day prayer or novena that precedes the feast is very popular, always held on the first Sunday of Lent in the Church of Saint Augustine.

=== Procession ===
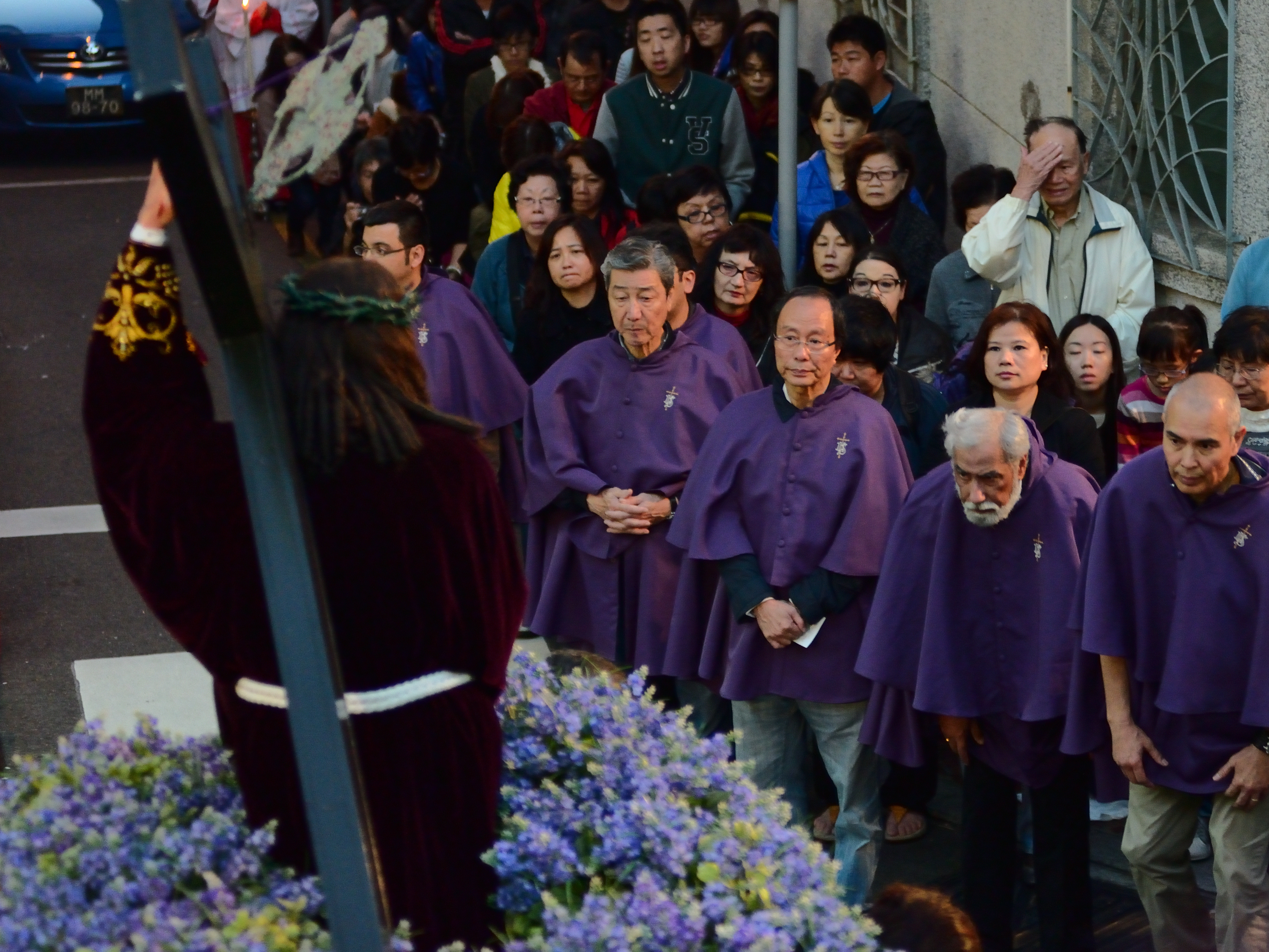
Penitents are seen taking part in the Procession of the Bom Jesus dos Passos.

The procession "represents the journey of Jesus Christ and the procession takes place over two days. It begins at the Church of St. Augustine and around St. Augustine Square and goes to Macau Cathedral, before making the reverse course on the second day."

At the beginning of the 19th century, the Swedish merchant Anders Ljungstedt described the procession in these words: "The Redeemer — an image the size of a man — covered in a purple cloak, carrying a crown of thorns on his head and a heavy cross on his shoulder, bends one knee on the bottom of a scaffold, carried by eight of the most distinguished citizens. The bishop, with the secular and regular clergy, the governor, the ministers, the nobility, the military and the entire Roman Catholic population, can be said to watch, deeply moved by a scene that foretells the divine sacrifice that will be made to reconcile man with his Creator. Children — with light and dark faces — dressed in angel dresses, with beautiful muslin wings on their shoulders, carry the miniature instruments, which were used for the crucifixion. This procession runs through almost the entire city; when finished, the image is deposited in its sanctuary in the Convent of S. Agostinho."

To this day, after a conventual Mass on Saturday morning at the Church of Saint Augustine, a Via Crucis in Chinese takes place in the afternoon, followed by the Vigil Mass and the Via Crucis in Portuguese or Cantonese. At 7 pm, the statue of the cross-bearing Bom Jesus, (veiled in purple lace to symbolize Our Lord being brought to trial), is carried down to the Sé Catedral da Natividade de Nossa Senhora.

The procession is made according to a certain order. At the time when the convents were full of friars - Franciscans, Dominicans and Augustines, in addition to the numerous Jesuits of St. Paul and St. Joseph and the entire diocesan clergy, all either with their religious habits or with their black cloaks and bishop at the front, this procession must have been very imposing.

During the procession, a young woman representing Veronica dressed in white and holding an icon of the Holy Face of Jesus Christ leads the way. She is followed by the Little Angels with the instruments of the Lord's Passion, throwing flowers. The Dean or the Representative of the Cathedral Chapter leads the procession, escorted by the magenta-clad members of the Confraria (Confraternity in Portuguese). The Macau Police Brass Band provides the beating march music to this annual event. The Bishop of Macau welcomes the Statue at the cathedral and the vigil concludes with a sermon in Portuguese.

On Sunday, the statue is brought back to St. Augustine's Church through the major thoroughfares of the city centre. The bishop, carrying the relic of the True Cross under a canopy, participates in the procession together with the Canons, clergy, twelve children dressed in white, torch-bearers and banner-bearers representing each parish.

== Music ==
A young girl is chosen each year to perform the role of Veronica, and sings the O vos omnes while unveiling the cloth depicting the Holy Face each time the procession stops for a stational shrine. The faithful all respond likewise in Latin singing Parce Domine with the short refrain Senhor Deus, misericordia in Portuguese. In the Sunday procession, the classic hymn sung is called “Joe Sousa Misericórdia”, usually sang by a tenor.

The procession is accompanied by the brass band, which plays traditional tunes, including an arrangement of the Marche funèbre for piano written by Frédéric Chopin in 1837, which became the 3rd movement of his Piano Sonata No. 2 in B-flat minor, Op. 35.

== See also ==
- Procession of Our Lord of the Passion of Graça
