= Carlos da Cunha e Meneses =

Portuguese cardinal (1759–1825)

His Eminence Carlos da Cunha e Meneses
- Cardinal, Patriarch of Lisbon
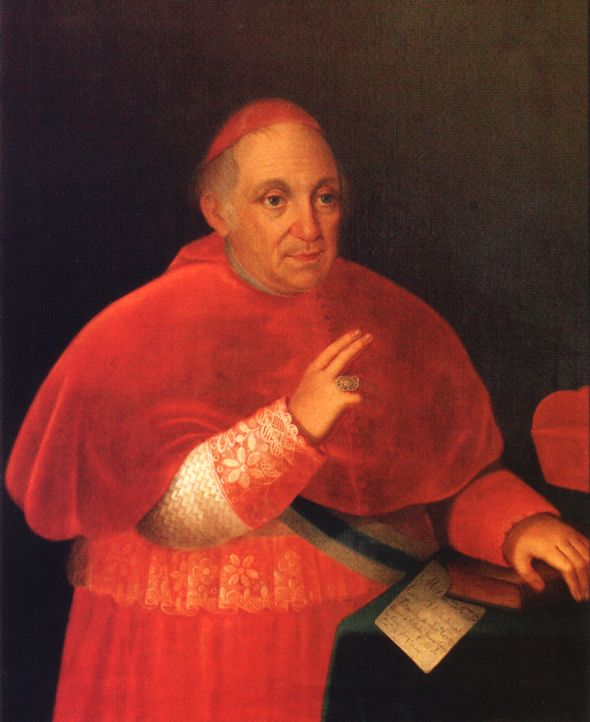
- Portrait of the Cardinal-Patriarch by an unknown author
- Church: Patriarchal Cathedral of Saint Mary Major
- Archdiocese: Lisbon
- Appointed: 23 August 1819
- Retired: 14 December 1825
- Predecessor: José Francisco Miguel António de Mendonça
- Successor: Patrício da Silva

Orders
- Ordination: 4 June 1784
- Consecration: 19 December 1819 by José António Pinto de Mendonça Arrais
- Created cardinal: 27 September 1819 by Pope Pius VII
- Rank: Cardinal-Priest

Personal details
- Born: 9 April 1759 Santa Engrácia, Lisbon, Portugal
- Died: 14 December 1825 (aged 66) Lisbon, Portugal
- Buried: Pantheon of the Patriarchs of Lisbon
- Denomination: Roman Catholic

Carlos da Cunha e Meneses (Santa Engrácia, Lisbon, 9 April 1759 – Lisbon, 14 December 1825) was a Portuguese Cardinal, politician and sixth Patriarch of Lisbon, serving under the name D. Carlos I.

== Biography ==
He was the son of Dom Pedro José da Cunha de Mendonça e Meneses, 4th Lord of Valdigem (by hereditary right), and his wife, Joana Catarina de Melo.
He served as principal presbyter of the Patriarchal, before being elected Patriarch on 4 July 1818. Pope Pius VII elevated him to the cardinalate in 1819. He was consecrated on 19 December 1819, by Dom José António Pinto de Mendonça Arrais, Bishop of Guarda. He never went to Rome to receive the red hat and the title, nor did he participate in the conclave of 1823, which elected Pope Leo XII.

He served as a Councilor of State and as a member of the Regency of the realm during the absence of King John VI, until 15 September 1820.

The Liberal Revolution of August 1820 put an end to the Old Regime. The Cortes drafted a new constitution and the new government, appointed by the deputies, made King John VI return from Brazil in July 1821.

Carlos da Cunha refused to swear allegiance to the articles 10 and 17 of the new Constitution, which focused on religious matters. This decision caused him to be confined in the Buçaco convent and on 2 April 1821, deported from Portugal, taking up residence in Bayonne (France). After the counter-revolutionary Vilafrancada on 27 May 1823, he returned to Lisbon at the invitation of King John VI, with a solemn entry on 18 August. He was also awarded the Grand Cross of the Order of the Immaculate Conception of Vila Viçosa by the monarch.

From this date until his death, he constituted a stronghold of the counter-revolution. He continued to defend the conservative position against freedom of the press, unwilling to agree with what he claims to be impiety and false philosophy intended to destroy even the bases of royal power. He also prohibited the reading of several works such as Portrait of Venus, Salvation of the Innocents, Response or objection to this pamphlet, Lusitanian Citizen, Discovered Superstitions and Reckoning with the court of Rome.

He died in the Junqueira Palace in Lisbon, on 14 December 1825. His remains rest in the Pantheon of the Patriarchs of Lisbon, in the Monastery of São Vicente de Fora, in Lisbon.
