= Procession of Our Lord of the Passion of Graça =

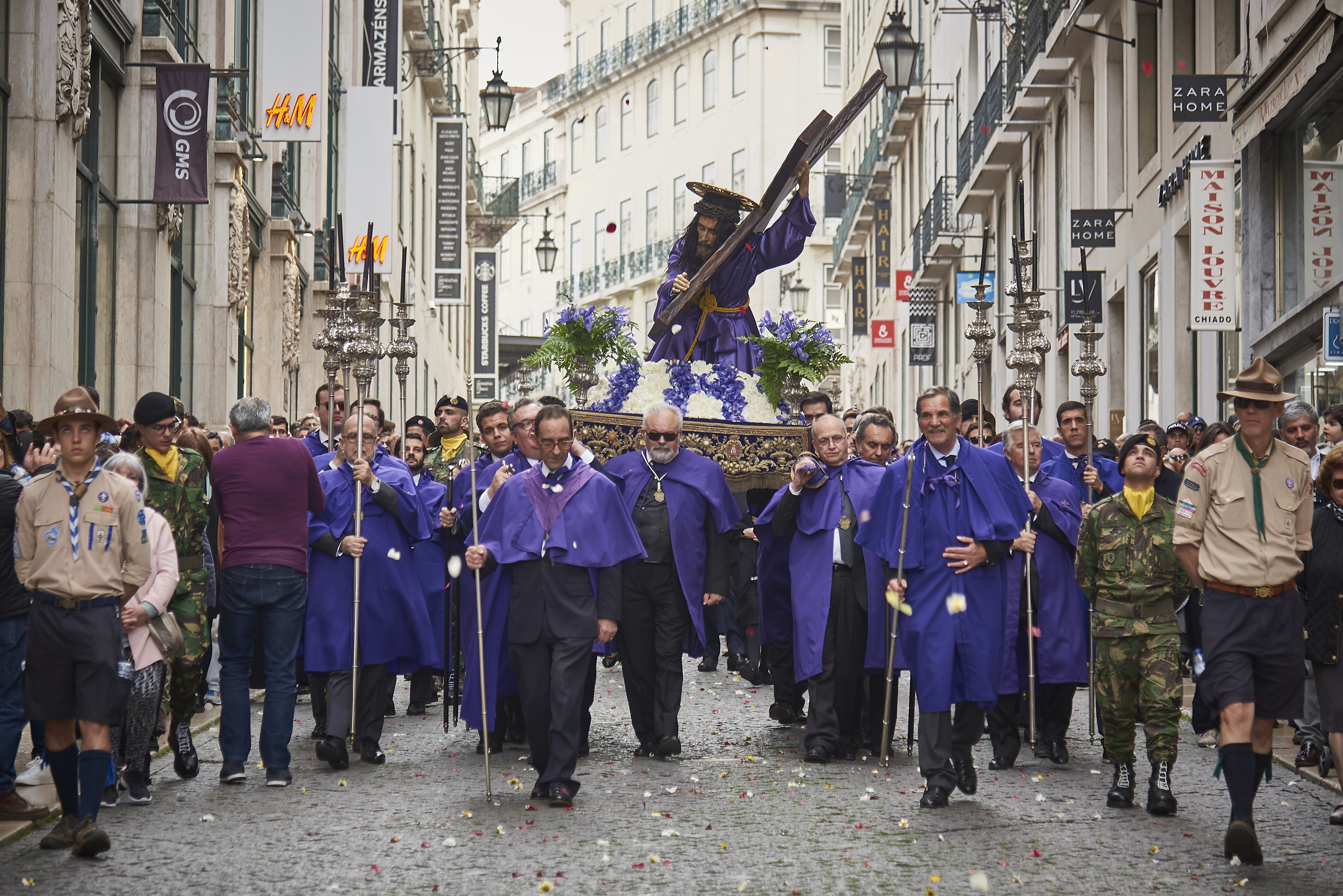
The Procession of Our Lord of the Passion of Graça, in 2020

The Procession of Our Lord of the Passion of Graça (Portuguese: Procissão do Senhor dos Passos da Graça), alternatively, the Procession of Our Lord of the Stations of the Cross of Graça) is one of the oldest and most important religious processions, which takes place yearly in the city of Lisbon, Portugal, on the Second Sunday of Lent. The procession has been held uninterruptedly since 1587, and it is organised by the Royal Brotherhood of the Holy Cross and Stations of the Cross of Graça (Portuguese: Real Irmandade da Santa Cruz e Passos da Graça).

The faithful go in solemn procession, from the Church of Saint Roch in Bairro Alto to Graça Convent in São Vicente, in emulation of the Via Dolorosa, the path taken by Jesus on the way to His crucifixion on Mount Calvary, making seven stops along the way that correspond to some of the episodes of the Passion narrative. These are:

1. Church of Saint Roch (Jesus is condemned to death and takes up His Cross)
2. Church of the Incarnation (Jesus falls under the weight of the Cross)
3. Church of Saint Dominic (Jesus meets His Mother, where the image of Our Lady of Solitude joins the procession)
4. Chapel of Our Lady of Good Health (Jesus meets the women of Jerusalem)
5. Station of Largo do Terreirinho (Veronica wipes the face of Jesus)
6. Birthplace of St. John de Britto in Calçada de Santo André (Simon of Cyrene helps Jesus carry the Cross)
7. Graça Convent (Jesus is nailed to the Cross, dies, and is laid in the tomb)

== History ==
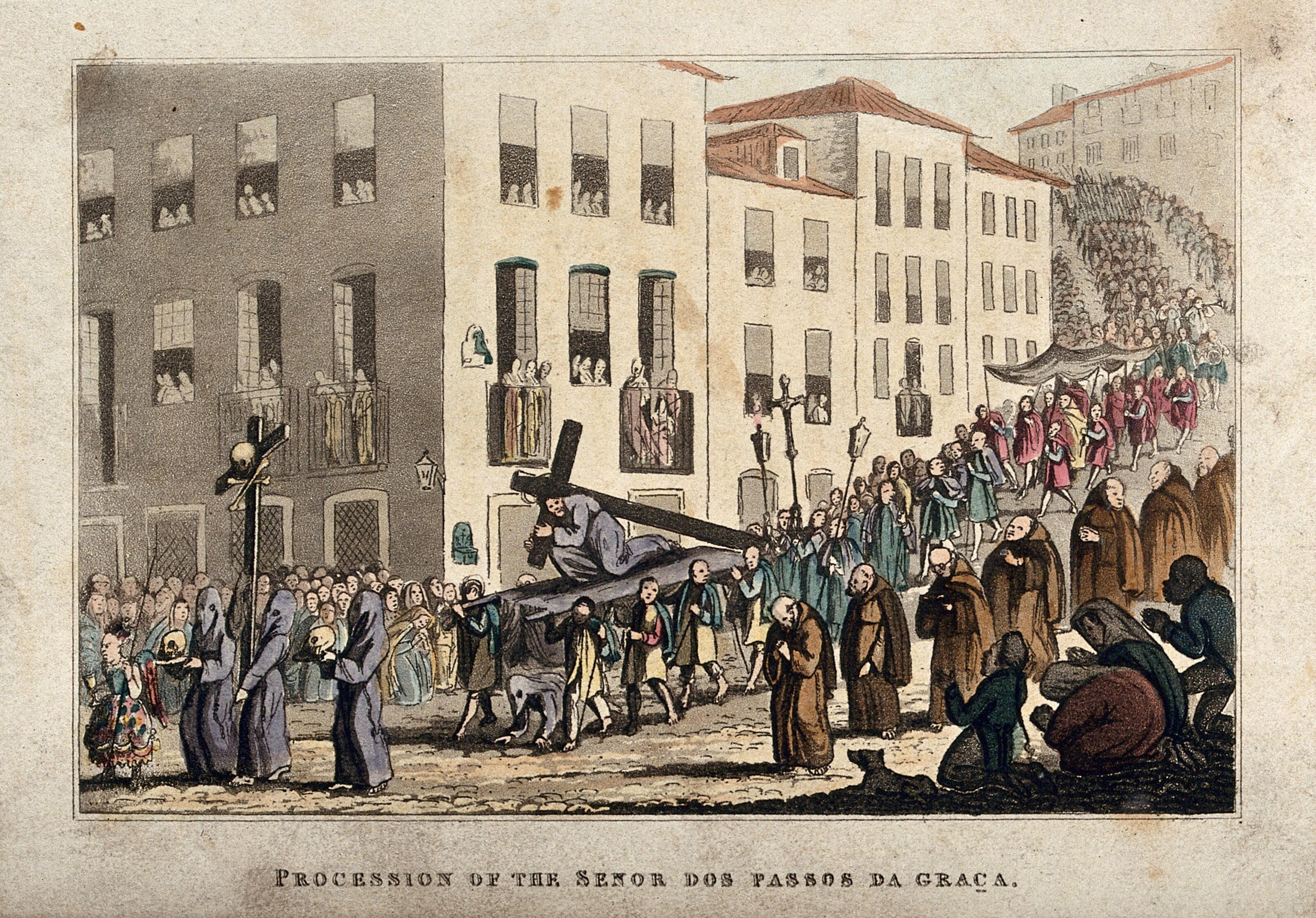
The Procession of Our Lord of the Passion in an 1826 aquatint (Wellcome Collection)

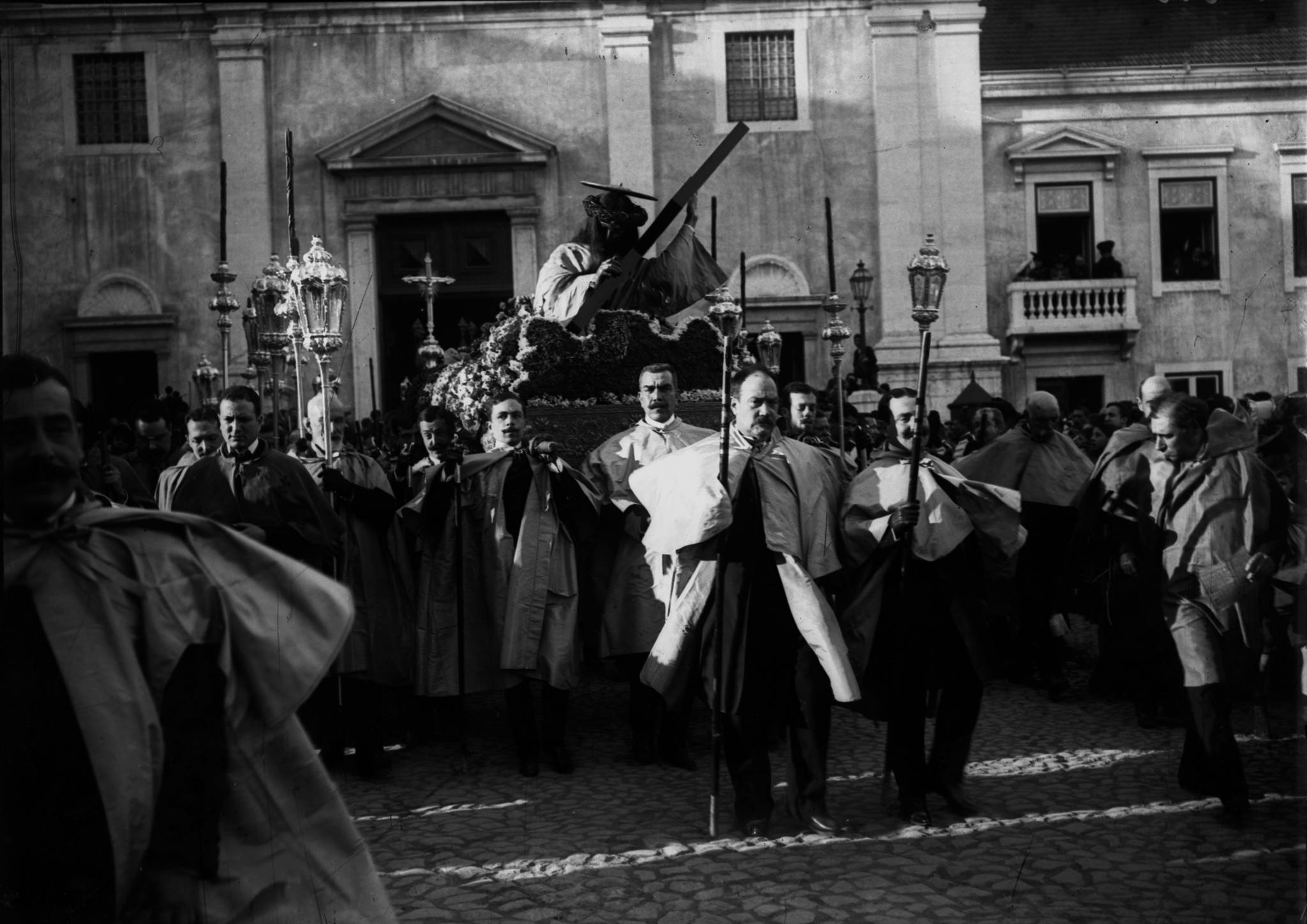
The Procession of Our Lord of the Passion departing the Church of Saint Roch in the early 20th century

The Procession of Our Lord of the Passion of Graça began through the initiative of Luís Álvares de Andrade (c. 1550–1631), court painter, of instituting a brotherhood of devotion to the True Cross, in 1587: with its growth and great distinction of its brothers, it soon began a tradition of holding a procession for the contemplation of the Stations of the Cross. Fr. Jorge Cardoso says, in his work Agiológio Lusitano, that it was Miguel de Castro, the Archbishop of Lisbon himself, that, with Luís Álvares, defined the route of the procession and the places where the stations would be.

After the 5 October 1910 revolution and the anticlericalist First Portuguese Republic and until 2013, the procession took a shorter route, fully within the limits of the parish of Graça (the single exception being the year 1987, on the 400th anniversary of the Brotherhood). In 2013, during a period of renewal of the Brotherhood's human resources, the "Long Procession" (Portuguese: Procissão Grande) was resumed, following the original route between the Church of Saint Roch and the Graça Convent.

In 2021, during the COVID-19 pandemic, the procession — which that year would fall on 28 February — was not open to the public for the first time in 434 years. Following instructions of the Portuguese Episcopal Conference, the Board of the Brotherhood decided to hold instead a smaller ceremony presided by the auxiliary bishop Américo Aguiar, Titular Bishop of Dagnum, which was transmitted online and through radio. At the end of the ceremony, the traditional blessing of the city was held. Among those in the restricted attendance was Marcelo Rebelo de Sousa, the President of the Republic.

== Recovery of the Station of Santo André ==
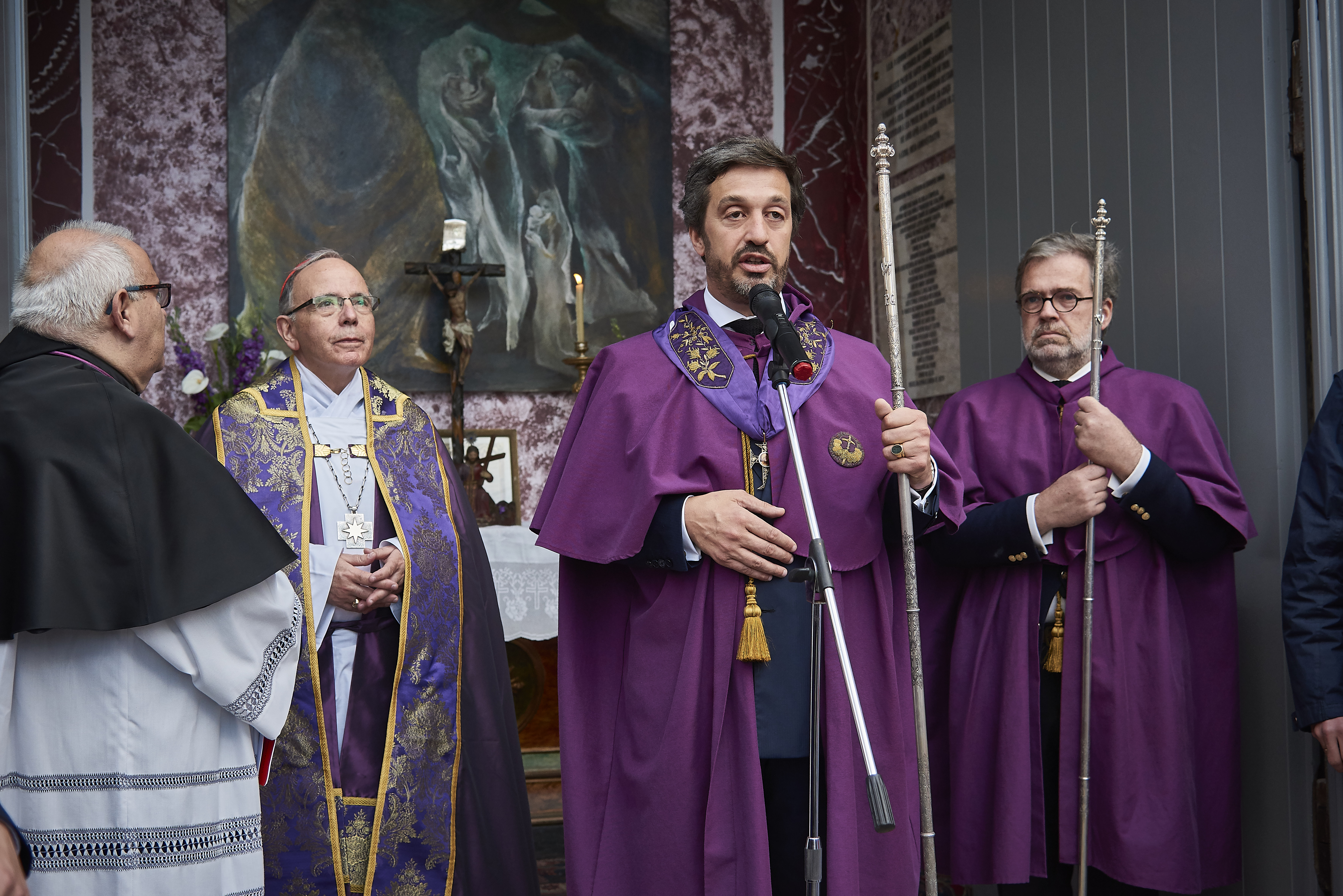
Reinauguração do Passo de Santo André, Largo Rodrigues de Freitas, 2020.

On 6 August 2019, the Royal Brotherhood of the Holy Cross and Stations of the Cross reacquired the Station of Santo André, to a private company, thus reclaiming its ownership 107 years after it had lost it. This Station takes the form of a small chapel built into a section of the 14th-century Fernandine Wall, on the birthplace of Saint John de Britto. It corresponds to the procession's sixth stop, where the faithful contemplate Simon of Cyrene helping Jesus carrying the Cross.

The recovery of the Station of Santo André was an old ambition of the Brotherhood, who had lost its ownership in a judicial battle with the building's owner in 1912. The building had many different owners since that date, until it finally became under the possession of the Lisbon City Council; in 2014, the city council decided to sell the building but not before determining in a Municipal Assembly meeting that the Royal Brotherhood was to keep usufruct of the small chapel.

The Station of Santo André was restored and reunveiled on 8 March 2020 by Cardinal Manuel Clemente, Patriarch of Lisbon, during the Procession of Our Lord of the Passion. The Station was restored in full and was furnished with a painting commissioned to João de Sousa Araújo.
