= Walls of Lisbon =

Walls around the capital of Portugal

- Lisbon, Portugal

Site information
- Type: Walls

Location
- Coordinates: 38.7137°N 9.1355°W
- Height: up to 15 m (49 ft)

Site history
- Built: 1st-4th, 8-10th, 11th, 14th centuries
- Built by: Romans, Moorish rulers, D. Dinis, D. Fernando I
- Materials: rammed earth, aggregate, limestone blocks
- Battles/wars: Second Crusade

Garrison information
- Designations: National Monument of Portugal

The walls of Lisbon are a series of three nested defensive stone-wall complexes built at different times to defend Lisbon. They consist of the São Jorge Castle proper and its walls (the Cidadela or Citadel) the Cerca Moura (or Cerca Velha) (lit. the Moorish Walls), its lateral extension the Muralha de D. Dinis (King Denis's wall), and the Cerca Fernandina (Ferdinand's wall).

While the castle walls are essentially intact, the remaining walls are only visible in fragments embedded in buildings and open spaces in contemporary Lisbon.

== History ==
=== Cidadela ===
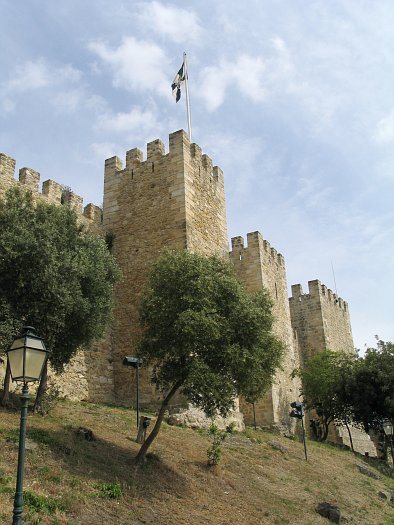
West side of castle within cidadela wall.

Cidadela

The first fortifications comprising the castle date from the 1st century BC. Walls that included the castle site were possibly built around the Roman municipality of Lisbon when it was established in 48 BC. Following the Roman era, the Suebi and the Visigoths also used the cidadela.

=== Cerca Moura ===
Cerca moura and gates

During Lisbon's Moorish era the castle and its walled settlement existed by the 10th century and were reinforced in the 11th century during the Taifa Iberian kingdoms when it was menaced by both Christian and Islamic forces.

Historic descriptions of Lisbon by Arabic geographers name some of the gates in its walls: Bab al-Hawha (Porta da Alfôfa), Bab al-Bahr (Porta do Mar), Bab al-Hamma (Porta de Alfama)—giving Alfama its name, Bab al-Maqbara (Porta do Sol) and Bab al-Madiq (Porta Conde de Linhares).

In 1147, King Afonso I, during the Second Crusade, ejected the Moors from Lisbon. The city repulsed further attacks by Moorish forces in subsequent decades.

=== Muralha de D. Dinis ===
Muralha D. Diniz and gates

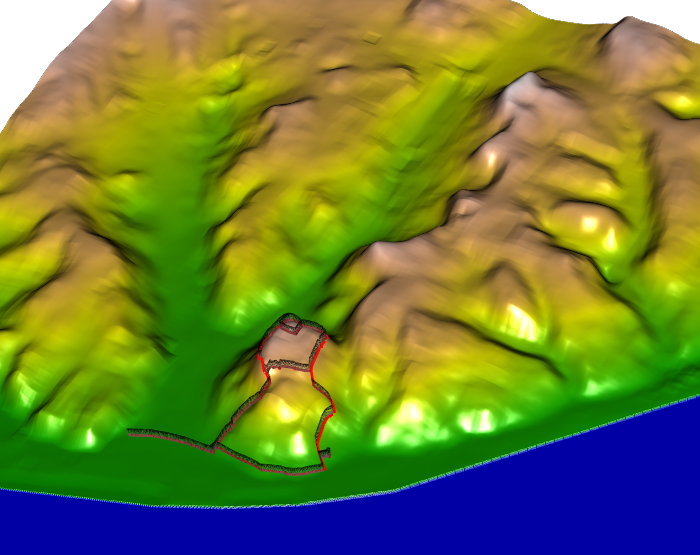
Muralha D. Diniz closed off the Baixa lowland

In 1294, King Denis of Portugal built a westward extension along the Tagus estuary radiating from the southwesternmost corner of the Cerca Moura. Construction took less than a year.

Probably built to protect the expanding Lisbon's shoreline commerce from piracy, it did not enclose any sector of Lisbon but barricaded the low-lying parts of what is now the Baixa.

The 1755 earthquake destroyed the above ground sections of the wall, but excavations under the Banco de Portugal revealed its extensive foundations, now open to public view.

=== Cerca Fernandina ===
Cerca fernandina and gates

Two centuries after Afonso I's reign, Ferdinand I became involved in a succession dispute with Castile. In the mid-14th century, Lisbon endured attacks by Castilian armies that degraded its defenses.

In 1373 Ferdinand I ordered the walls to be strengthened and enlarged. This work included similar construction around the kingdom's other nearby coastal towns: Almada, Sesimbra, Palmela, (Note: Not actually coastal, but royal decree lists as such.) Setúbal, Coina, Benavente—essentially all of the Tagus region's population.

The inland communities of Sintra, Cascais, (Note: Not actually inland, but royal decree lists as such.) Torres Vedras, Mafra, Alenquer, Arruda, Atouguia, Lourinhã, Cheleiros, Póvos, Vila-Franca and Aldeia Galega were also concurrently fortified.

In Lisbon, the wall was completed in 1375, in a rather astonishing two-year period.

=== Unbuilt extensions ===
King John III considered building a moat-enclosed wall around Lisbon in the 16th century connecting the Alcântara drainage to the west (spanned by the aqueduct) with the Rio de Sacavém (now Rio Trancão) to the east. The project was never started.

Between 1650–1652 King John IV wanted to expand Lisbon's fortifications in a more limited way. The plan was to extend the Cerca Fernandina from S. Roque northwest towards Rato, veering northeast around Saldanha and Alameda, thence back to N. S. do Monte in Graça and finally downward to the banks of the Tagus at Santa Apolonia but was never realized.

== Characteristics ==
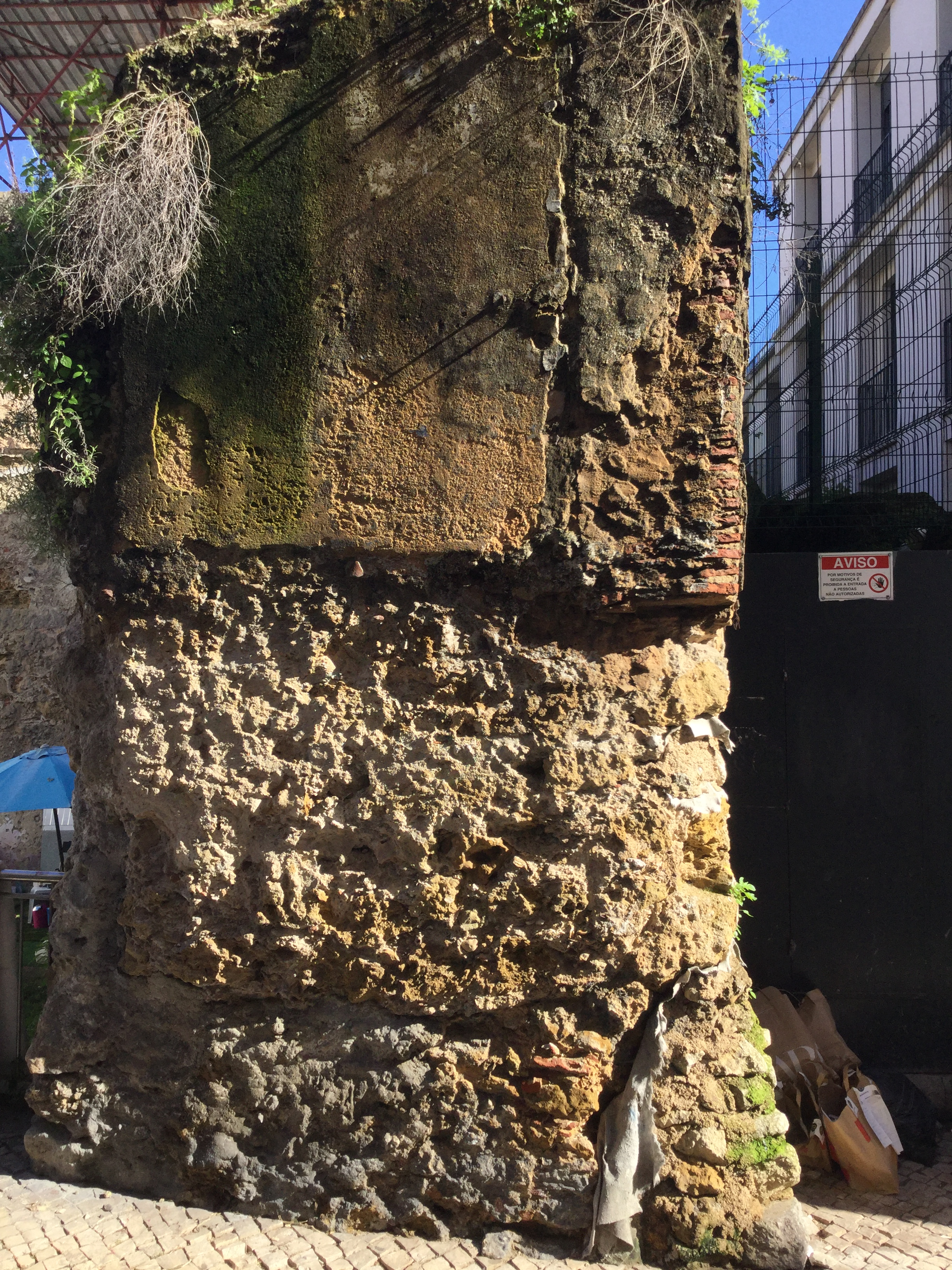
Cerca Fernandina fragment at the Porte do jogo da Péla site showing rammed earth construction.

=== Cerca Moura ===
Generally 2–2.5 m thick, the wall extends from the southern flank of the cidadela for a distance of 1250 m. Including the cidadela, it encloses 15.6 hectares (39 acres).

=== Muralha de D. Diniz ===
This lateral extension of the Cerca Moura runs for about 700 m parallel to the historic estuarine banks. The wall's base was up to 2.7 m wide and around 1.5 m wide above ground. Construction materials were locally sourced limestone for the foundation and cemented aggregate above ground, similar to the Cerca Fernandina.

=== Cerca Fernandina ===
The Cerca Fernandina consists of two parts extending to the east and west of the cerca moura. The eastern segment is 1,920 m (6,300 ft) long and the western segment is 2,770 m (9,090 ft) long. The east encloses 26.65 hectares (65.9 acres) and the west encloses 61.27 hectares (151.4 acres). Towers in the walls were generally 15 m high in an 8 x 8 m footprint. The more frequent flanking towers (cubelos in Portuguese) protruding from the walls were 5 x 5 m. The wall was generally 8 m high and 175-220 cm wide depending on defensive conditions.

A variable, but generally 6 m wide barbican extended outward from the walls on many of the land-facing sections, ending with a low palisade. An alambor protecting the steeper slopes beneath the belvedere at Graça Convent was unearthed during excavations in 2017.

Construction material varied. Some sections were rammed earth with a dry lime binder, a typical Portuguese military practice. Others were aggregate and mortar, and still others, particularly towers, were mortared masonry. The builders used materials locally at hand but that yielded a uniformly strong structure.

An army engineer estimates around 86,000 cubic meters of material was required to build the cerca fernandina.

== Gallery ==
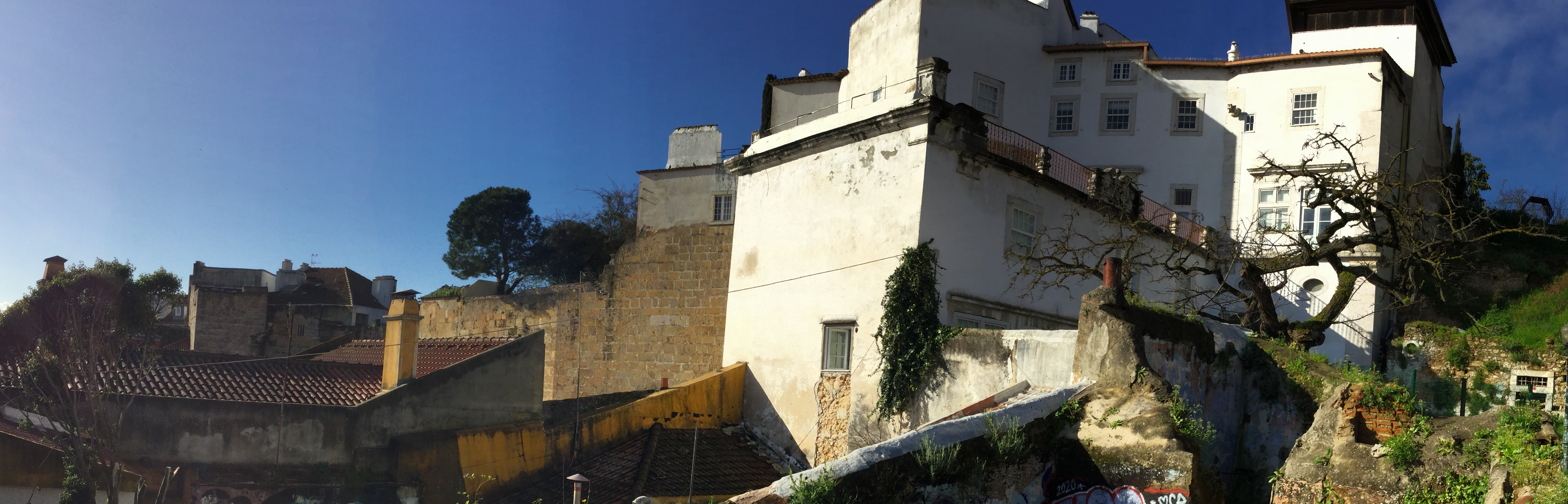
Fragmental cerca moura section at the east junction with cidadela wall. The white tower (right), ochre wall section (left center), and tower on the skyline (left) are standing remnants.

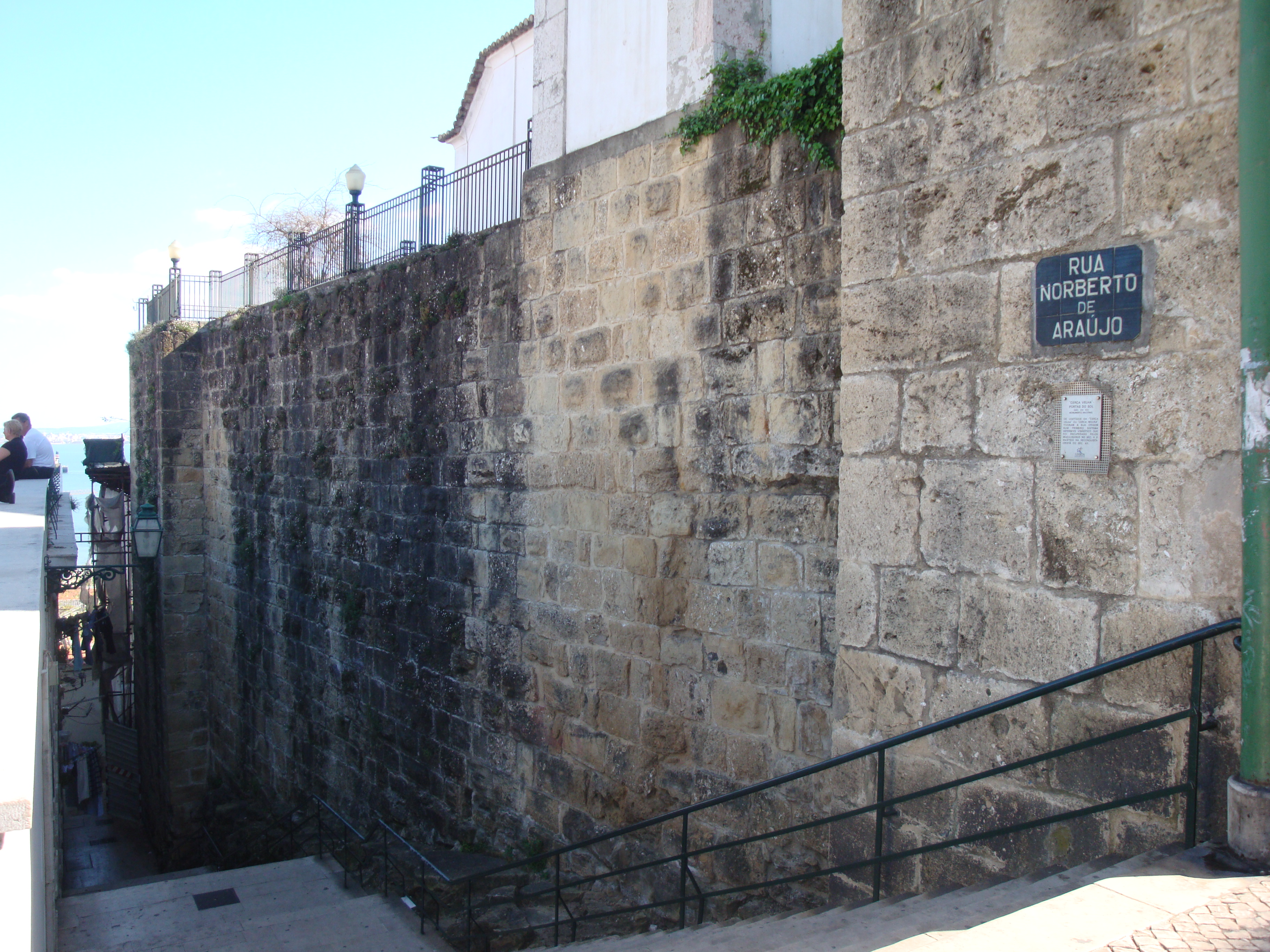
Cerca moura leading downhill from former Porta do Sol.

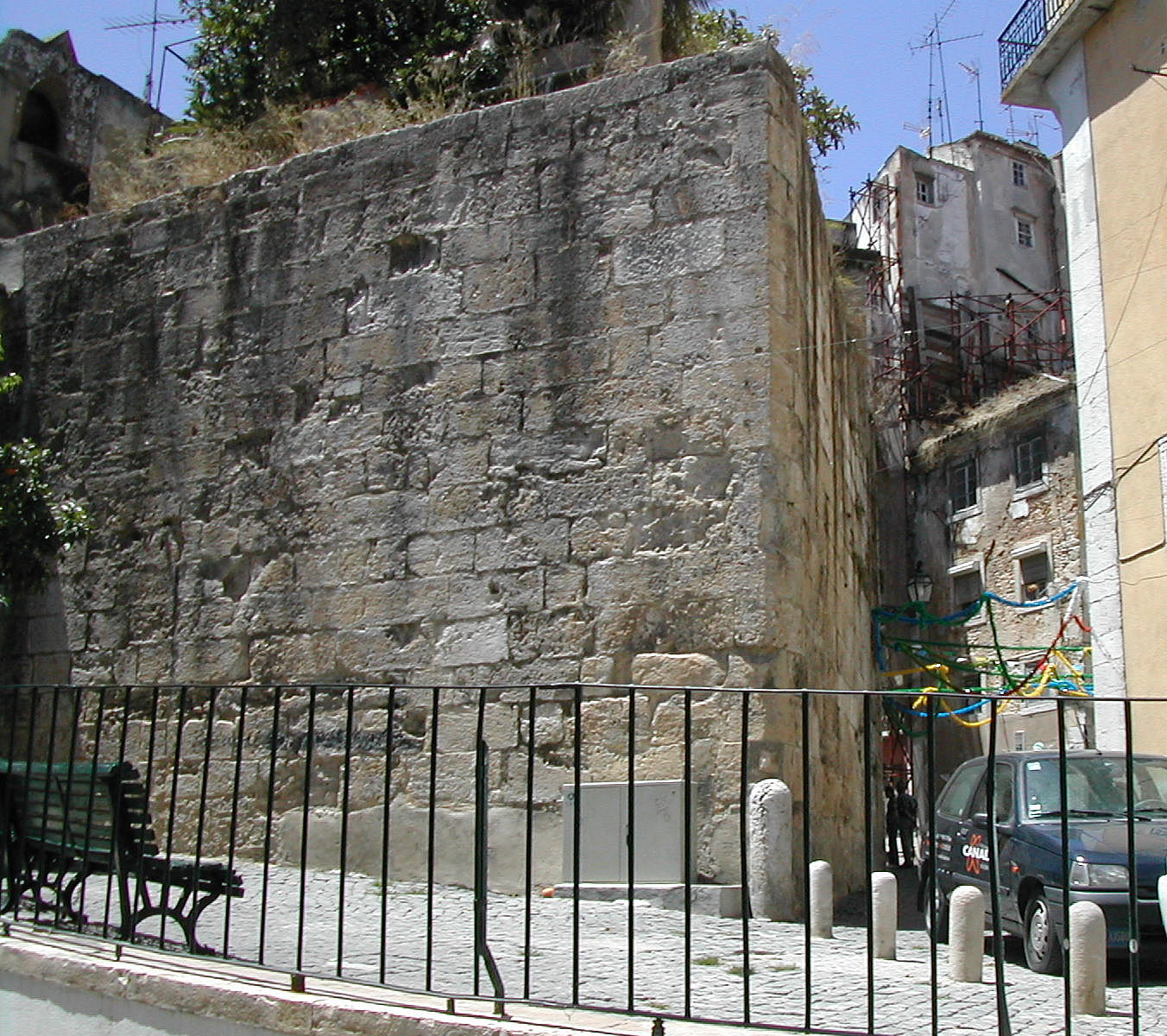
Torre de Alfama.

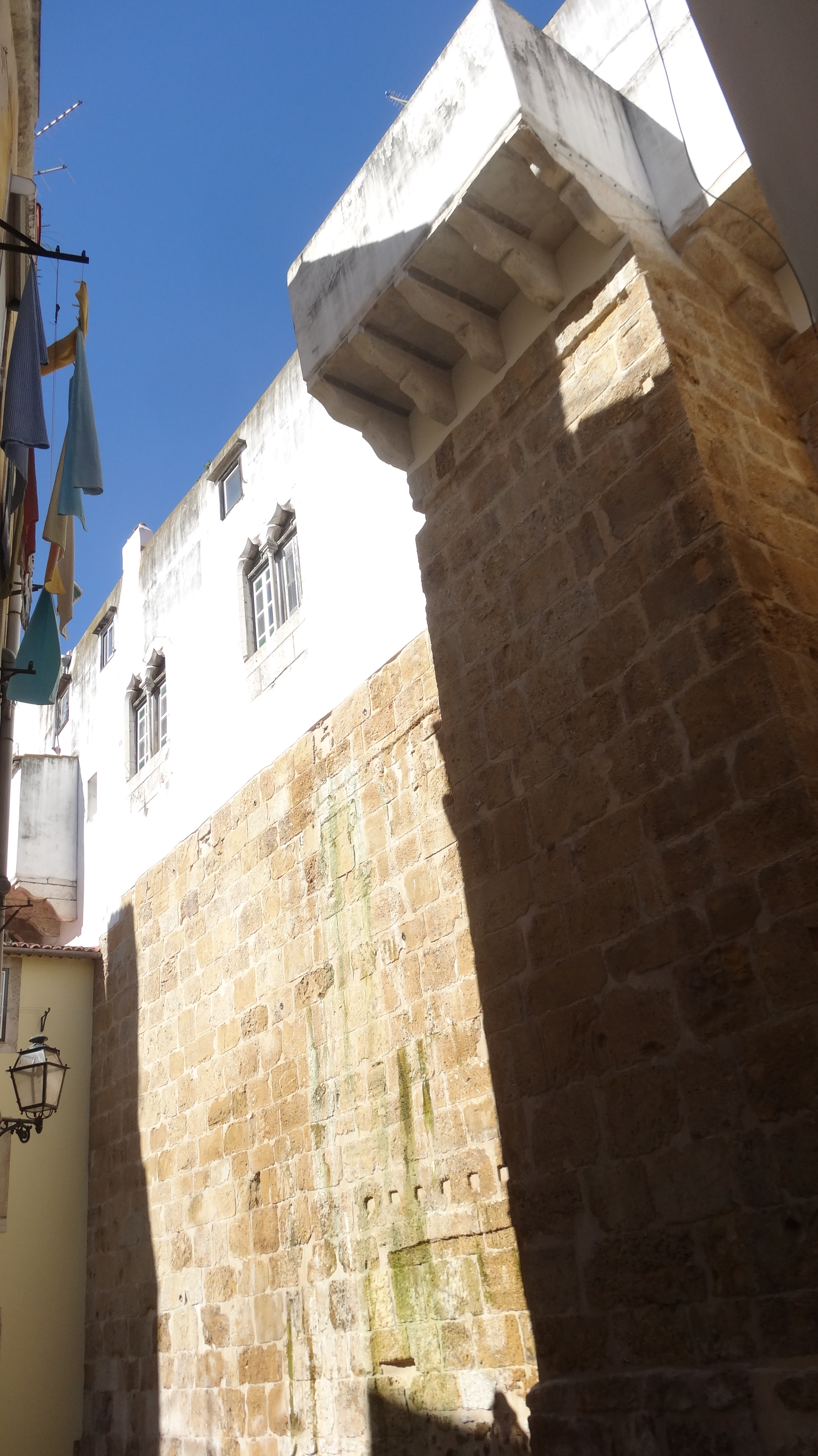
Cerca moura between Porta de Alfama and Torre de Alfama.

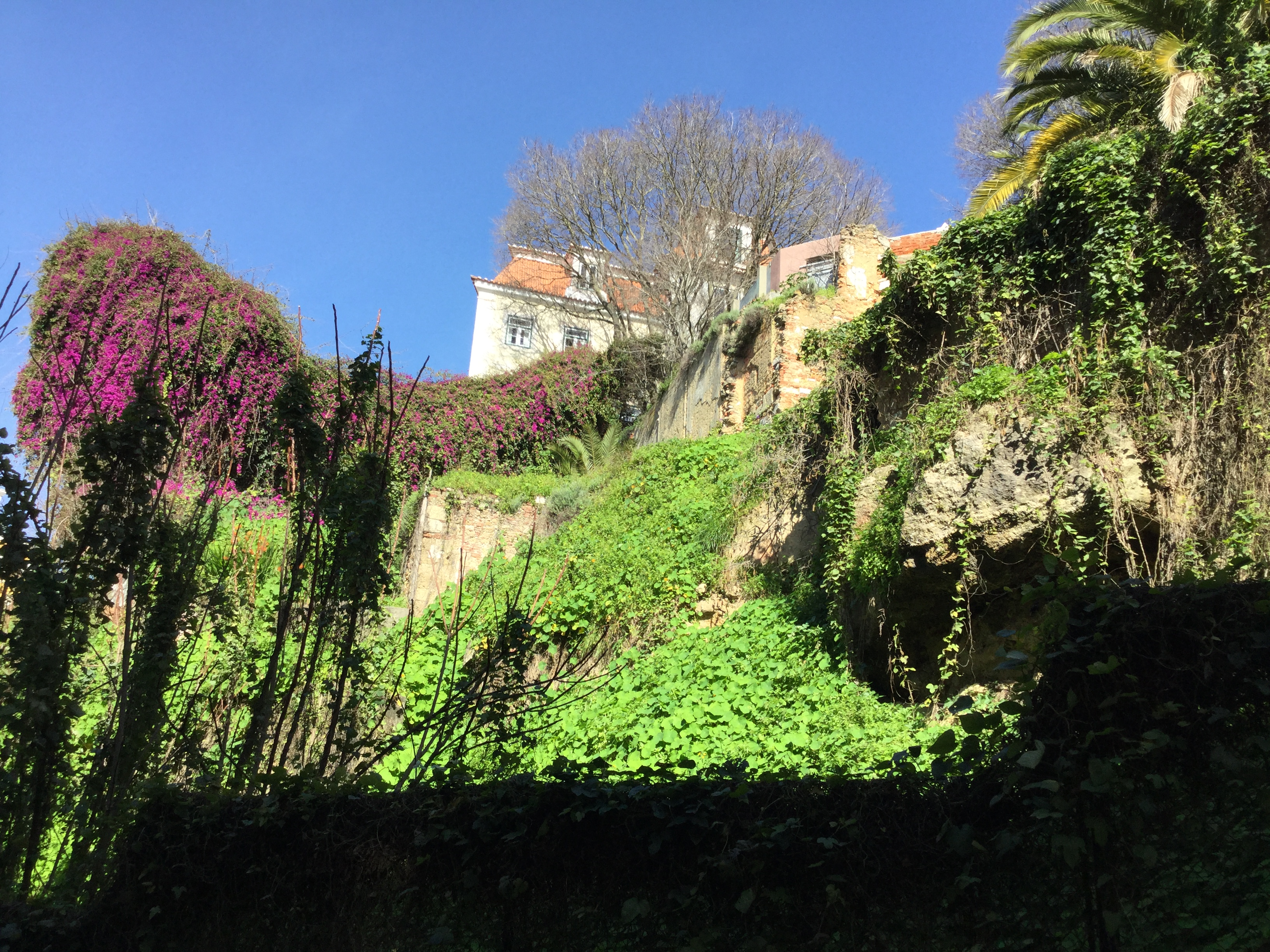
Ruined cerca moura fragment at angle between Porta de Alfôfa and Porta do Ferro.

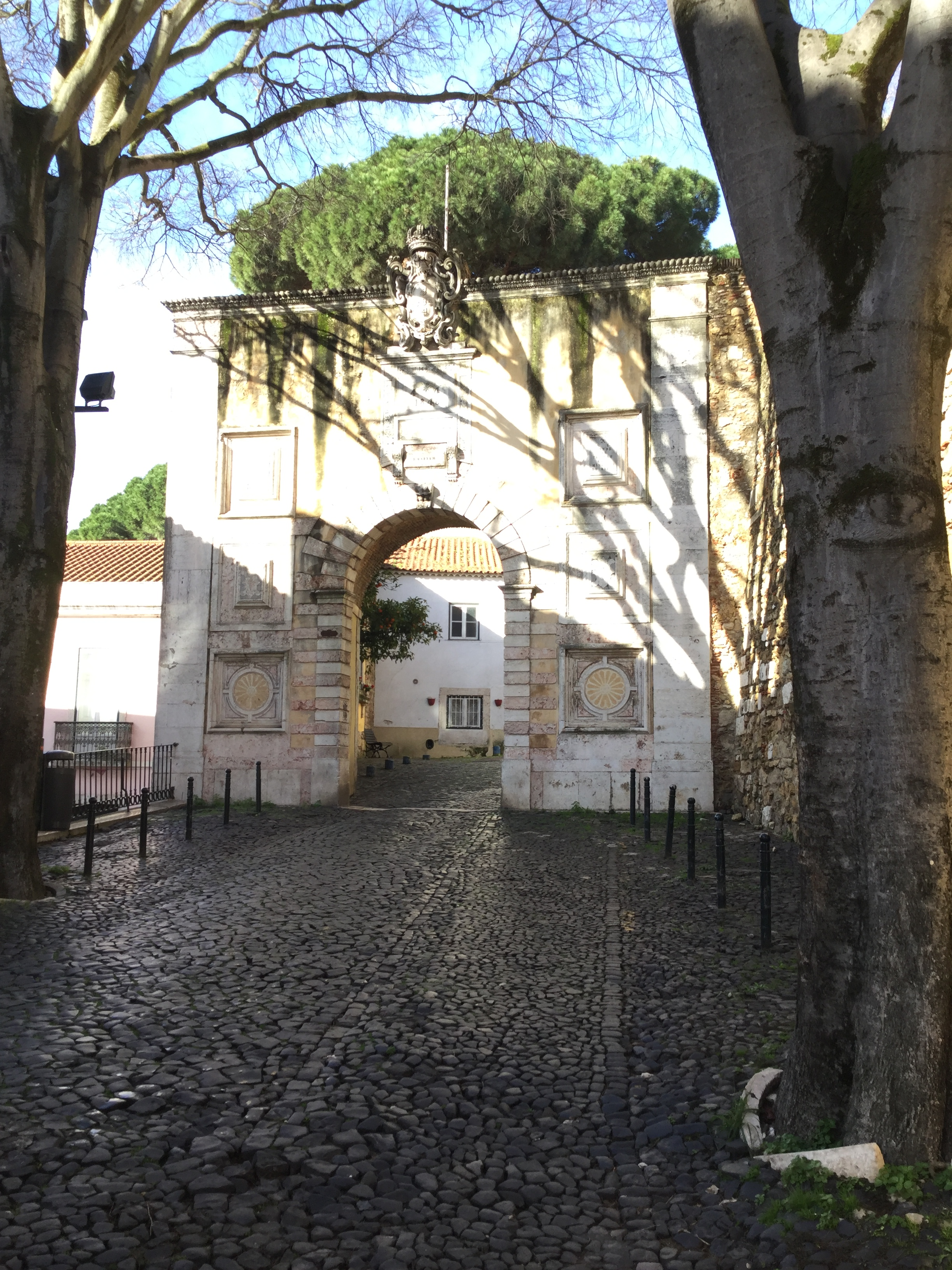
Porta de Alcáçova or de São Jorge, the main cidadela gate.

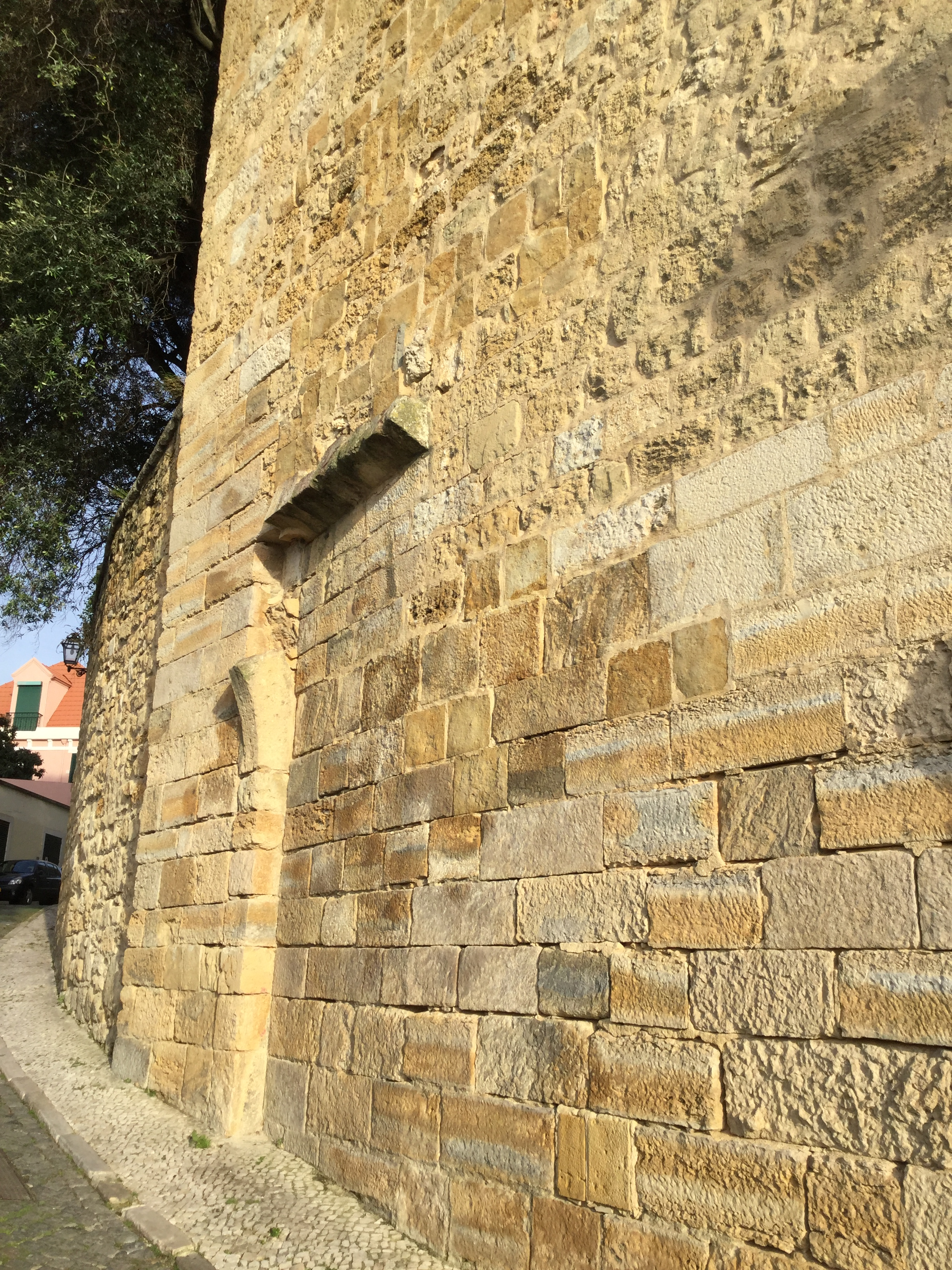
Torre de S. Lourenço, looking out through former gate from inside cerca fernandina.

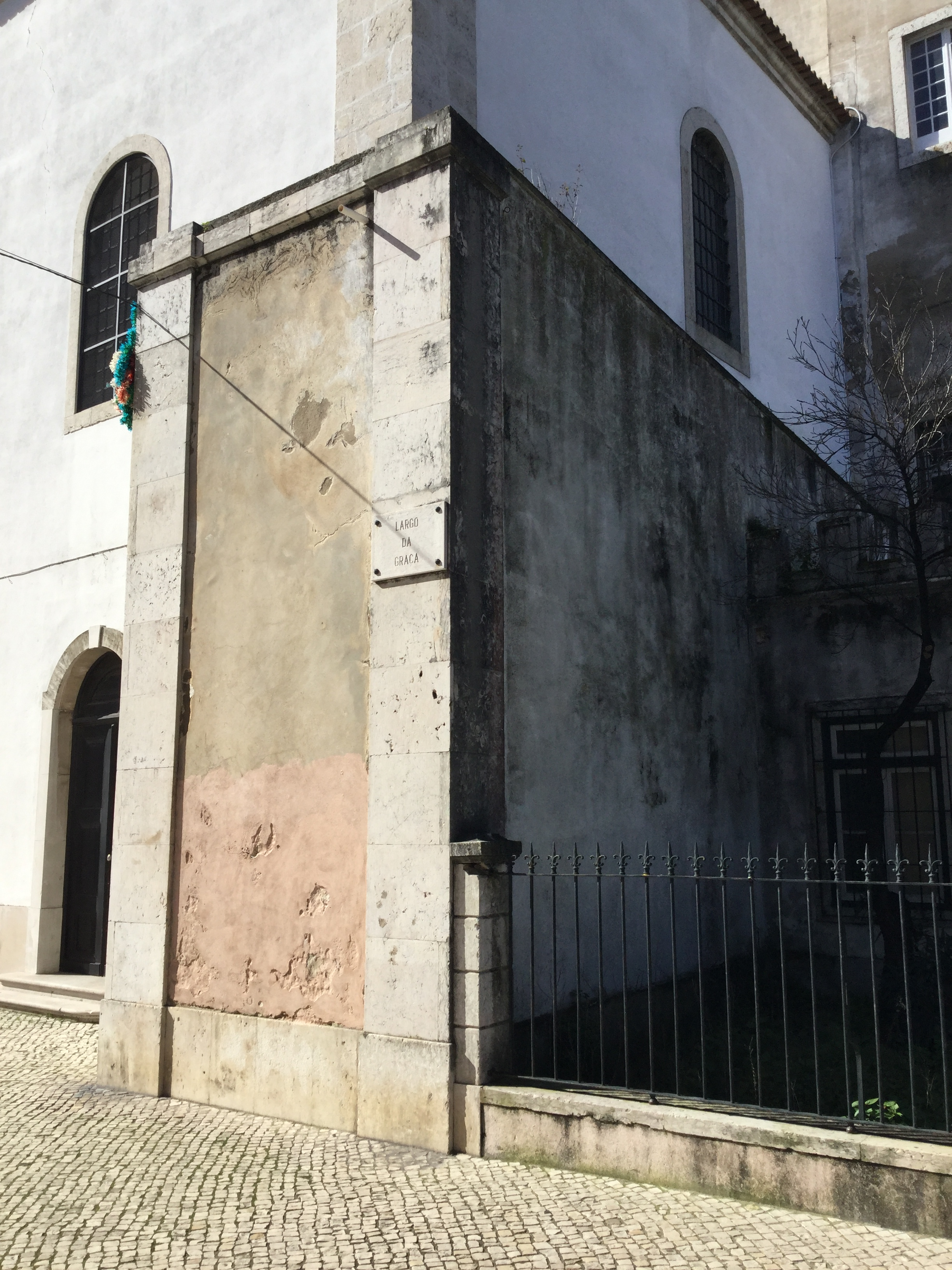
Section of cerca fernandina embedded in wall of Graça convent, at the site of Porta da Graça, looking into enclosure.

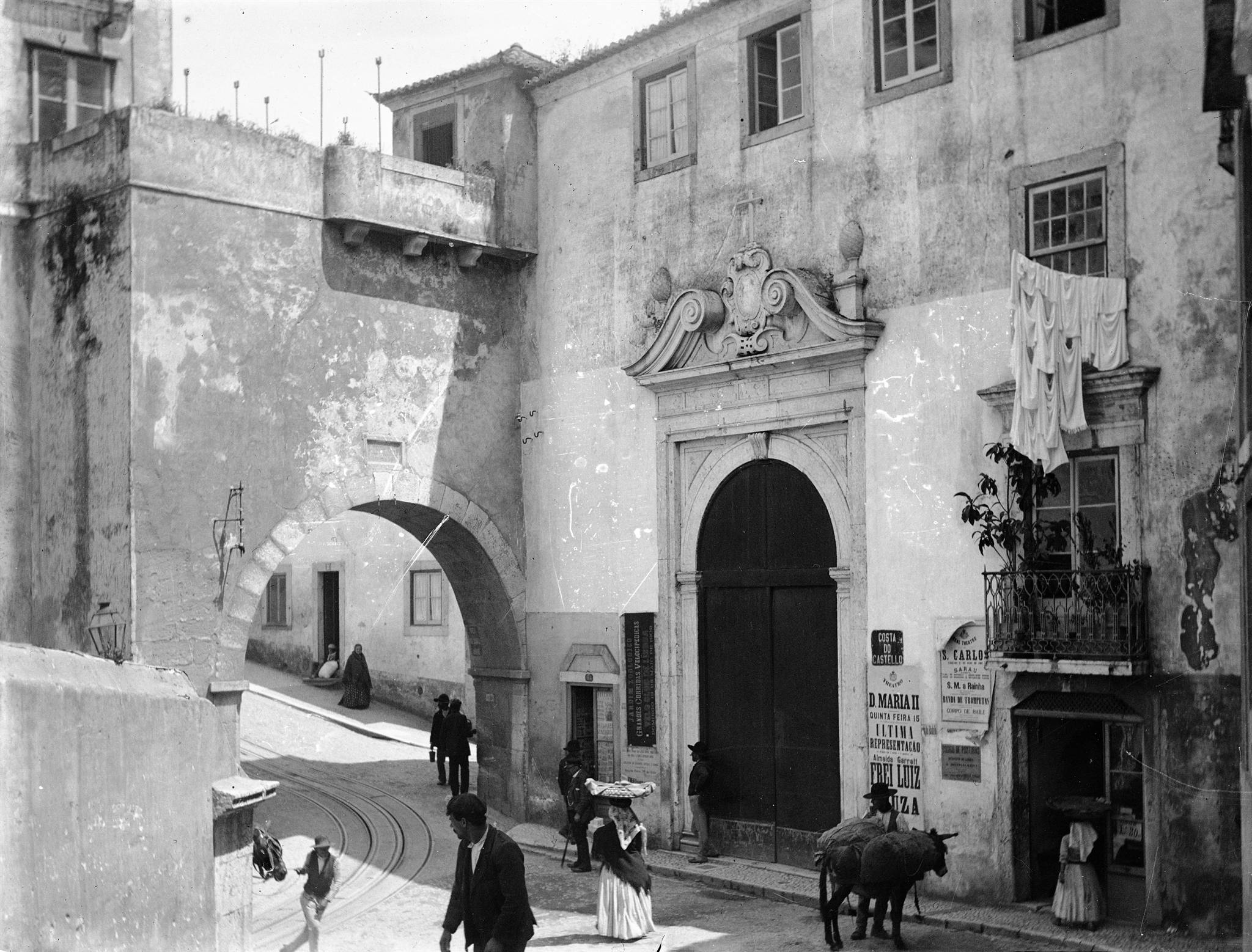
Porta de Santo André outside of cerca fernandina in 1909, looking in. The arch was demolished in 1913.
