= Igreja de São Domingos (Lisbon) =

Church in Lisbon, Portugal

Coordinates: 38°42′53.05″N 9°08′18.17″W

Igreja São Domingos
- View of the main façade of the church.

Religion
- Affiliation: Roman Catholic
- Diocese: Lisbon District
- Region: Lisboa Region
- Rite: Latin Rite

Location
- Location: Largo de São Domingos, 1150 Lisboa, Portugal.
- Municipality: Lisbon
- Interactive map of Igreja São Domingos

Architecture
- Style: Baroque
- Groundbreaking: 1241
- Completed: 1748

Church of St. Dominic (Portuguese: Igreja de São Domingos) is a Catholic church in Lisbon, Portugal. It is classified as a National Monument.

The church was dedicated in 1241 and was, at one time, the largest church in Lisbon. Prior to the establishment of the modern Portuguese republic in 1910, the church typically hosted Portuguese royal weddings. Formerly the home of the Inquisition, Jesuit missionary Gabriel Malagrida was famously executed at the church in 1761 after being accused of treason. In 1506, the church and the church square were the scenes of the Lisbon massacre when thousands of New Christians (previously converted Jews) were murdered by the Christian mob.

The church was damaged by the 1531 Lisbon earthquake and almost completely destroyed in the 1755 earthquake. Rebuilding began quickly but wasn't completed until 1807. In 1959 the church was devastated once more when a fire broke out in the building. The fire, which killed two firefighters, took more than six hours to extinguish and completely gutted the church, destroying many important paintings and statues. In 1994 the church reopened. The restoration left many signs of the fire in place.

== Gallery ==
Nave looking toward the main altar

Main altar and chancel

Side altar

Side altar

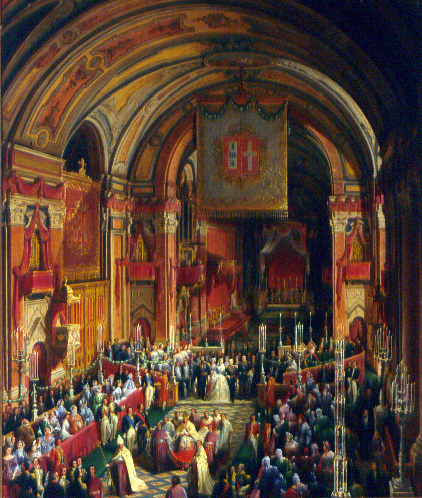
Ratification of the marriage of King Luís I and Maria Pia in 1862, painted by António Manuel da Fonseca in 1864

== See also ==
- Procession of Our Lord of the Passion of Graça
