= Lisbon massacre =

1506 antisemitic riot in the Kingdom of Portugal

- A German woodcut depicting the massacre
- Location: Church of São Domingos, Lisbon, Portugal
- Date: 19–21 April 1506
- Target: Jews
- Deaths: 1,900+

On 19 April 1506, a crowd of churchgoers in Lisbon attacked and killed several people in the congregation whom they suspected were Jews. The violence escalated into a city-wide, antisemitic riot that killed between 500 and 4,000 "New Christians" (Cristãos-Novos), the name for Jews who had been forcibly converted to Christianity.

== Background ==
When King Manuel I took the throne in 1495, he liberalized the status of Jews who had been held in virtual slavery. In 1496, under pressure from the Catholic Monarchs of Spain, he ordered all Jews to either accept baptism or leave the country. King Manuel did not want to lose an important and productive part of the population, so in 1497, before the deadline for their departure, he had all Jews converted by royal decree. This included the native Portuguese Jews as well as a sizeable population of Jews who had fled Spain after the Edict of Expulsion in 1492. In 1499, Manuel forbade the New Christians to leave the country.

The original Christian population resented the recent converts. They were angered by this new source of economic competition and suspected that many of the converts continued to observe the Jewish faith in secret. Despite the king's efforts to maintain the peace, there were occasional outbursts of violence against the New Christians, culminating in the Lisbon massacre in 1506.

== The massacre ==
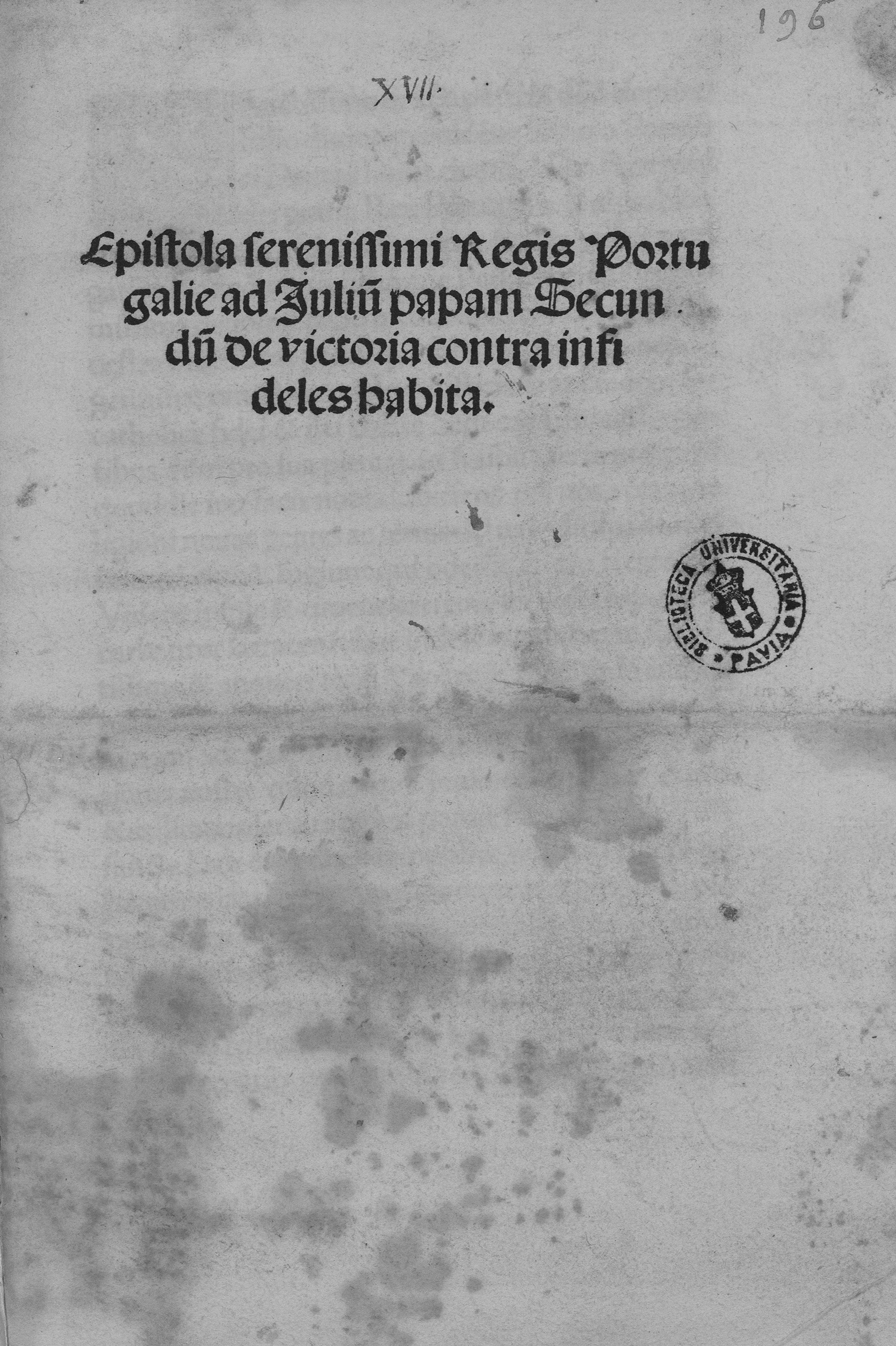
Letter About the "Victory Over the Unbelievers", 1507

The massacre began in the Church of São Domingos on Sunday, 19 April 1506. The faithful were praying for an end to the drought and plague that were sweeping the country when several worshipers claimed they saw a strange light emanating from a crucifix in the Chapel of Jesus. Word of the apparent miracle spread and soon the church was packed with a great crowd that included German and French sailors from trading ships in the harbor. Then a German man came to church with his daughter. The girl had suffered from a crippled or deformed hand from her birth but this abnormality was allegedly miraculously cured.

When a New Christian ridiculed the claims of a miracle, he was attacked and killed by the father of the girl, according to the account by historian Gaspar Correia. Then another man intervened and claimed that the murdered New Christian had been killed because he had spoken the truth. This speaker was also murdered and, following this second murder, the enraged throng sought out and put to death all the New Christians who were to be found in the church. The mob spilled out of the church and began killing any New Christians they came across. They built a pyre on the church square and threw the bodies of their victims into the fire. "They burnt them in the streets of the city for three days on end, till the bodies were consumed and became ashes", according to the eyewitness account of the New Christian Isaac Ibn Farad.

Authorities were unable to subdue the mob and more rioters joined, attracted by the opportunities for looting. Violence spread throughout the city. New Christians, regardless of age or sex, were murdered and their homes looted. Even some Old Christians became victims of the mayhem. By Monday evening the violence seemed to have subsided but Dominican friars from the Monastery of São Domingos organized a procession and urged the crowd to kill the "heretics" and "extinguish the wicked race". The rampage continued until Thursday, when a religious procession calling for peace marched through the city and restored order.

Reports of the numbers killed vary from 500 to more than 4,000. Most were New Christians but Old Christians were also murdered. According to Correia, the victims included significant numbers of Old Christians. At least one important royal official, João Rodrigues Mascarenhas, was killed. Mascarenhas, a New Christian and a tax collector, was undoubtedly a focus of public hatred.

== Aftermath ==
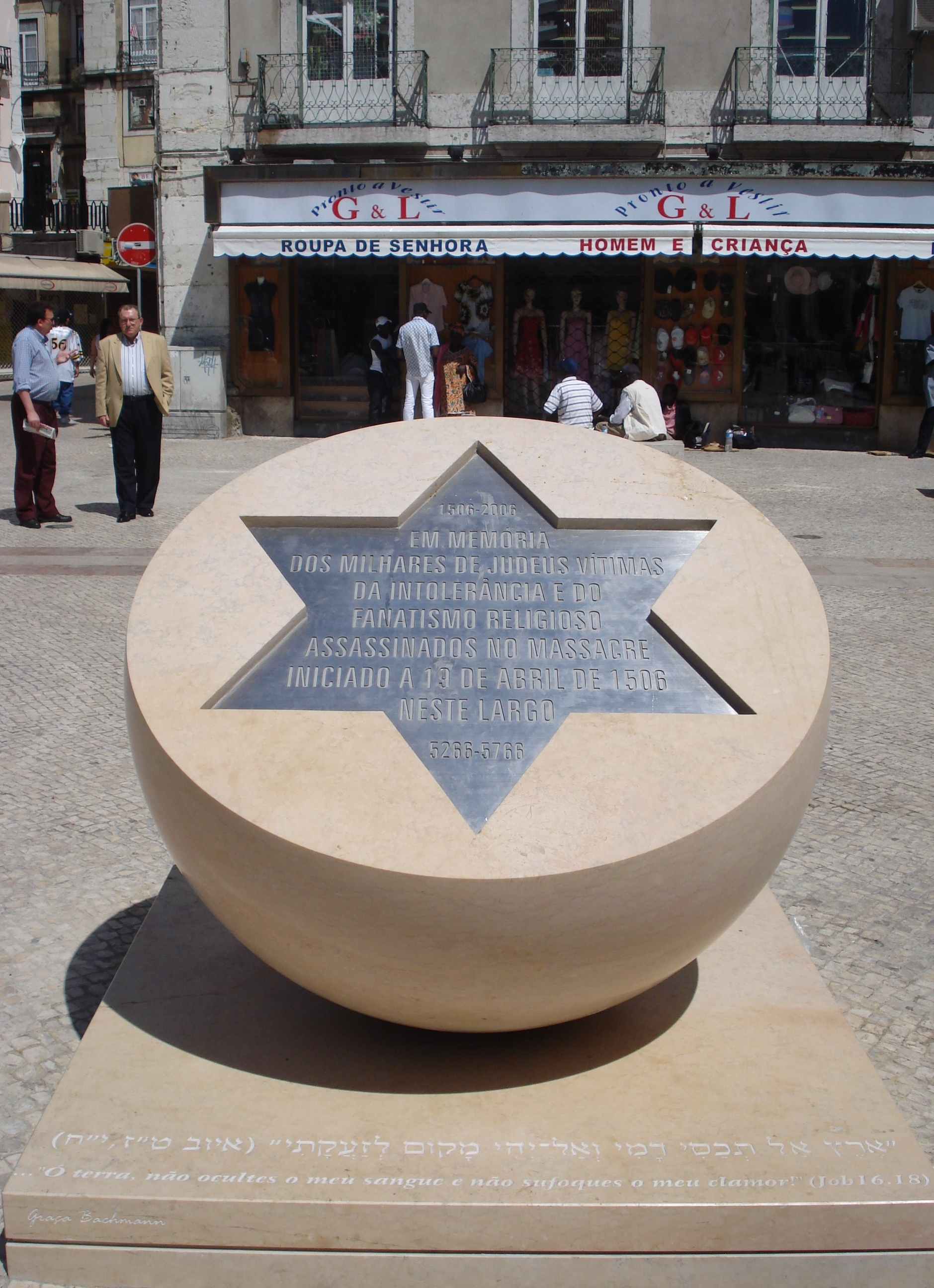
Monument in Lisbon in memory of those lost. It reads: "In memory of the thousands of Jews who were victimed by intolerance and religious fanaticism, killed on the massacre that started on 19 April 1506, on this square". The base has a verse from the Book of Job etched onto it: "O earth, cover not thou my blood, and let my cry have no place."

The king and the court had earlier left Lisbon for Abrantes to escape the plague, and were absent when the massacre began. When King Manuel I was informed of events in Lisbon, he ordered the governor to hurry to the city and "hang all the evildoers responsible for the massacre". For Manuel, the complete breakdown of order was a challenge to his authority and an international embarrassment. It also represented a failure of his efforts to integrate the recently converted Jews into Portuguese society.

The king's retribution was swift and brutal. Participants in the massacre were summarily executed without trial. Two of the Dominican friars who had encouraged the rioters were stripped of their religious orders, strangled, and burnt. Some perpetrators fled the city but were arrested and executed later when they attempted to return. Approximately 500 rioters were executed. The only persons to largely escape justice were the foreign sailors and merchants who returned to the ships with their loot and sailed away.

According to Correia, supposedly many New Christians falsely accused Old Christians who had hidden them during the massacre of having robbed them and the latter were put to death by the Crown's officials.

Manuel also punished the institutions complicit in the massacre. São Domingos Abbey was closed down for eight years and the city of Lisbon lost important privileges, including the expulsion of the city representatives from the Council of the Crown.

Following the massacre, hundreds of New Christians ignored the royal decree forbidding emigration and fled Portugal, while some who remained still felt deep allegiance to the Portuguese monarch. On 1 March 1507, Manuel issued an edict that legalised the emigration of New Christians from Portugal.

The massacre was widely reported in Europe. Several contemporary accounts have survived, including one by Correia, which was discovered at an auction house in the 1970s.

== Bibliography ==
- Marcus, Jacob Rader (2015). "The Massacre of the New Christians of Lisbon: 1506". The Jews in Christian Europe: A Source Book, 315–1791. Hebrew Union College Press. pp. 193–197.
- Rebelo, Luis (2003). "Manuel I, King of Portugal". In Gerli, E. Michael (ed.). Medieval Iberia : an encyclopedia. New York: Routledge. ISBN 0-415-93918-6. OCLC 50404104.
- Soyer, Francois (2007). The Massacre of the New Christians of Lisbon in 1506: A New Eyewitness Account.
- Góis, Damião de (1749). Chronica de el-rei D. Emanuel (vol. II) (in Portuguese).
