= Graça Convent =

Catholic building in Lisbon, Portugal

Coordinates: 38.716988°N 9.13087°W

Graça church.

Graça Convent (Portuguese: Convento da Graça) is one of the oldest convents in Lisbon. It is located in Largo da Graça, in the parish of São Vicente, on Lisbon's highest hill. It faces a belvedere overlooking the city and the Tagus River. It belonged to the Order of Saint Augustine Hermits and at one time served as their headquarters in Portugal.

== History ==
Founded in 1271, at Monte de São Gens, Almofala, the convent was sponsored by Afonso III of Portugal. By 1551 the convent had 13 chapels. On 18 May 1566, the remains of Afonso de Albuquerque were buried in the chapel. Francisco de Saldanha da Gama and Fernando de Sousa e Silva are also buried at Graça.

The convent was rebuilt in the 16th century and restored after the 1755 earthquake and again in the 21st century. It is classified as a National Monument of Portugal.

In 2023, the bell tower of the gatehouse was opened as a viewing platform for paying members of the public. The rooftop terrace is accessible through the convent.

== See also ==
- Procession of Our Lord of the Passion of Graça

== Gallery ==
Church and convent of Graça viewed from Miradouro de Nossa Senhora do Monte

Elevated view of the nave toward the chancel

Chancel

Side chapels

Sacristy with painted ceiling and azulejo panels

Tiled hall known today as the Sala do Capítulo

Cloister
