= José Francisco Miguel António de Mendonça =

Portuguese cardinal

His Eminence José Francisco Miguel António de Mendonça
- Cardinal, Patriarch of Lisbon
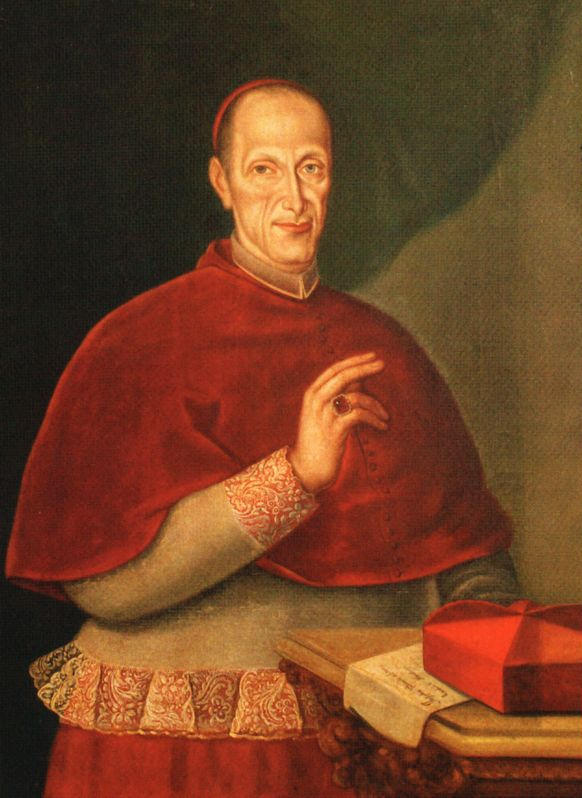
- Church: Roman Catholic Church
- Archdiocese: Lisbon
- See: Cathedral of St. Mary Major
- Installed: 10 March 1788
- Term ended: 11 February 1818
- Predecessor: Fernando de Sousa e Silva
- Successor: Carlos da Cunha e Meneses

Orders
- Ordination: 5 October 1755
- Consecration: 16 November 1788
- Created cardinal: 7 April 1788 by Pius VI

Personal details
- Born: 2 October 1725 Lisbon, Portugal
- Died: 11 February 1808 (aged 82) Lisbon, Portugal

José Francisco Miguel António de Mendonça, or rather, Mendoça (Lisbon, October 2, 1725 - Lisbon, February 11, 1808), was the fifth Patriarch of Lisbon under the name of D. José II.

== Biography ==
He was the son of Nuno Manuel de Mendoça, 4th Count of Vale de Reis, and his wife, D. Leonor Maria Antónia de Noronha. He was the younger brother of the 5th Count and 1st Count of Azambuja, and of D. João Rafael de Mendonça, Bishop of Porto.

He graduated in canon law, having been canon of the Patriarchal See of Lisbon, Monsignor and still principal of the same church.

José Mendonca succeeded D. Francisco de Lemos as rector of the University of Coimbra from 1780 to 1785. During his tenure he attempted introduce a number of reforms.

In 1786, he was appointed Patriarch of Lisbon. By 1792 he was still trying to get permission from the Real Mesa Censória (Royal Censorial Court) to publish two pastoral letters. A law passed on April 5, 1768 reaffirmed the right of "temporal sovereignty" over the prohibition of "pernicious books and papers" in the interest of political defense. As the Mesa had jurisdiction over all printed materials, this included pastoral letters.

Pope Pius VI made him a cardinal in 1788. He died in 1808 and his body is buried in the Convent of Grace.
