= Francisco de Saldanha da Gama =

Portuguese Catholic cardinal (1723–1776)

His Eminence Francisco de Saldanha da Gama
- Cardinal, Patriarch of Lisbon
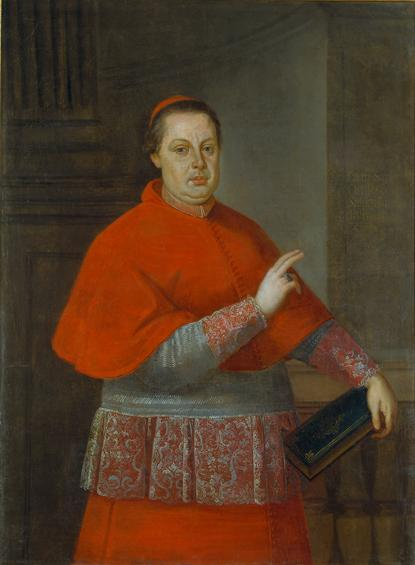
- In office: 1758-1776
- Predecessor: José Manuel da Câmara de Atalaia
- Successor: Fernando de Sousa e Silva

Orders
- Ordination: 1739
- Consecration: 5 August 1759 by José Dantas Barbosa
- Created cardinal: 5 April 1756 by Benedict XIV
- Rank: Cardinal-Priest

Personal details
- Born: Francisco de Saldanha da Gama; 20 May 1723 Lisbon, Portugal
- Died: 1 November 1776 (aged 53) Lisbon, Portugal
- Denomination: Roman Catholic

D. Francisco I de Saldanha da Gama (20 May 1723 – 1 November 1776) was the third Cardinal Patriarch of Lisbon.

== Life ==
He was the great-grandson of Margarida de Vilhena and a descendant of the first viscount of Vila Nova de Cerveira, Leonel de Lima. His father was João de Saldanha da Gama (1674–1752), forty-first viceroy of India. He studied canon law at Coimbra and was ordained to the Priesthood in 1739. He was created Cardinal by Pope Benedict XIV in 1756 at the request of Joseph I of Portugal. He was named Patriarch of Lisbon on 25 July 1758 and was consecrated to the Episcopate on 5 August 1759.

On 1 April 1758, a brief was obtained from the aged Pope Benedict XIV, appointing Saldanha, recommended by the Marquis of Pombal, to investigate allegations against the Jesuits that had been raised in the name of Joseph I of Portugal.
