= Fernando de Sousa e Silva =

Portuguese cardinal (1712–1786)

His Eminence Fernando de Sousa da Silva
- Cardinal, Patriarch of Lisbon
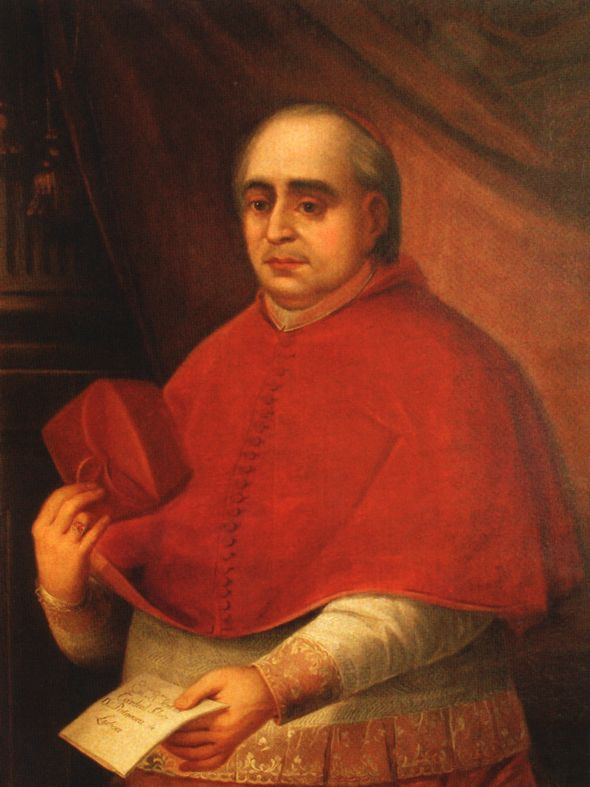
- Church: Roman Catholic Church
- Archdiocese: Lisbon
- See: Cathedral of St. Mary Major
- Installed: 1 March 1779
- Term ended: 11 April 1786
- Predecessor: Francisco de Saldanha da Gama
- Successor: José Francisco Miguel António de Mendonça

Orders
- Ordination: 10 May 1739
- Consecration: 30 May 1779
- Created cardinal: 1 June 1778 by Pius VI

Personal details
- Born: 27 November 1712 Lisbon, Portugal
- Died: 11 April 1786 (aged 73)
- Buried: Church of Belém, Jerónimos Monastery, Lisbon
- Education: University of Coimbra (J.C.D.)

Fernando de Sousa da Silva (27 November 1712 – 11 April 1786) was the fourth Patriarch of Lisbon, being elected in December 1776, and consecrated on 30 May 1779. He was elevated to the cardinalate by Pope Pius VI in the secret consistory held on 1 January 1778.

== Biography ==
He was born in Lisbon, the son of Aleixo de Sousa da Silva e Menezes, 2nd Count of Santiago de Beduído, and his wife D. Leonor Maria de Menezes, and brother of the 3rd and 4th Counts. He was a direct descendant of Vasco da Gama, Francisco de Portugal, 3rd Count of Vimioso, D. Afonso, Count of Ourém, and therefore also the first Duke of Braganza, D. Afonso. His studies took place at the University of Coimbra, where he graduated with a degree in Canon law. Further receiving the insignia of clerical character on 13 April 1721, the Minor Orders on 17 September 1734 and the diaconia on 20 December 1738.

=== Ecclesiastical career ===
Ordained priest on 1 May 1739, he was appointed Primarius principalis of the Patriarchate of Lisbon on 31 July 1755. Thereafter appointed chaplain-vicar of Lisbon on 1 November 1776. He situated his residence in the Palace of Junqueira, in Lisbon.

He was created cardinal in the consistory of 1 June 1778, the Pope sending the cardinal's cap with Mons. Francesco Serlupi, as he never ventured to Rome to receive his cap and respective title. He was named Patriarch of Lisbon by Queen Maria on 14 August 1778., and on 1 March 1779, he received his pallium. In a pastoral letter on 2 April, he confessed his reluctance to accept the appointment and the uneasiness that plagued him in his perception that it would be useless to refuse.

His appointment was consecrated on 30 May 1779, in the chapel of the Palace of Junqueira. His solemn entry into the city was made the following June. He died on 11 April 1786, at 7 o'clock, of apoplexy in Lisbon and was buried alongside his predecessor, Cardinal Francisco de Saldanha da Gama, in the Jerónimos Monastery in Lisbon.
