= List of freguesias of Portugal: I =

The freguesias (civil parishes) of Portugal are listed in by municipality according to the following format:

- concelho
  - freguesias

== Idanha-a-Nova ==
- Alcafozes
- Aldeia de Santa Margarida
- Idanha-a-Nova
- Idanha-a-Velha
- Ladoeiro
- Medelim
- Monfortinho
- Monsanto
- Oledo
- Penha Garcia
- Proença-a-Velha
- Rosmaninhal
- Salvaterra do Extremo
- São Miguel de Acha
- Segura
- Toulões
- Zebreira

== Ílhavo ==
- Gafanha da Encarnação
- Gafanha da Nazaré
- Gafanha do Carmo
- Ílhavo (São Salvador)
