= Termas de Monfortinho =

- Civil parish
- Location in Portugal
- Coordinates: 39.997°N 6.881°W
- Country: Portugal
- Region: Centro
- Intermunic. comm.: Beira Baixa
- District: Castelo Branco
- Municipality: Idanha-a-Nova

Population (2011)
  - Total: 307
- Time zone: UTC+00:00 (WET)
  - Summer (DST): UTC+01:00 (WEST)

Termas de Monfortinho is a spa town in the municipality of Idanha-a-Nova, Portugal. It is one of the main crossings on the Portugal–Spain border.

Termas has 307 inhabitants (2011) and is about 3 km from the parish headquarters, Monfortinho.

It is served by Monfortinho Airport, an unpaved 840 metres (2,756 ft) airstrip 3 kilometres (2 mi) south of the village.
