= Monfortinho e Salvaterra do Extremo =

- Civil parish
- Location in Portugal
- Coordinates: 40.004°N 6.916°W
- Country: Portugal
- Region: Centro
- Intermunic. comm.: Beira Baixa
- District: Castelo Branco
- Municipality: Idanha-a-Nova

Area
  - Total: 135.39 km^{2} (52.27 sq mi)

Population (2011)
  - Total: 706
  - Density: 5.2/km^{2} (14/sq mi)
- Time zone: UTC+00:00 (WET)
  - Summer (DST): UTC+01:00 (WEST)

Monfortinho e Salvaterra do Extremo is a civil parish in the municipality of Idanha-a-Nova, Portugal. It was formed in 2013 by the merger of the former parishes Monfortinho and Salvaterra do Extremo. The population in 2011 was 706, in an area of 135.39 km^{2}.

== See also ==
- Termas de Monfortinho
