= Alcafozes =

Village in Portugal

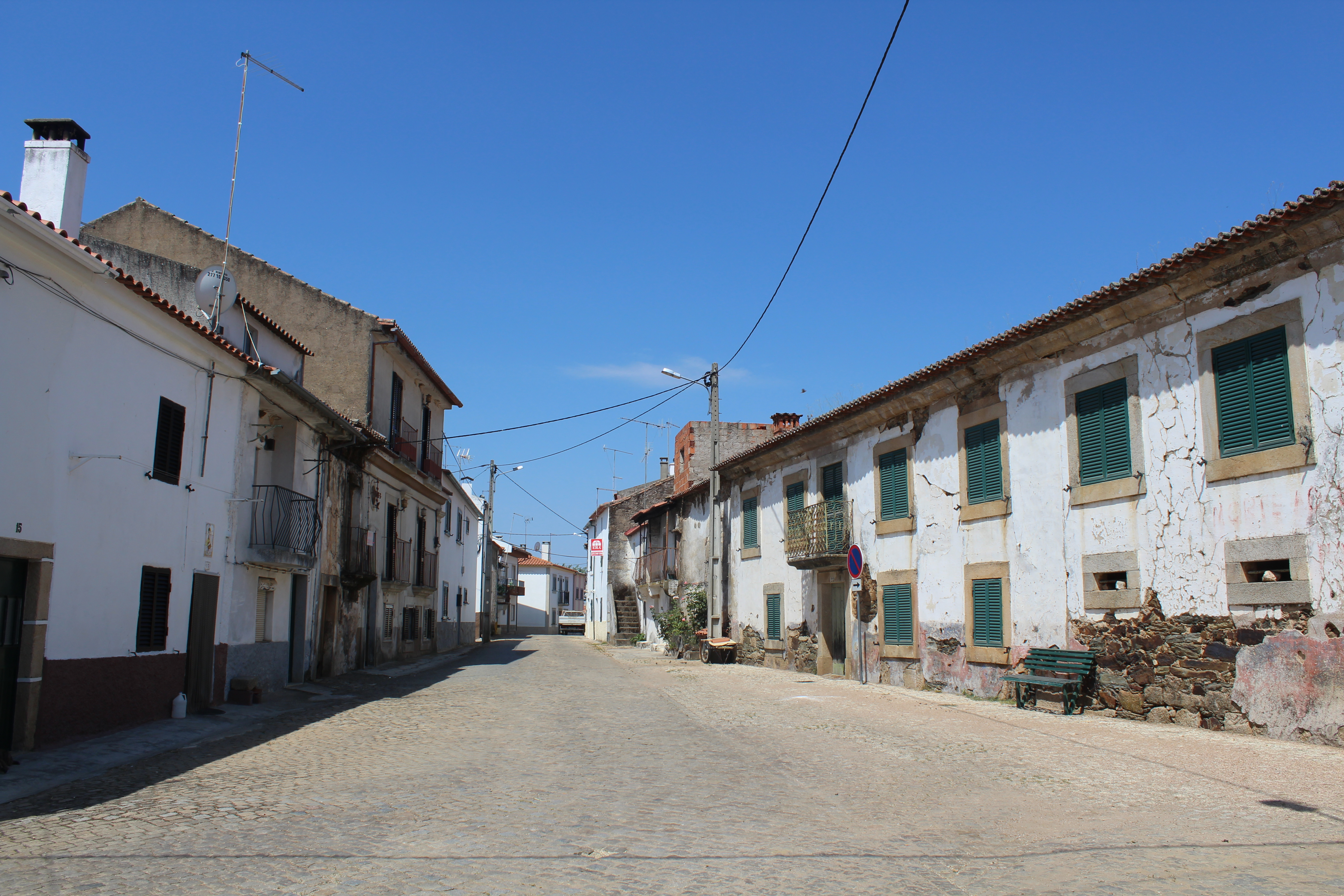
Alcafozes

Alcafozes is a village in the civil parish of Idanha-a-Nova and Alcafozes, municipality of Idanha-a-Nova, Castelo Branco District, in Portugal. In 2011, it had 202 inhabitants in an area of 56,82 km^{2}. Alcafozes is the most important settlement in the immediate vicinity of the internationally renowned music and culture festival Boom Festival. A religious event and folk festival in honor of both airmen and aviation takes place every year in the Our Lady of Loreto Shrine in Alcafozes.

== History ==
The settlement was founded in the year 715 by invading Muslims when they decided to build shelters for their livestock in the area. Its name comes from Arabic for "land of [Moorish] cages". Previously, as in the rest of Portugal, Lusitanians, Romans, Suebi and Visigoths had passed through and settled in the area too. Specially in Idanha-a-Velha (called Egitânia in the past) which is located further north from Alcafozes. Its Misericórdia Church is a building of the late nineteenth century with bell tower on the South side. It has three altarpieces and pulpit, in neo-rococo and neo-neoclassical styles. Nearby is the Cross of San Marcos, consisting of three crosses in granite, an abundant mineral in the entire region. At Easter, there is a play of the Passion of Christ in which the emphasis is given to the biblical character of Veronica, always performed by a local. Veronica was a pious woman of Jerusalem who, moved by the suffering of Jesus to carry the cross, gave him her veil. Jesus accepted the offering and after using it returned it to Veronica. And, as the legend goes, the image of his face was miraculously imprinted on it. In 1810, during the Peninsular War, a battle took place in Alcafozes. In the Our Lady of Loreto Shrine in Alcafozes, a religious event and folk festival in honor of both airmen and aviation happens every year due to Our Lady of Loreto being the patroness of aviators. It is attended by members of the Portuguese Air Force, TAP Air Portugal, air pilots in general and all sort of non-aviation world related people including locals. There is also a gastronomic festival every year, focused on local products like asparagus, Terfezia arenaria and Tricholoma equestre. Until 2013, Alcafozes was its own civil parish (freguesia in Portuguese) but it merged with the neighboring civil parish of Idanha-a-Nova in order to form the newly created civil parish of Idanha-a-Nova and Alcafozes. Until 1933, Idanha-a-Velha was part of the former civil parish of Alcafozes. About 7 kilometers to the north of the village, still in the civil parish of Idanha-a-Nova and Alcafozes, are the premises of the international music and culture festival Boom Festival which has taken place on the banks of Marechal Carmona Dam (built in 1946) reservoir every other year since 1997.

== Geography ==
Alcafozes belongs since 2013 to the civil parish of Idanha-a-Nova e Alcafozes when its own civil parish was merged into the civil parish of the seat of the municipality, the town of Idanha-a-Nova. In 2011, the now extinct civil parish of Alcafozes had 202 inhabitants in an area of 56,82 km^{2}. By road, Alcafozes is about 15 kilometers away from the seat of the municipality (referred to as concelho in Portuguese), the town of Idanha-a-Nova located to the west of Alcafozes, and 48 kilometers away from the district capital, the city of Castelo Branco located even further to the west of the village. About 15 kilometers away from Alcafozes, to the south, is the town of Zebreira which has about 33% of gypsies, also known as Romani (Portuguese ciganos), among its population. Idanha-a-Velha, ancient Egitânia, to the north, is 7 kilometers from Alcafozes by road.

== See also ==
- Boom Festival
