= Monfortinho =

- Civil parish
- Location in Portugal
- Coordinates: 39.997°N 6.881°W
- Country: Portugal
- Region: Centro
- Intermunic. comm.: Beira Baixa
- District: Castelo Branco
- Municipality: Idanha-a-Nova
- Disbanded: 2013

Area
  - Total: 53.2 km^{2} (20.5 sq mi)

Population (2001)
  - Total: 608
  - Density: 11/km^{2} (30/sq mi)
- Time zone: UTC+00:00 (WET)
  - Summer (DST): UTC+01:00 (WEST)

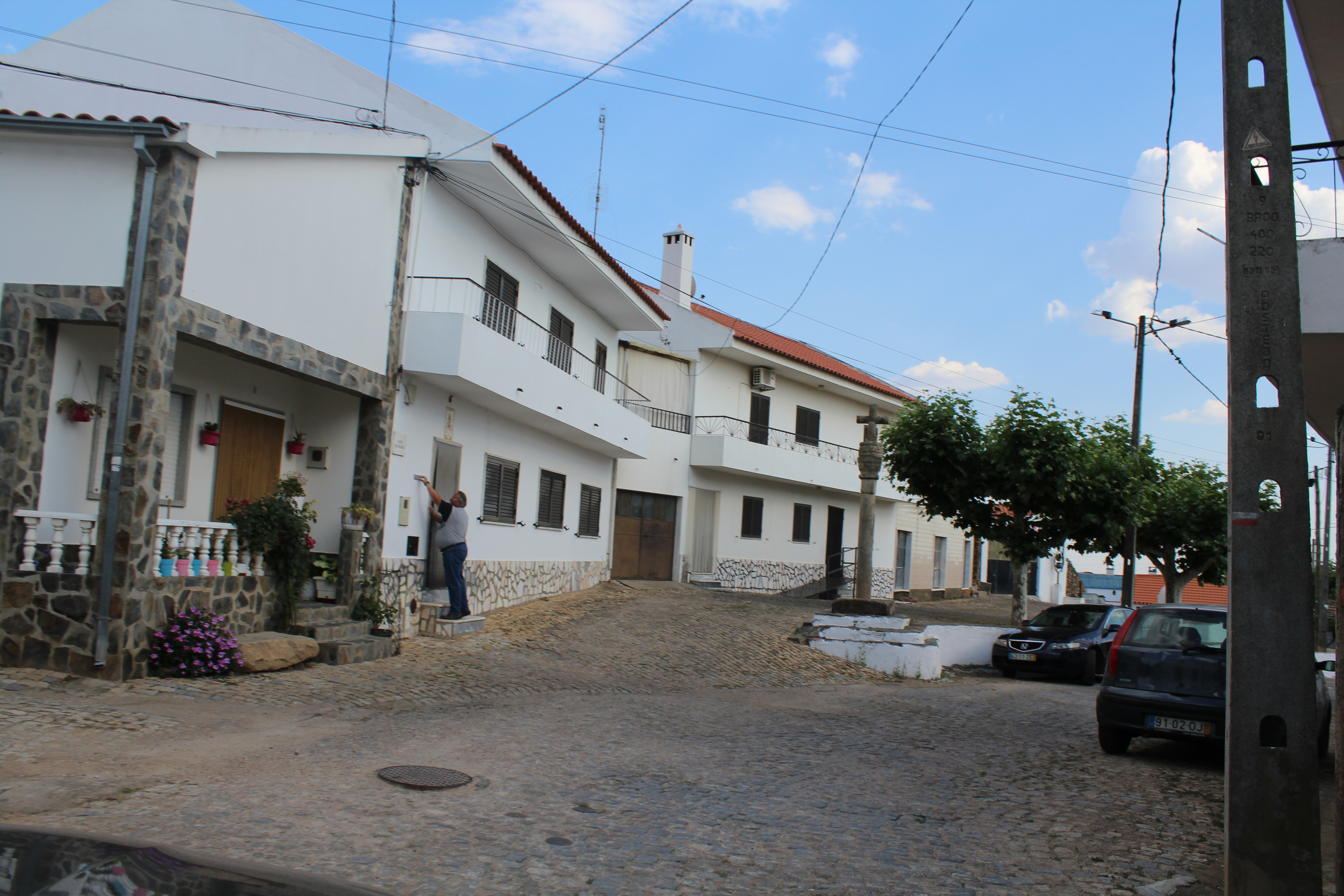
Monfortinho

Monfortinho is a former civil parish in the municipality of Idanha-a-Nova, Portugal. In 2013, the parish merged into the new parish Monfortinho e Salvaterra do Extremo. It covers an area of 53.2 km^{2} and had a population of 608 as of 2001.

It is served by Monfortinho Airport, an unpaved 840 metres (2,756 ft) airstrip 3 kilometres (2 mi) south of the village.
