= Boleo (disambiguation) =

Boleo is a figure in Argentine tango

Boleo or Boléo may also refer to:

- El Boleo, a mine for copper and other minerals near Santa Rosalia, Mexico
- Compagnie du Boléo, a French company that developed the El Boleo mine
- Manuel de Paiva Boléo (1904-1992), a Portuguese professor of philology and linguistics.
