= Aldeia de Santa Margarida =

- Civil parish
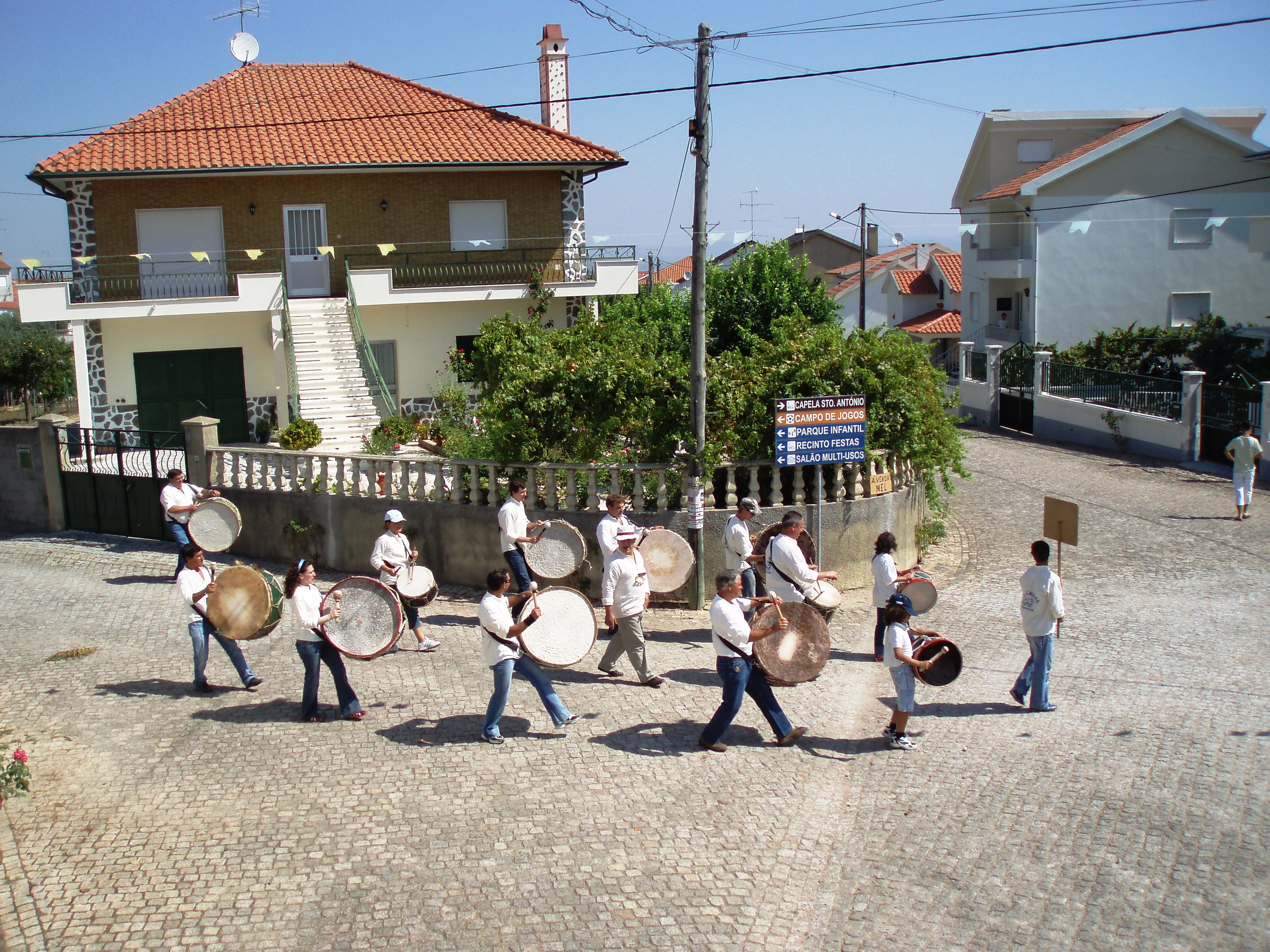
- Arruada dos Zabumbas, bombos de Alpedrinha

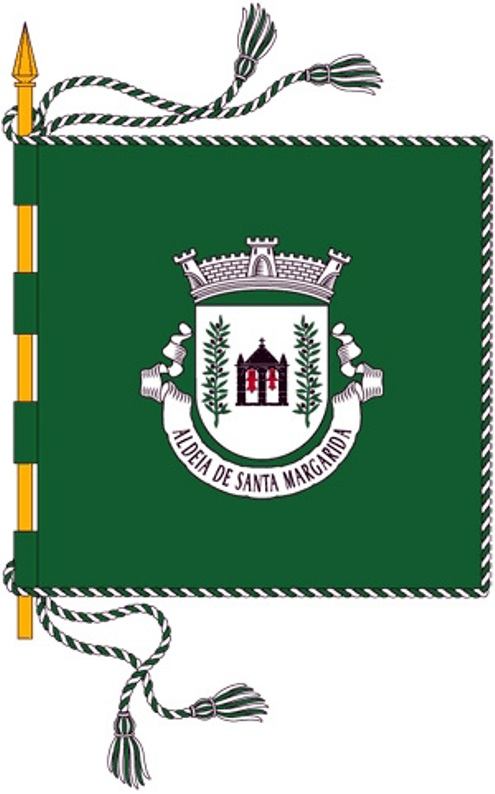
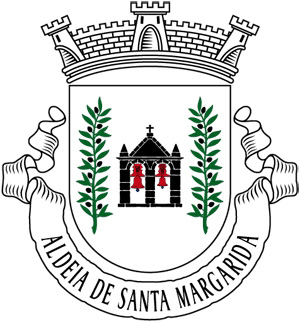
- Flag Coat of arms

- Location in Portugal
- Coordinates: 40.064°N 7.276°W
- Country: Portugal
- Region: Centro
- Intermunic. comm.: Beira Baixa
- District: Castelo Branco
- Municipality: Idanha-a-Nova
- Established: 1218

Area
  - Total: 13.62 km^{2} (5.26 sq mi)

Population (2011)
  - Total: 292
  - Density: 21.4/km^{2} (55.5/sq mi)
- Time zone: UTC+00:00 (WET)
  - Summer (DST): UTC+01:00 (WEST)

Aldeia de Santa Margarida is a parish (freguesia) in the municipality of Idanha-a-Nova in Portugal. The population in 2011 was 292, in an area of 13.62 km^{2}.
