= Amador of Portugal =

Saint Amador

Hermit
- Born: unknown Monsanto (Idanha-a-Nova), Castelo Branco district, Portugal
- Died: unknown São Pedro de Vir-a-Corça, Monsanto, Portugal
- Venerated in: Roman Catholic Church; Eastern Orthodox Church
- Feast: 27 March

Amador of Portugal or of Guarda (unknown dates of birth and death during the middle ages) was a hermit from Portugal. He was venerated as a saint by the Catholic Church and his feast day is celebrated on 27 March.

== Life ==
No historical information concerning Amador has survived. Traditionally, he is believed to have been a hermit, born in Monsanto on the edge of the Diocese of Guarda, who withdrew to the hermitage of São Pedro de Vir-a-Corça, where he lived for many years. After his death the chapel of the hermitage became a place of pilgrimage. Several churches and chapels are dedicated to him.

== Legend ==
In the absence of historical evidence, there is a detailed legend, recorded in the following form in 1652:
Amador was a hermit of São Pedro de Vir-a-Corça in Monsanto, so called because of his kindness (Amador: "lover" or "embodiment of love"). In the vicinity lived a woman of very bad temper who was reputed to fight with everyone who nevertheless was known to visit Amador, bringing him bread and fresh water. Despite her constant arguing and bad temper, Amador did not waver from his loving kindness toward her. One day the woman went far away, returning with a small child, her son. Amador asked her to allow him to baptize the child, but the woman objected, shouting at the boy saying that he was a crybaby and would never have any friends - if only the demons would take him. According to the legend, a group of demons then appeared and indeed took the child, lifting it into the air. At the same time the ground opened and swallowed the woman.

Amador prayed with such faith to save the child that the demons were forced to release it, and the child fell to his feet unharmed. The hermit asked for help from God to raise it, and God sent him a female deer every day who nourished the child with her milk. The child, growing up under Amador's care, became a monastic in the same tradition, and helped Amador as he aged. One day it was revealed that the father of the young monk had died and was suffering in purgatory, and Amador advised the young man to say Mass and to pray for his father's salvation. At some point soon after, Amador received a revelation that the prayers had been answered and the father's soul had been admitted to paradise. The younger monk continued to attend Amador and to praise his holiness and love until Amador's death and burial. The younger monk continued taking care of the chapel, following his master's way of life, and when he died was buried with Amador beneath the chapel altar.

The chapel became a place of pilgrimage and miracles were attributed to the intercession of the saint, as well as protection against plagues of aphids and lizards in the fields.

== Veneration ==
His feast day is celebrated locally on 27 March. Some churches, particularly in the diocese of Guarda, are dedicated to him.
