= Zebreira =

Town and former civil parish in Portugal

Coordinates: 39°50′41″N 7°04′04″W

Zebreira is a town and the seat of the civil parish of Zebreira e Segura, in the municipality of Idanha-a-Nova, District of Castelo Branco, in Portugal.

== History ==
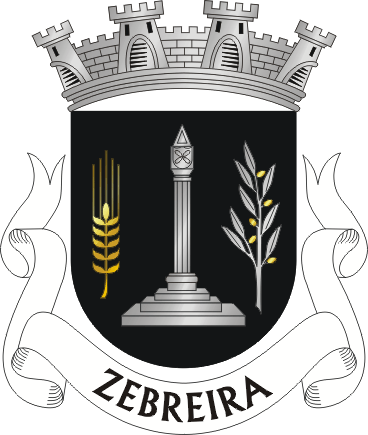
Coat of Arms.

Opinions are divided on the origin of the term Zebreira. Some authors defend that it derives from the word "Zebro" (referring to a wild equid reported living in the Iberian Peninsula during the medieval period), others consider that it is of Egyptian origin, which would mean Santo Monte (Holy Hill). Like other civil parishes in Portugal, in the 12th century it was repopulated by the Order of the Templars during the Reconquista. It became a village and seat of municipality (concelho) with its own justice by then. Within the town, there is the Mother Church (from the 18th century), the chapels (especially the altar of the chapel of Espírito Santo), the pillory of 1686 (whose faces have lions, an armillary sphere, a flower and two arms with a cleaver), and the Town Hall with the bell tower. Close to the Guarda Nacional Republicana garrison, is the primary school with a beautiful tiled facade.

== Geography ==
Zebreira is in a civil parish which is a border civil parish with Spain. The seat of its municipality, the town of Idanha-a-Nova, is about 23 kilometers to northwest by road and the border with Spain is about 13 kilometers from the town center, to the east. The town of Zebreira has about 33% of gypsies, also known as Romani (Portuguese ciganos), among its population. 15 kilometers to the north is the village of Alcafozes.

== Economy ==
The town of Zebreira has the civil parish offices, primary school, CTT post office and Guarda Nacional Republicana garrison. The Zebreira land is very fertile and the cultivation of olive trees, fruit trees and cereals predominates. The economy of the town revolves around agriculture, forestry and animal husbandry.
