= Armindo Monteiro =

Portuguese professor, businessman, diplomat, and politician

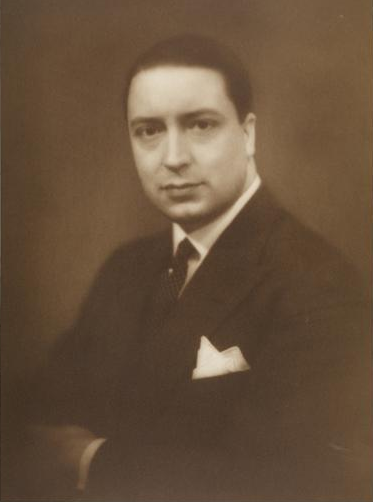

Portuguese ambassador to the United Kingdom
- In office 1937–1943

Minister of Foreign Affairs
- In office 1935–1936

Minister of the Colonies
- In office 1931–1935

Personal details
- Born: 16 December 1896 Vila Velha de Ródão, Portugal
- Died: 15 October 1955 (aged 58) Loures, Portugal
- Occupation: professor, businessman and politician

Armindo Rodrigues de Sttau Monteiro (16 December 1896 – 15 October 1955), known as Armindo Monteiro, was a Portuguese university professor, businessman, diplomat and politician who exercised important functions during the Estado Novo period.

Monteiro was born in Vila Velha de Ródão. He served at the Ministry of the Colonies, the Ministry of Foreign Affairs and as the Portuguese ambassador to the United Kingdom during the first part of the Second World War. He died in Loures, aged 58.
