= Marechal Carmona Dam =

Dam in Castelo Branco, Portugal

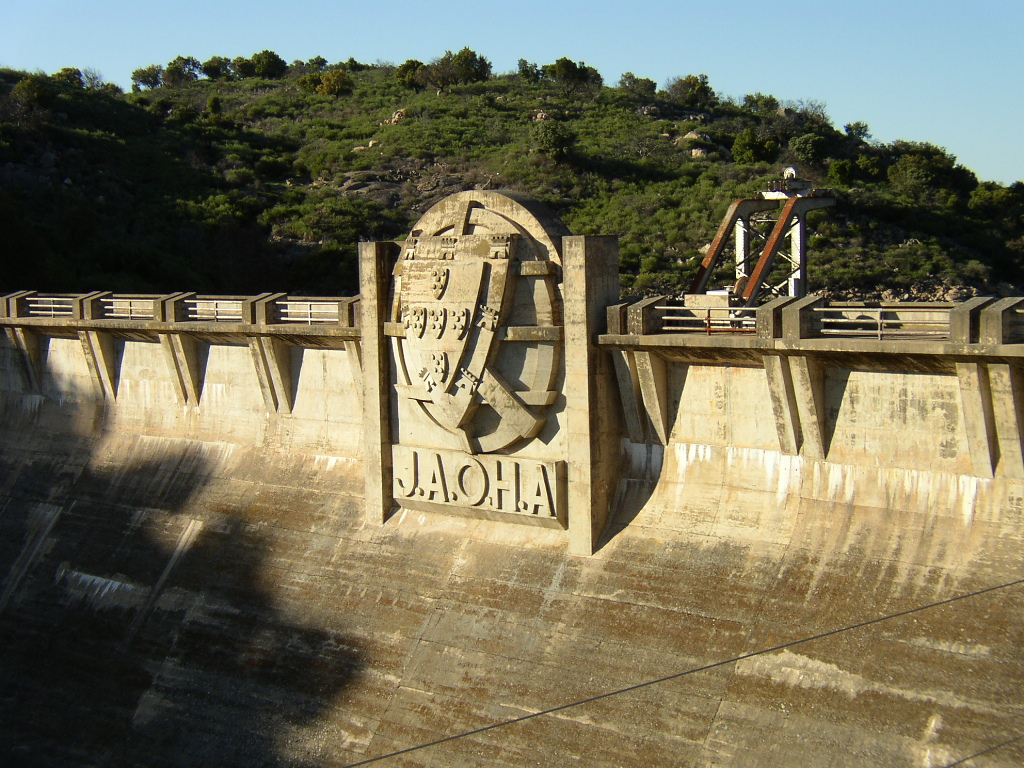
The dam began to fill in 1946 during Estado Novo.

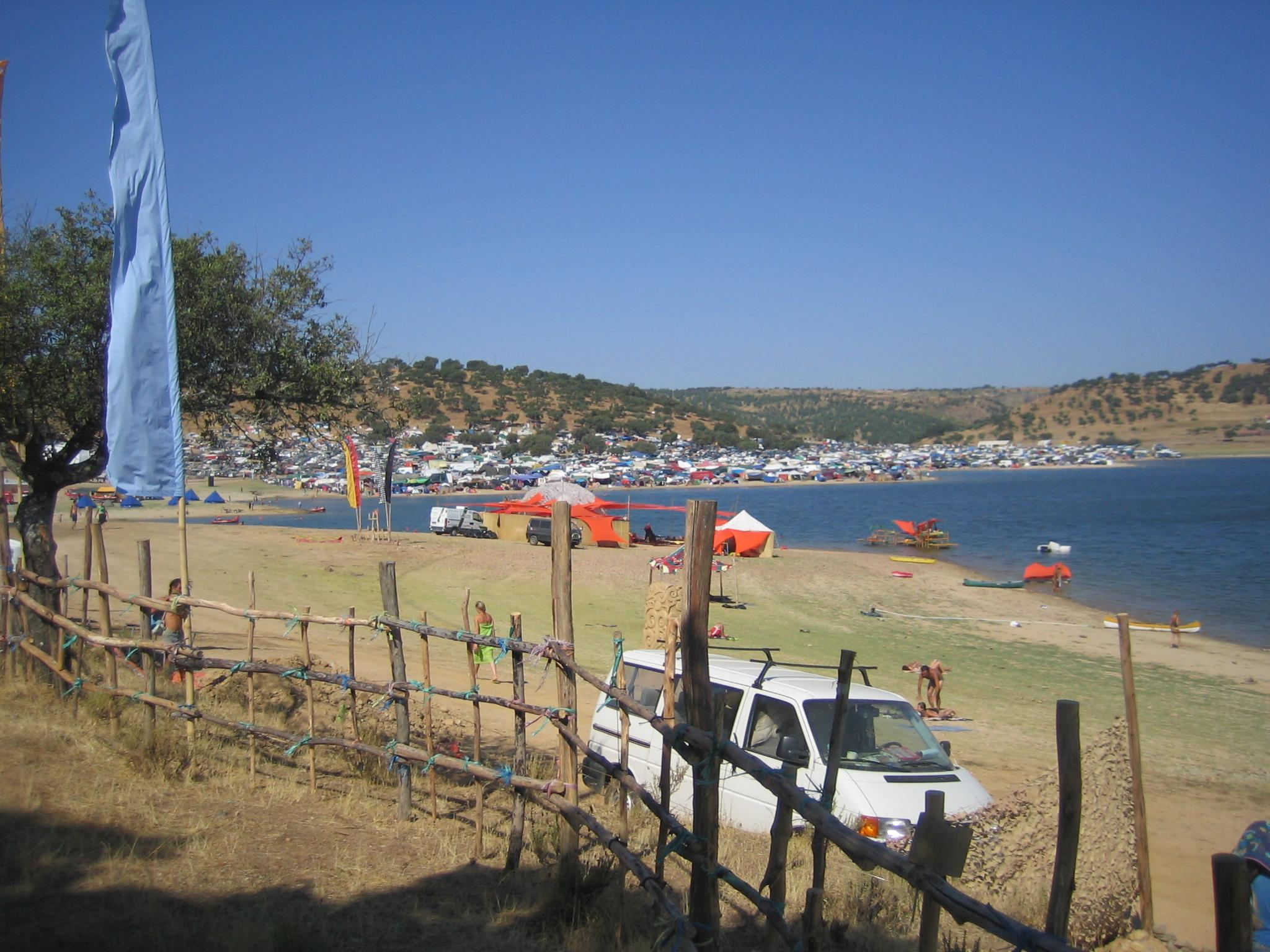
Beach on the banks of Marechal Carmona Dam reservoir where a camping park is located and the Boom Festival takes place.

Marechal Carmona Dam, also known as Idanha Dam, Idanha-a-Nova Lake and Idanha-a-Nova Reservoir, is a dam on the Ponsul River in the municipality of Idanha-a-Nova, District of Castelo Branco, in Portugal. Named after Óscar Carmona, a Portuguese Army officer and politician, it is a gravity type dam located beside a tight granite throat over the Campinas, in Idanha-a-Nova municipality. The dam began to fill in 1946 during Estado Novo. A few kilometres outside the town of Idanha-a-Nova lies this dam which completely transformed the landscape of the valley and separated the two Idanhas – the Nova (New) and the Velha (Old). The reservoir now contains a large artificial lake that is ideal for canoeing and other water sports. In summer, the river beaches are a perfect place to cool off. Sports and leisure activities in its reservoir include fishing, swimming, sailing boats and windsurf. The music and culture festival Boom Festival takes place on its banks every other year.
