= Vila Velha de Ródão =

Municipality in Castelo Branco, Portugal

Vila Velha de Rodão
- Municipality
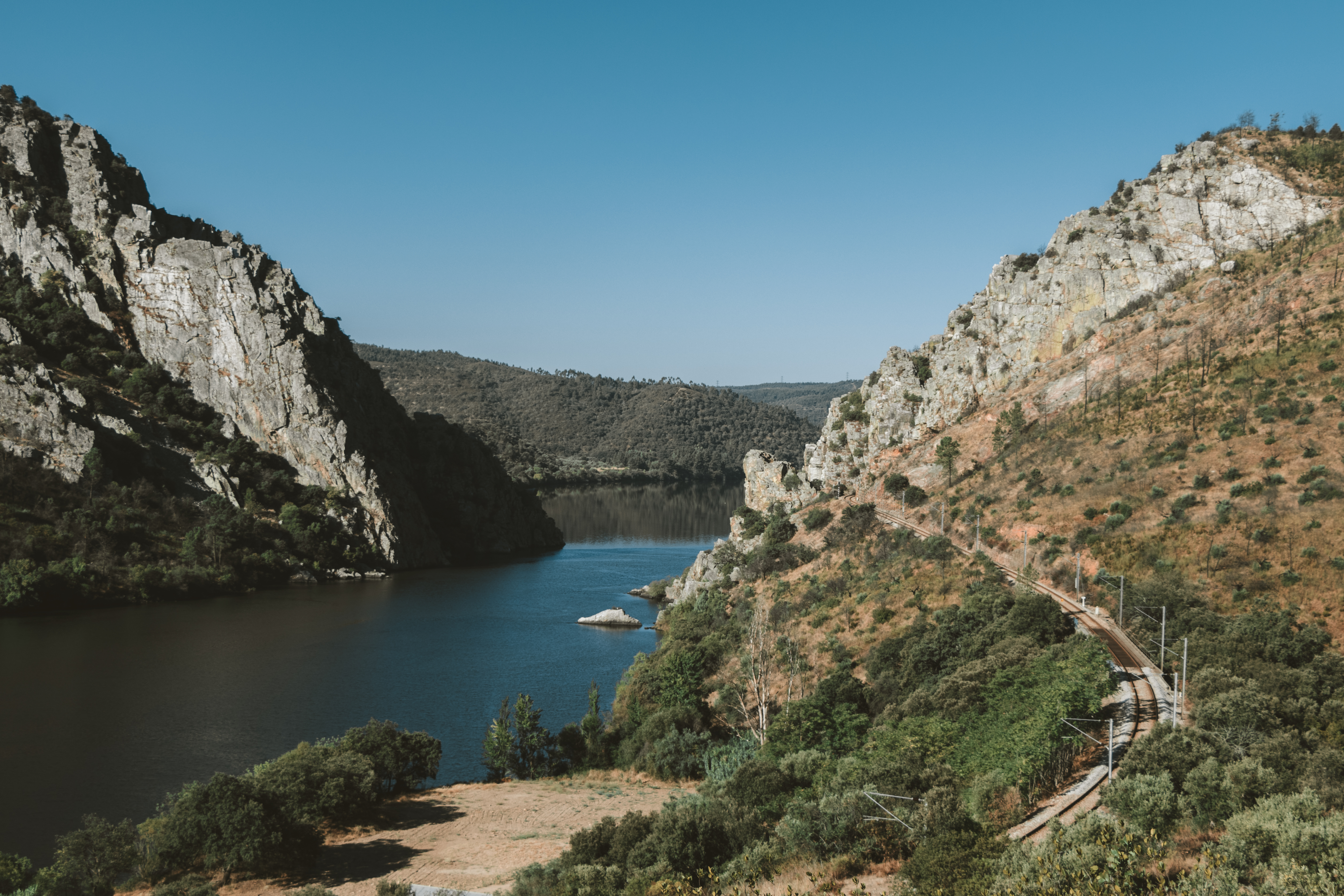
- View of Vila Velha de Ródão

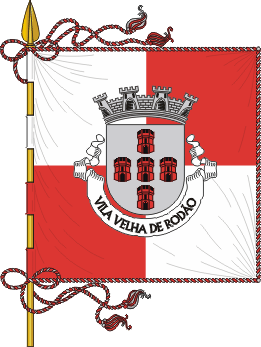
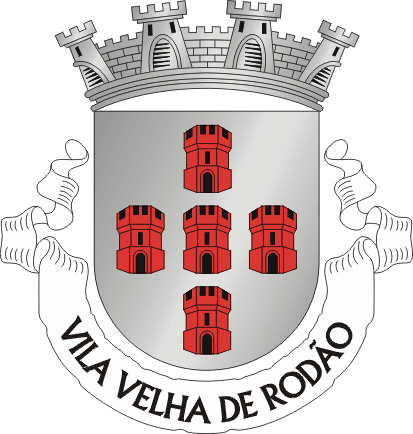
- Flag Coat of arms
- Interactive map of Vila Velha de Rodão
- Coordinates: 39°39′15″N 7°40′20″W
- Country: Portugal
- Region: Centro
- Intermunic. comm.: Beira Baixa
- District: Castelo Branco
- Parishes: 4

Government
  - President: Luís Miguel Ferro Pereira (PS)

Area
  - Total: 329.91 km^{2} (127.38 sq mi)

Population (2011)
  - Total: 3,521
  - Density: 10.67/km^{2} (27.64/sq mi)
- Time zone: UTC+00:00 (WET)
  - Summer (DST): UTC+01:00 (WEST)
- Local holiday: Monday after the 4th Sunday of August
- Website: http://www.cm-vvrodao.pt/

Vila Velha de Ródão (European Portuguese pronunciation: [ˈvilɐ ˈvɛʎɐ ðɨ ˈrɔðɐ̃w]) is a municipality in the district of Castelo Branco in Portugal. The population in 2011 was 3,521, in an area of 329.91 km^{2}.

The present mayor is Maria Carmo Sequeira, elected by the Socialist Party. The municipal holiday is the Monday after the 4th Sunday of August.

In 1762, it was the site of the Battle of Vila Velha.

On 5 November 2007, a road accident on A23 killed 15 people and injured 22.

== Climate ==
Climate data for Vila Velha de Ródão, 1985-2021, altitude: 59 m (194 ft)
Month	Jan	Feb	Mar	Apr	May	Jun	Jul	Aug	Sep	Oct	Nov	Dec	Year
Average precipitation mm (inches)	91.5 (3.60)	69.2 (2.72)	56.7 (2.23)	63.6 (2.50)	50.7 (2.00)	15.0 (0.59)	4.1 (0.16)	6.6 (0.26)	32.5 (1.28)	103.7 (4.08)	99.9 (3.93)	96.5 (3.80)	690 (27.15)
Source: Portuguese Environment Agency

== Parishes ==
Administratively, the municipality is divided into 4 civil parishes (freguesias):

- Fratel
- Perais
- Sarnadas de Ródão
- Vila Velha de Ródão

== Notable people ==
- Armindo Monteiro (1896 – 1955) a university professor, businessman, diplomat and politician
- Manuel Cargaleiro (born 1927 in Vila Velha de Ródão) an artist who creates ceramic and painting

== Powerboat Racing ==
In October 2020, Vila Velha de Ródão hosted the final two rounds of the UIM F2 World Championship. The series was won by Portuguese driver Duarte Benavente.
