= Oleiros, Portugal =

Oleiros
- Municipality
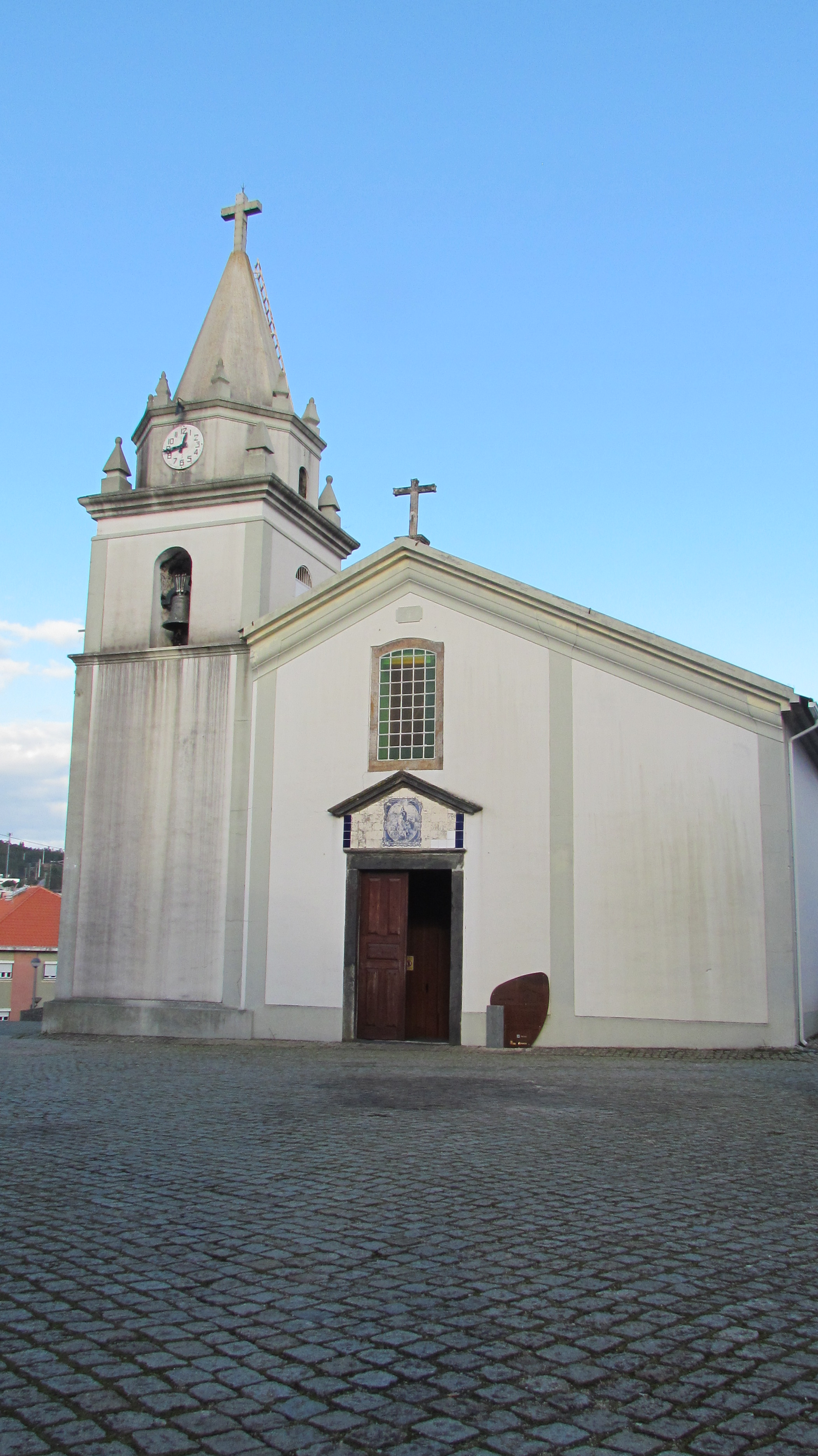

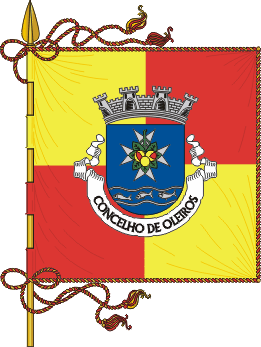
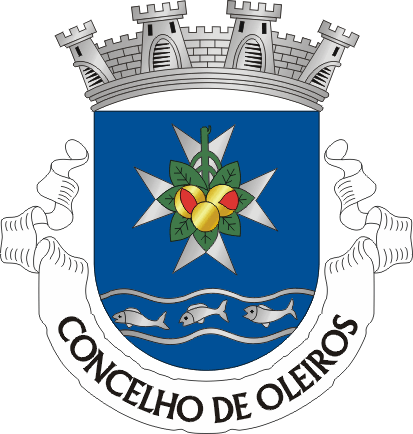
- Flag Coat of arms
- Interactive map of Oleiros
- Coordinates: 39.9186°N 7.9128°W
- Country: Portugal
- Region: Centro
- Intermunic. comm.: Beira Baixa
- District: Castelo Branco
- Parishes: 10

Government
  - President: José Santos Marques (PSD)

Area
  - Total: 471.09 km^{2} (181.89 sq mi)

Population (2011)
  - Total: 5,721
  - Density: 12.14/km^{2} (31.45/sq mi)
- Time zone: UTC+00:00 (WET)
  - Summer (DST): UTC+01:00 (WEST)
- Local holiday: Monday after the 2nd Sunday of August
- Website: www.cm-oleiros.pt

Oleiros (European Portuguese pronunciation: [ɔˈlɐjɾuʃ]) is a municipality in the district of Castelo Branco in Portugal. The population in 2011 was 5,721, in an area of 471.09 km^{2}. The present mayor is José Santos Marques, elected by the Social Democratic Party. The municipal holiday is the Monday after the 2nd Sunday of August.

== Economy ==
Built in 2006, a wind farm (Pinhal Interior Wind Farm) operates in Oleiros, comprising a 54 MW power generation capacity.

== Population ==
Oleiros has a total population of 5,271 in 2011.

Population of Oleiros
Year	Pop.	±%
1890	10,476	—
1900	11,203	+6.9%
1911	12,060	+7.6%
1920	11,977	−0.7%
1930	11,891	−0.7%
1940	14,020	+17.9%
1950	15,137	+8.0%
1960	15,553	+2.7%
1970	13,110	−15.7%
1981	10,183	−22.3%
1991	7,767	−23.7%
2001	6,677	−14.0%
2011	5,721	−14.3%

== Parishes ==
Administratively, the municipality is divided into 10 civil parishes (freguesias):

- Álvaro
- Amieira - Oleiros
- Cambas
- Estreito - Vilar Barroco
- Isna
- Madeirã
- Mosteiro
- Orvalho
- Sarnadas de São Simão
- Sobral

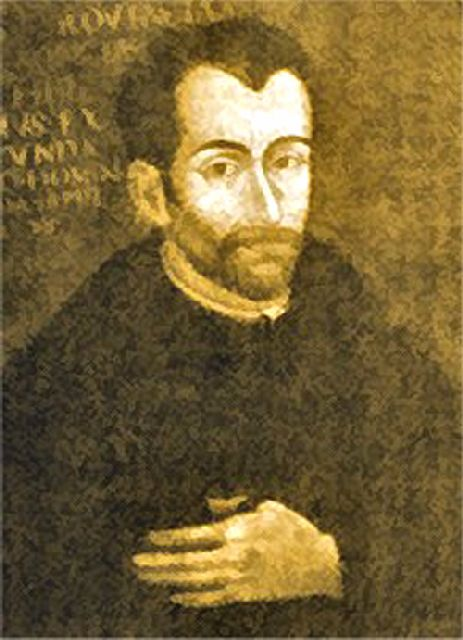
António Andrade

== Notable people ==
- Father António de Andrade (1580 – 1634) a Jesuit priest and explorer; a missionary in India, 1600–1634; the first known European to cross the Himalayas and reach Tibet.
