= Boom Festival =

Biennial transformational festival in Portugal

- Boom Festival logo

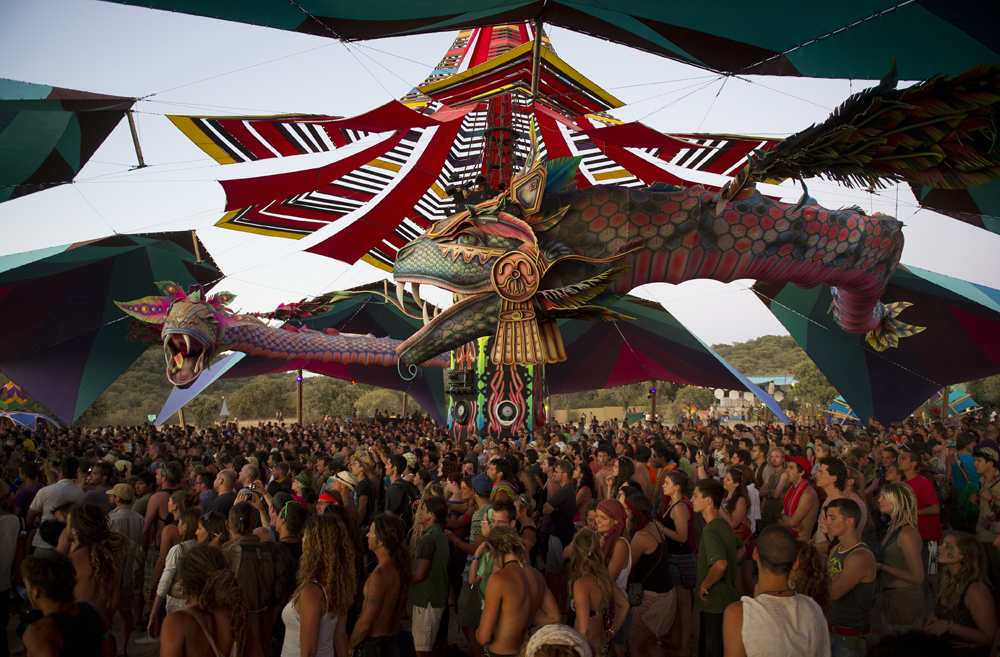
- People dancing at the Dance Temple, Boom Festival 2012
- Genre: Transformational festival, psychedelic, psytrance, arts, culture, visionary art, psytechno, world music, downtempo, electronica, chill-out
- Date: July or August (during the full moon)
- Frequency: Biennial
- Locations: Boomland, Idanha-a-Nova, Portugal
- Years active: 1997–present
- Previous event: 17–25 July 2025 (15th edition)
- Next event: 18–25 July 2027 (16th edition)
- Website: www.boomfestival.org

The Boom Festival is an international transformational festival in Idanha-a-Nova, Portugal.

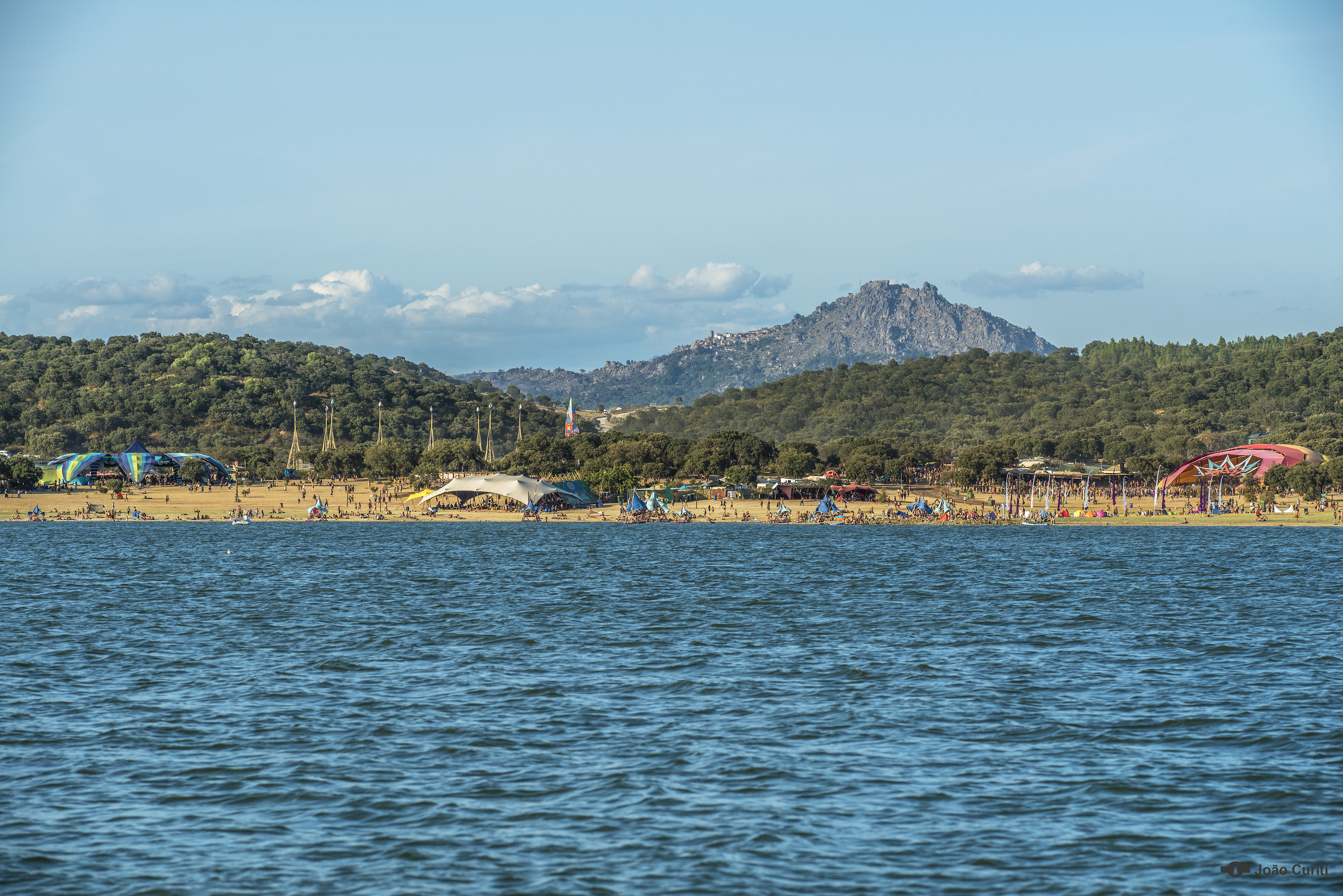
Lake view of Boom Festival 2014

Starting in 1997 in Herdade do Zambujal, Águas de Moura, Portugal as a goa trance psychedelic party, it has since then evolved into a global celebration of alternative culture.

Boom Festival gathers people from all around the globe (in 2018, 147 countries were represented) and is a fully independent festival.

Boom's has gained a reputation for its environmentalist hand-on, fusionist, experimental approach for large-scale gatherings. It is based on the following dimensions: art and creativity; water; air; soil; waste as a resource; public health; food and nutrition; engagement and social change; energy, mobility and transport; packaging; procurement and materials. The festival has won several green festival international awards since 2008.

== History ==
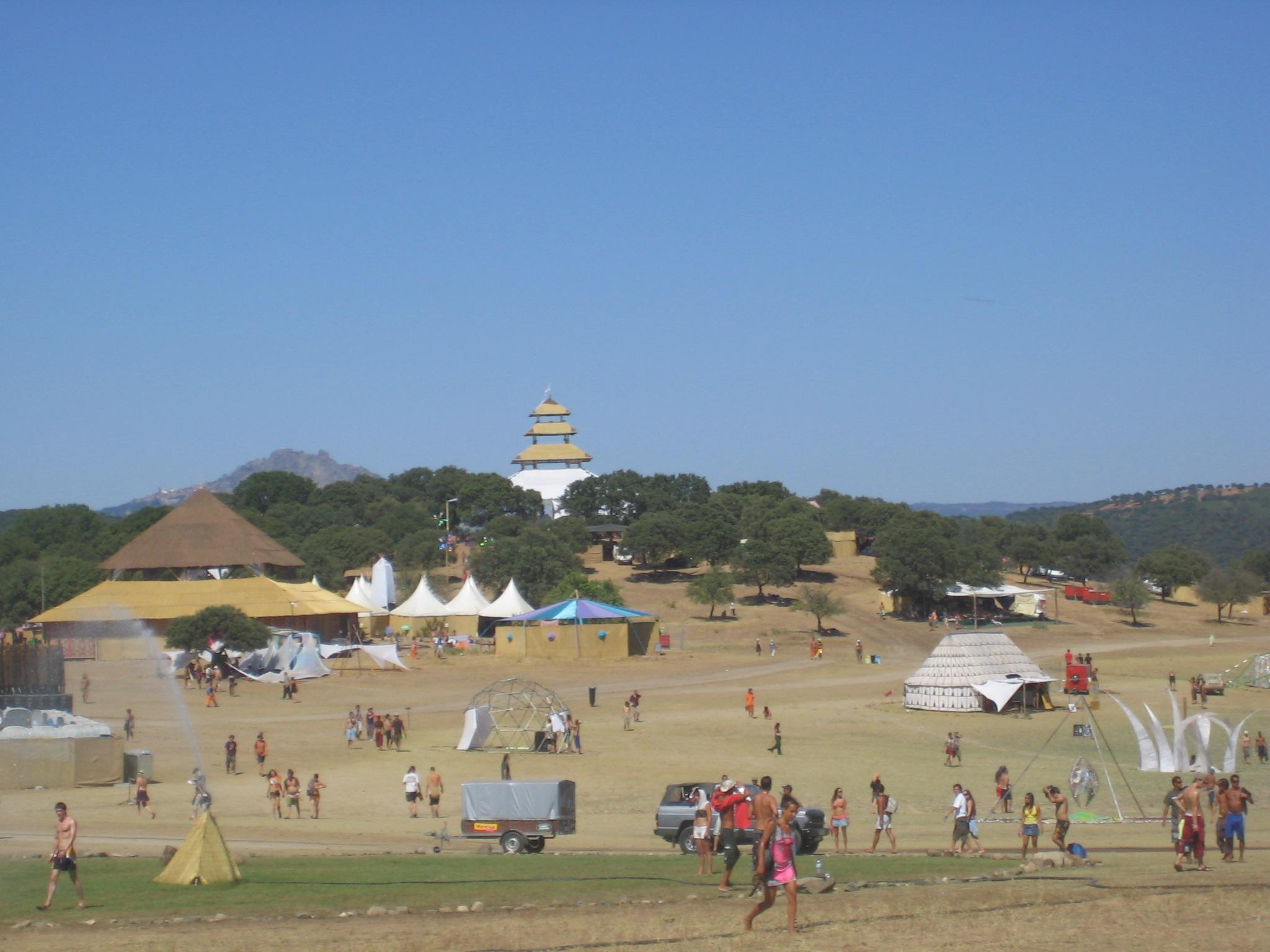
Open space.

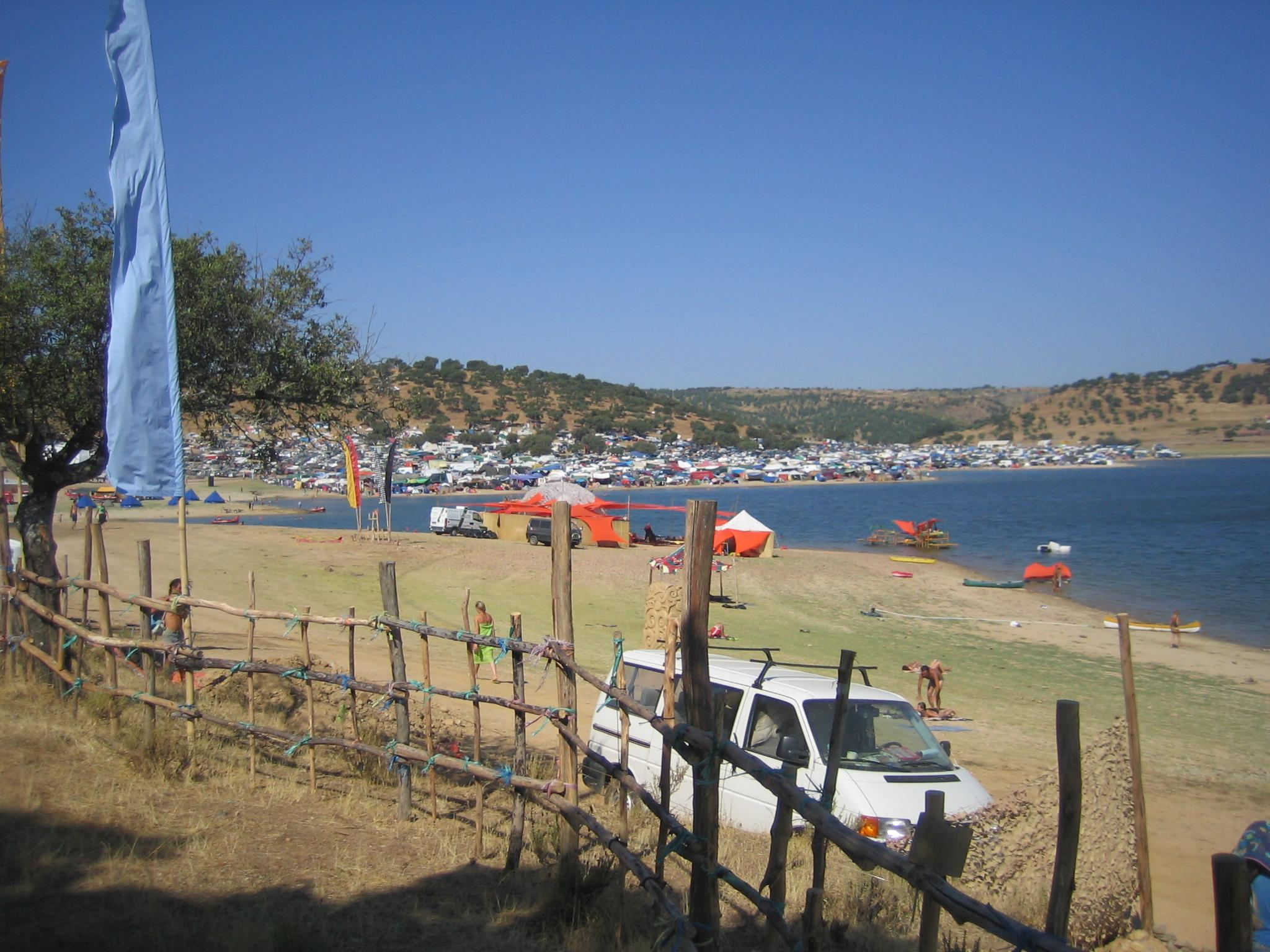
The beach on the banks of Marechal Carmona Dam reservoir.

The festival was born out of a group of friends who wanted to bring the vibe of the Goa parties to Portugal. They introduced the psychedelic movement in Portugal in the early 1990s, with regular parties in a forest and in 1997 decided to organise a festival which would bring together the Goa trancers from across the world. Thus giving birth to Boom's first edition in August 1997.

Boom's second edition took place in 1998, and from then on the festival started taking place every two years. Each edition helped steer the festival towards new concepts within psychedelic music and culture.

The last edition of the festival in the forest of Herdade do Zambujal was in 2000 with the introduction of new areas such a new conference area and new music areas. It also marked the arrival of a whole new generation to the global psychedelic scene that converged to Portugal to celebrate Boom.

In 2002 the festival moved to the shores of the Idanha-a-Nova lake. Between 2002 and 2008, the festival started to develop not only a multidisciplinary vision of the psychedelic trance culture and beyond, but it also pioneered multiple sustainability and regeneration projects. In 2008, the festival sells out for the first time.

In 2010 the festival moved to the other shore side of the Idanha-a-Nova lake, allowing the festival to further develop and to launch the Boomland project: a permanent space for regeneration, inspired in free and independent cultural spaces, and which hosts sustainable events that aim at human transformation.

The Boom Festival 20 Years documentary (1997–2017) film sums up its origins, 11 editions of the festival it's wider place within the psychedelic movement and all the projects which emerged from it over time.

The 13th edition of Boom Festival took place on 22–29 July 2022 with The Anthropocene as its main theme, after being rescheduled due to the COVID-19 pandemic. In 2023, there was an additional, consecutive edition —an unusual occurrence— brought about by adjustments and rescheduling necessitated by the COVID-19 pandemic. This shift permanently moved the festival’s biennial rotation (which historically took place in even-numbered years) to odd-numbered years.

== Editions and themes ==
- 1. 1997: No theme
- 2. 1998: No theme
- 3. 2000: No theme
- 4. 2002: No theme
- 5. 2004: No theme
- 6. 2006: No theme
- 7. 2008: No theme
- 8. 2010: Water
- 9. 2012: Alchemy
- 10. 2014: The Feminine
- 11. 2016: Shamanism
- 12. 2018: Sacred Geometry
- 13. 2022: The Anthropocene
- 14. 2023: Radical Love
- 15. 2025: The Ritual of Dance

== Vision ==
Psychedelic for Boom means "to think outside the box". Psychedelic means mind manifesting but has been associated as an attribute for music, arts in general and alternative ways of life. Boom's perspective on psychedelia is that every single individual is essentially free. Free to think, to act, to create, and to respect one another. It is awakening a holistic awareness that all beings share the same pulse of life, that they are part of an interconnected Universe. Boom does not believe in the psychedelic orthodoxy that advocates being boxed into one style of music, one lifestyle, or one philosophy. Boom also does not resonate with the narrative that psychedelic consciousness means intoxication. To be free is to be aware, is to challenge the limits, is to think outside the box and not to submit to the dominant culture.

== Culture and art program ==
Dance Temple

Where Psychedelic Trance is played.

Alchemy Circle

Deep, hypnotic sounds and electronic music. Not an alternative floor, but rather another place of psychedelic music expression.

The Gardens (formerly known as the Chill Out Gardens) Chill Out music in all its forms provides the slo-mo soundtrack, both synthesised and hand-made, to this area. The surrounding hubs enhance this experience through workshops and therapies.

Sacred Fire

World music and hands-on workshops embedded into organic architecture and landscaping.

Being Fields

This is a nexus for countless Boomers to enjoy 20 hours of practice each day, including yoga, meditation, sound healing, shamanic rituals, oriental practice, alternative medicine and more.

Liminal Village

Cultural hub featuring talks, discussion panels, Q&A's, workshops, and night-time cinema program under the name "Paradigm Films".

NGO Dome

NGOs, collectives and individuals: underdogs of social change take to the stage with empowering eco-tech tools and projects.

Nataraj Dance Stage

Nata (dance) and Raja (king) is the Sanskrit reference to Hindu god Shiva. Experience rhythmic workshops by day and a program of contemporary dance performances by night.

Young Dragons

Interactive playgrounds, workshops, performance art, cinema and theatre for the younger generation of Boomers and their families. A space in nature dedicated to children and youngsters aged 3 to 12.

Art Installations

Boomland is an open-air art gallery. Open air art and Boom's sustainability ethos form a symbiosis to educate participants in the most aesthetic way.

Performances

Performances at Boom happen all across the venue. In 2021, the program features immersive interventions, circus, dance and artistic residencies.

Bike Village

A meeting place, repair and workshop hub for bikers and bicycle enthusiasts.

Fine Art Galleries

A brand new concept for displaying visual arts across Boomland in 2021. Visionary art itself has been one of the core components of the festival since 2002, and Boom has contributed to its dissemination in festival culture. Following this era, the festival now explores the connection between art and its relation to the sacred and the Anthropocene, entering a new phase showcasing fine arts at Boom.

Social Hubs

Cozy social areas equipped with community kitchens, first aid points, helpful stewards and activities for children and adults alike.

Participation

Boom is a reflection of its own participants. As a highly collaborative experience, it resonates with the principle of co-creation, to allow for a maximum of artistic freedom and expression. For this reason, the festival encourages anyone who wishes to contribute to apply via the official website.

== Social and environmental program ==
Boom intervenes in the following dimensions: Art & Creativity; Water; Soil; Air; Waste as a Resource; Procurement & Materials; Public Health; Food & Nutrition; Engagement & Social Change; Mobility & Transport; Energy; Packaging.

== Awards ==
In 2004, Boom began a series of environmentally self-sustainable projects, which include: toilets that don't use chemical products, the treatment of residual waters using biotechnology, utilisation of wind and solar energy, recycling and the free supply of cleaning kits to participants (including pocket ashtrays and rubbish bags). It has been assessed and awarded with the Outstanding Greener Festival Award in 2008, 2010, 2012, 2014, and 2016.

In 2011, it won, for the second year in a row, the YOUROPE prize/Green 'N' Clean Festival of the Year in the Festival Awards Europe. As a result, the United Nations invited the organizing team to use the popularity of music as a means for raising public environmental awareness in a program called United Nations Music & Environmental Initiative (M&E).

Awards:

- Outstanding Greener Festival Award 2018, 2016, 2014, 2012, 2010 and 2008.
- International Greener Festival – Greener Creative Award 2018.
- European Festival Awards 2010 – Green’n’Clean Festival of the Year.
- European Festival Awards 2012 – Shortlisted as one of the three greenest festivals of the year.
- European Festival Awards 2014 – Nominated as one of the most environmentally friendly events of the year.
- Green Inspiration Awards 2012.
- Member of the United Nations Music & Environment Stakeholder Initiative (2010).

== Boomland project ==
Boom has been taking place on Herdade da Granja since 2010. In 2016, the organisation launched a crowdfunding campaign to acquire the land, ultimately leading to its purchase on 28 September 2016. The land is managed by IdanhaCulta, a non-profit organisation with several associates, one of which is Good Mood (the organiser of Boom Festival).

== See also ==
- Burning Man
- Fusion Festival
- Ozora Festival
- Psy-Fi
- Tamera
- List of electronic music festivals
