= Ílhavo =

- Municipality
- City of Ílhavo
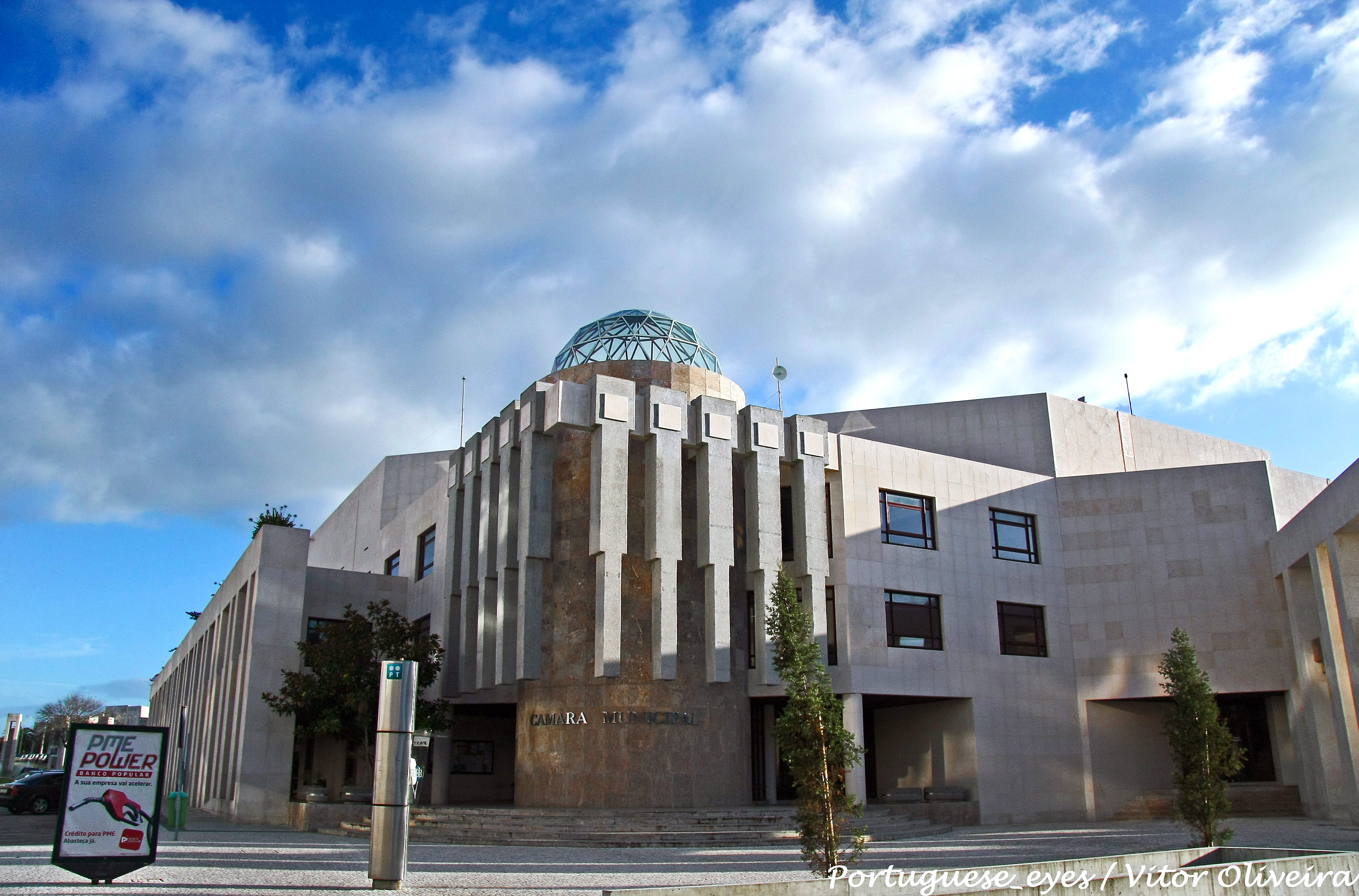
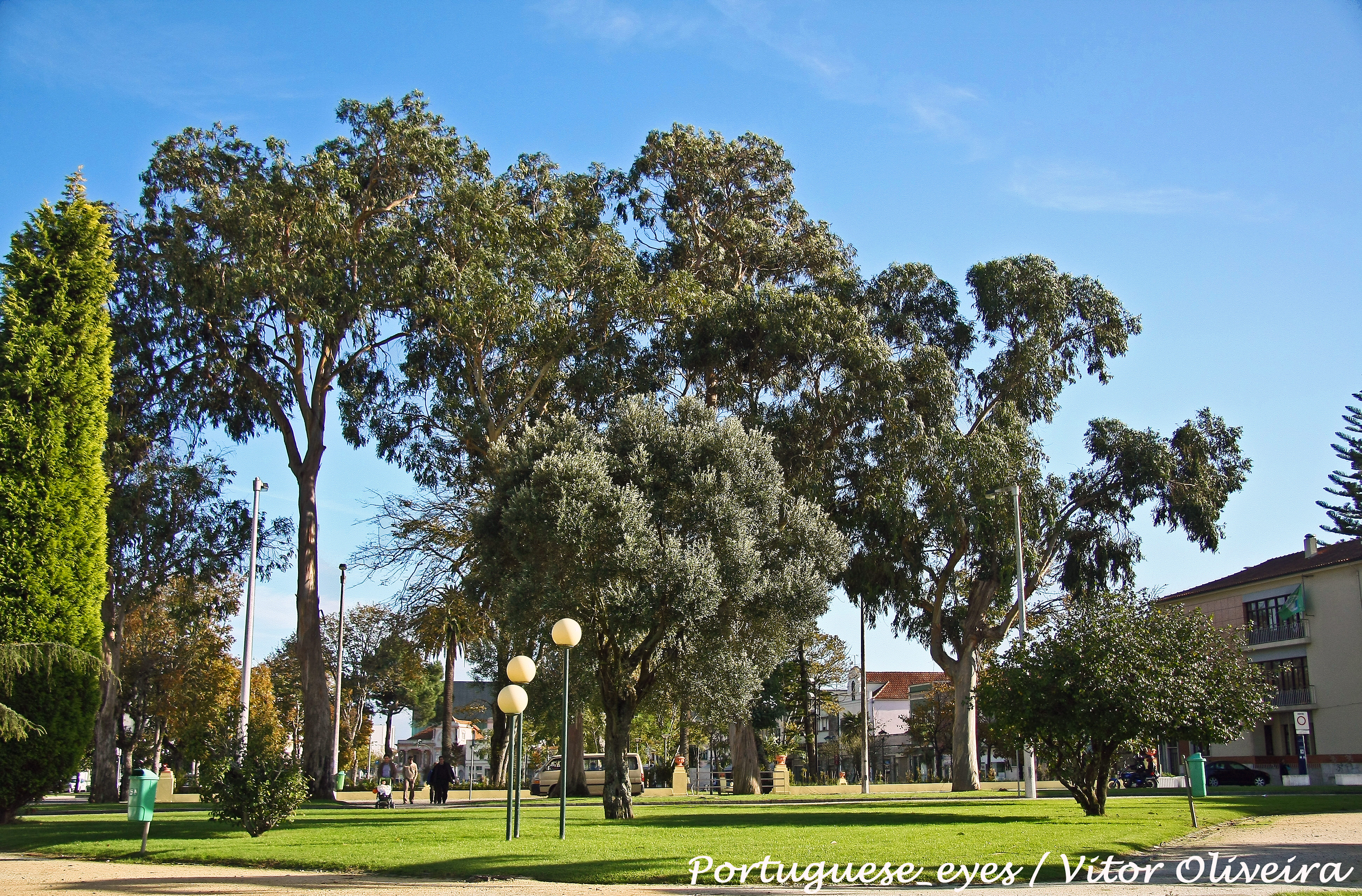
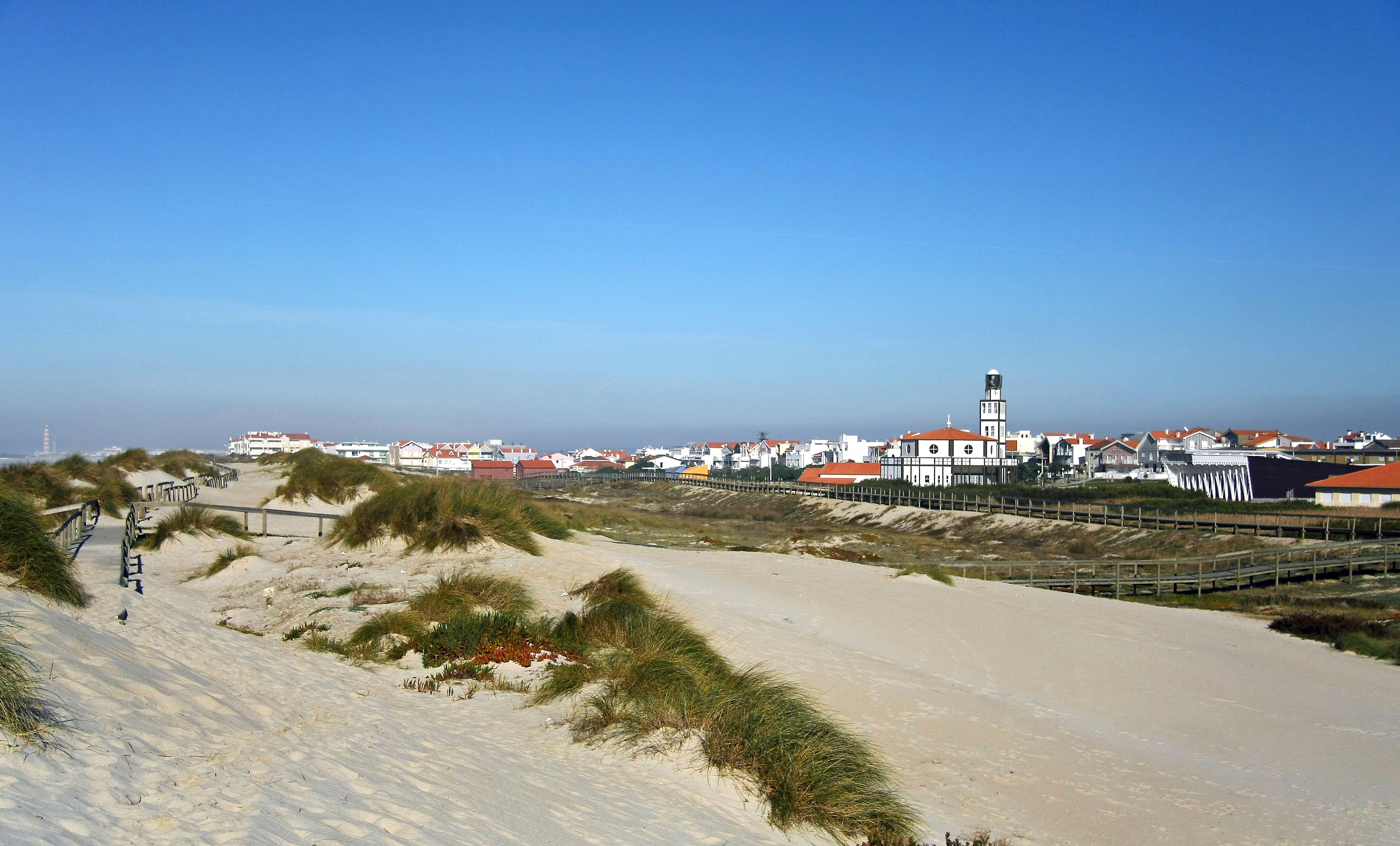
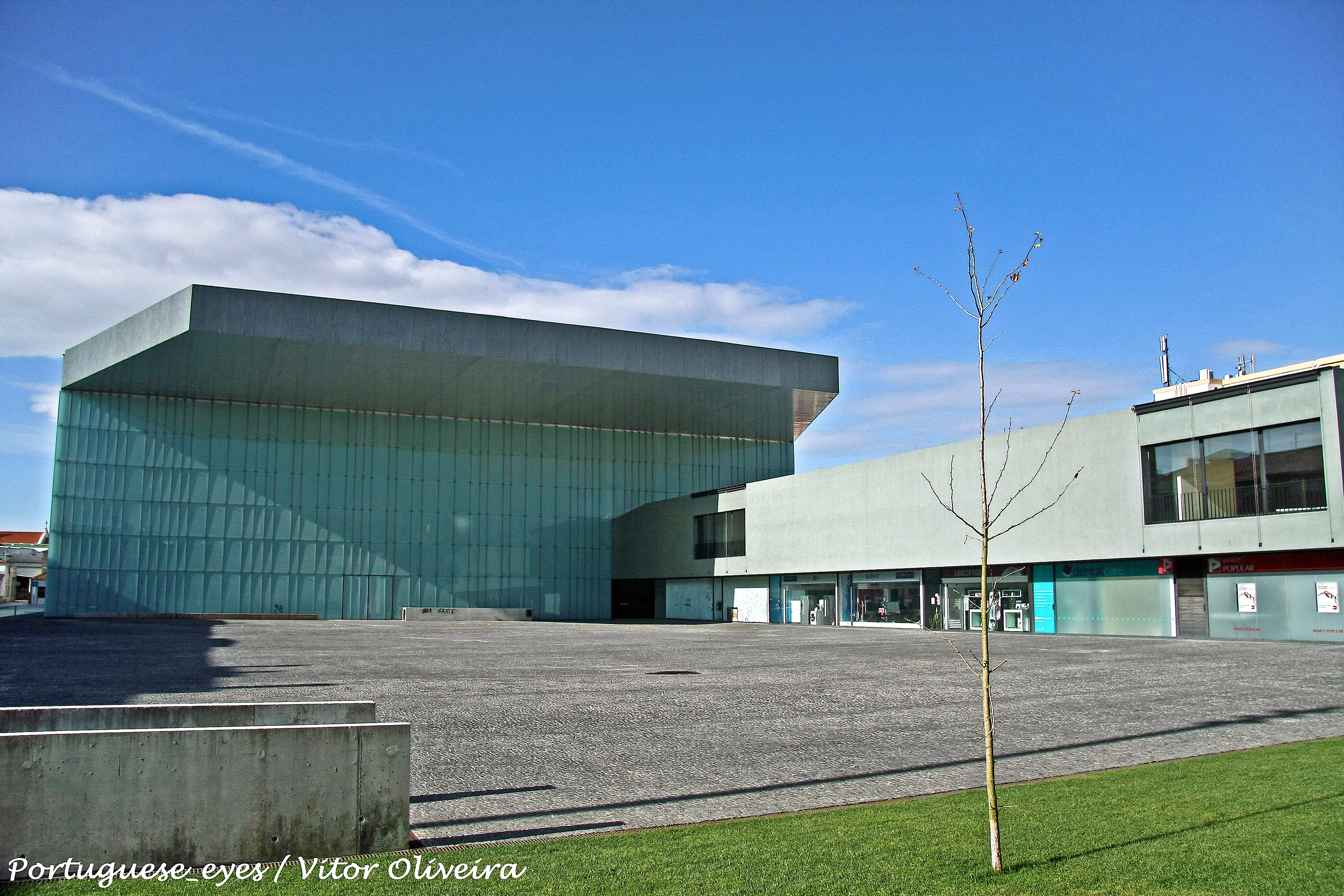
- From top left to right: The city council, the Henriqueta Maia Park, the Costa Nova beach dunes and Ílhavo Cultural Center.

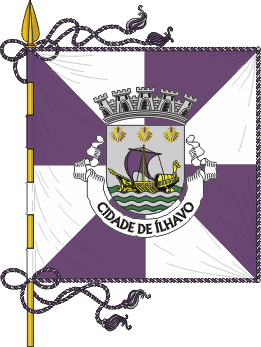
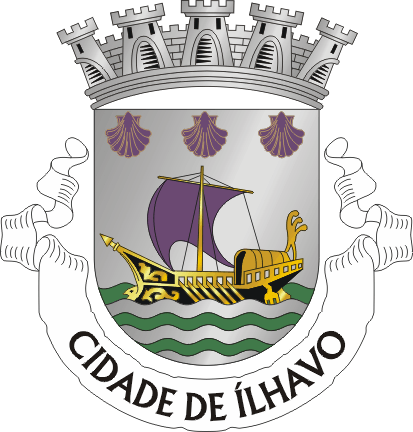
- Flag Coat of arms
- Interactive map of Ílhavo
- Coordinates: 40°36′N 8°40′W
- Country: Portugal
- Region: Centro
- Intermunic. comm.: Região de Aveiro
- District: Aveiro
- Parishes: 4

Government
  - President: João Campolargo (Unir para Fazer, 2021-2025)

Area
  - Total: 73.48 km^{2} (28.37 sq mi)

Population (2021)
  - Total: 39,239
  - Density: 534.0/km^{2} (1,383/sq mi)
- Time zone: UTC+00:00 (WET)
  - Summer (DST): UTC+01:00 (WEST)
- Local holiday: Easter Monday (date varies)
- Website: www.cm-ilhavo.pt

Ílhavo (Portuguese pronunciation: [ˈiʎɐvu]), officially the City of Ílhavo (Portuguese: Cidade de Ílhavo), is a city and municipality located in the Aveiro District of central Portugal. The population in 2021 was 39,239, in an area of 73.48 km^{2}.

The Municipality of Ílhavo includes four parishes and two cities: Gafanha da Nazaré and Ílhavo proper.

== General information ==
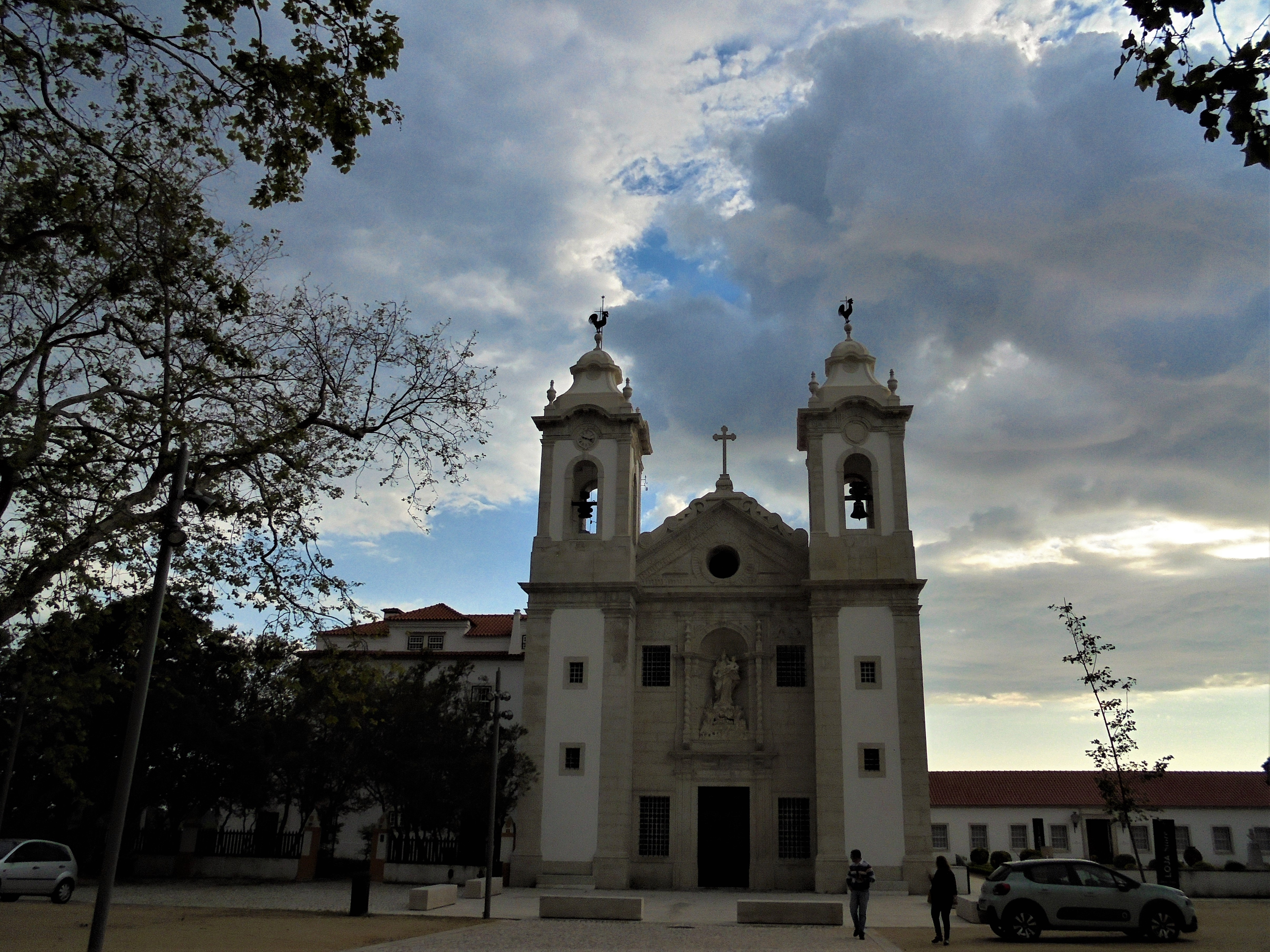
Capela de Nossa Senhora da Penha de França or Capela of Vista Alegre, a 17th century chapel

Several stories have been gathered as part of the history of this city:

Traditionally, the local women — As ilhavenses — are famous for their beauty. It is claimed the city was founded by Greek colonists around 400 BC to whom the beauty of "ilhavenses" women is attributed, but others state that the Phoenician settlers are the ones responsible for that.

Ílhavo's nickname is "the city of the lamp" (a cidade da lâmpada). According to legend, one Sunday during Mass, one of the most important relics of the church (an oil lamp) was stolen in front of everybody and was never found. The myth continued given Ílhavo that nickname.

== Parishes ==
Administratively, the municipality is divided into four civil parishes (freguesias):

- Gafanha da Encarnação
- Gafanha da Nazaré
- Gafanha do Carmo
- Ílhavo (São Salvador)

== Cities and towns ==
There are two cities in the municipality.

- Gafanha da Nazaré (city)
- Ílhavo (City)

== Civic information ==
The municipality day is Easter Monday.

City hall motto: "The Sea as Tradition".

== Tourism ==
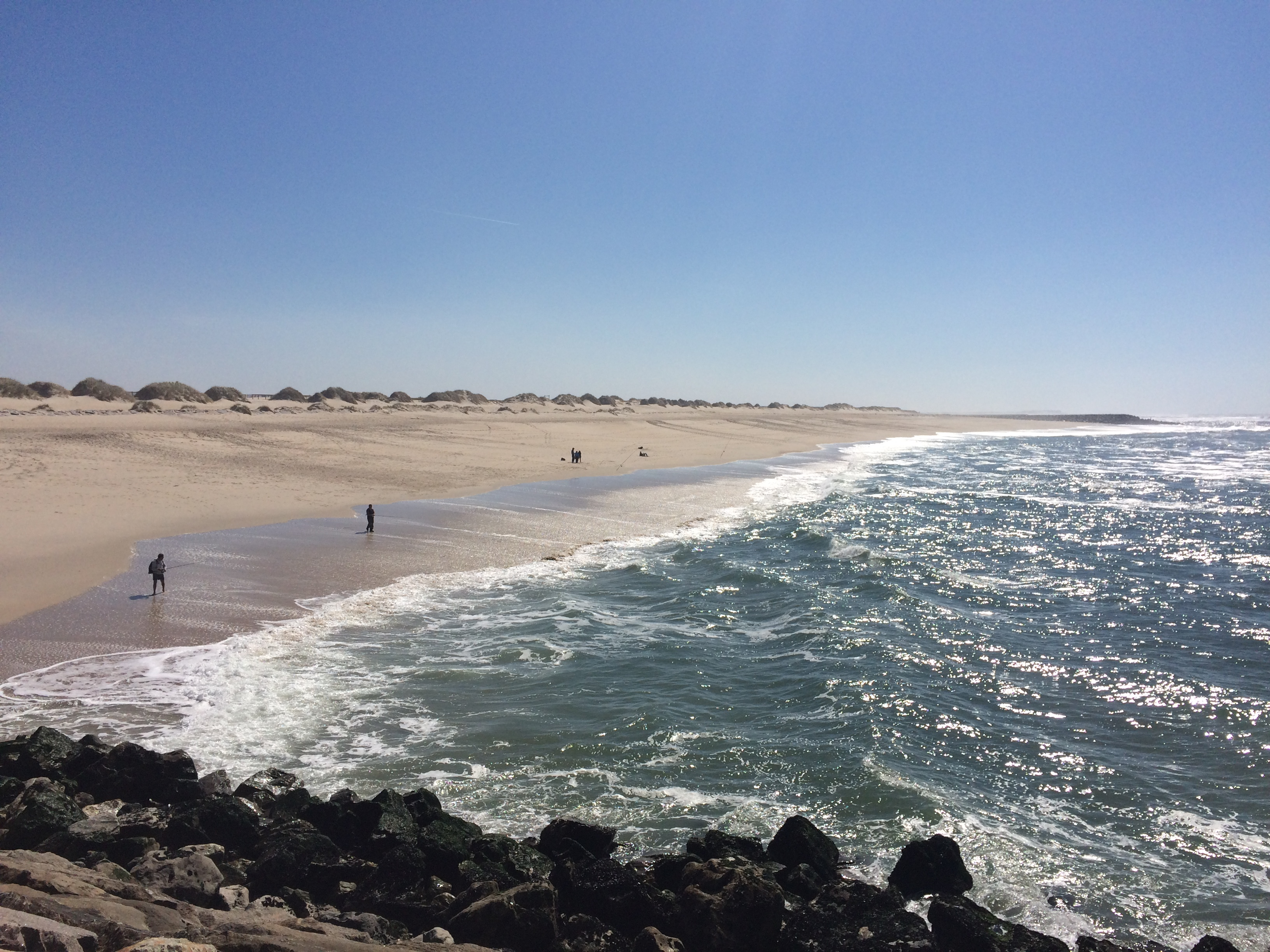
Praia da Costa Nova

Museums and visitor attractions in the area include the Maritime Museum of Ílhavo, with its Codfish Aquarium, Santo André's Ship Museum and the Investigation and Entrepreneurship Centre, one of the most visited across the country, honouring all those who, in the past and the present, dedicate their lives to fishing, either at deep-sea – such as cod fishing – at the coast or at the lagoon, and even to riverside activities.

Of that same type is the Museum of Vista Alegre, yet today, a symbol for national excellence on the fields of creativity, quality and entrepreneurship. Reminiscent of not only the industrial heritage of this factory, but also the path of its working community, which is one of the biggest, oldest and still-working European industrial neighborhoods where there is a lot to learn and to live. The Cardadores are iconic figures from Vale de Ilhavo's traditional Carnival.

Such a lifestyle, from each one of the communities of this polycentric territory, is taken out from the gardens, streets and alleys into the cultural equipments... the "Casa da Cultura" is a second home for spectators and artists, a place to welcome the world, the "Fábrica das Ideias", just as the industrial city where it is settled – Gafanha da Nazaré – produces and exports art, by being at the service of artistic creation. The "Laboratório das Artes - Vista Alegre Theatre" is a space aimed at thinking, research and experiment, by welcoming the most erudite cultural events, either classical or contemporary. Finally, "Cais Criativo" is a young and effervescent space in the summer, relaxing, just as the beach where it is located – Costa Nova, and introspective and inspiring during the winter.

Sailing, surfing, kitesurfing, canoeing or diving, apart from major water sports and other sport varieties, are the motivational poster of the estuary and the sea, natural amphitheatres for water sports, at a Municipality where bikes, hiking or sport practice at the various public fields, are part of leisure activities, which also includes relaxing at the charismatic beaches of Barra and Costa Nova.

== Demographics ==
Population of Ílhavo Municipality (1801–2021)

Year	Pop.	±%
1801	5,436	—
1849	6,797	+25.0%
1900	13,163	+93.7%
1930	17,709	+34.5%

Year	Pop.	±%
1960	25,108	+41.8%
1981	31,383	+25.0%
1991	33,235	+5.9%
2001	37,209	+12.0%

Year	Pop.	±%
2008	41,271	+10.9%
2011	38,598	−6.5%
2021	39,239	+1.7%

== International relations ==
=== Twin towns and sister cities ===
Ílhavo is twinned with:

- Funchal, Portugal
- Grindavík, Iceland
- Ihtiman, Bulgaria
- New Bedford, United States
- Newark, United States
- Paraty, Brazil
- Cabo Frio, Brazil
- St. John's, Canada

=== Friendship ===
- Cuxhaven, Germany

== Notable people ==
- Tomé de Barros Queirós (1872–1925) a Portuguese businessman and politician in the First Portuguese Republic
- Mário Sacramento (1920–1969) a Portuguese physician and essayist, antifascist activist
- António Bagão Félix (born 1948) a Portuguese economist and politician.
- Maria Rebelo (born 1956) a retired female marathon runner, competed in two summer Olympics
