= Manuel de Paiva Boléo =

Manuel de Paiva Boléo (26 March 1904 in Idanha-a-Nova – 1 November 1992 in Coimbra, Portugal) was a professor of Romance philology and Portuguese linguistics.
