= Idanha-a-Nova =

- Municipality
- Town of Idanha-a-Nova
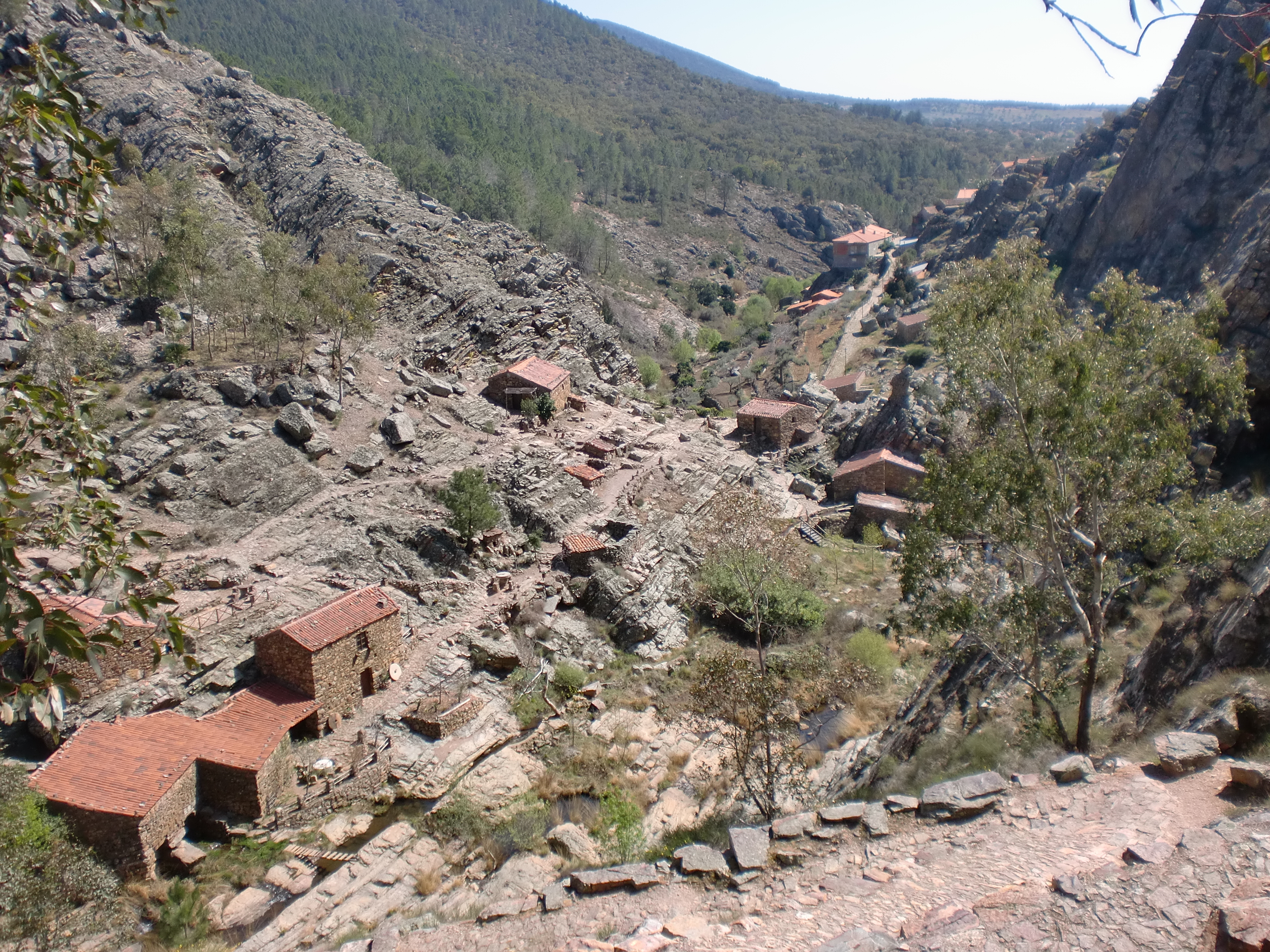
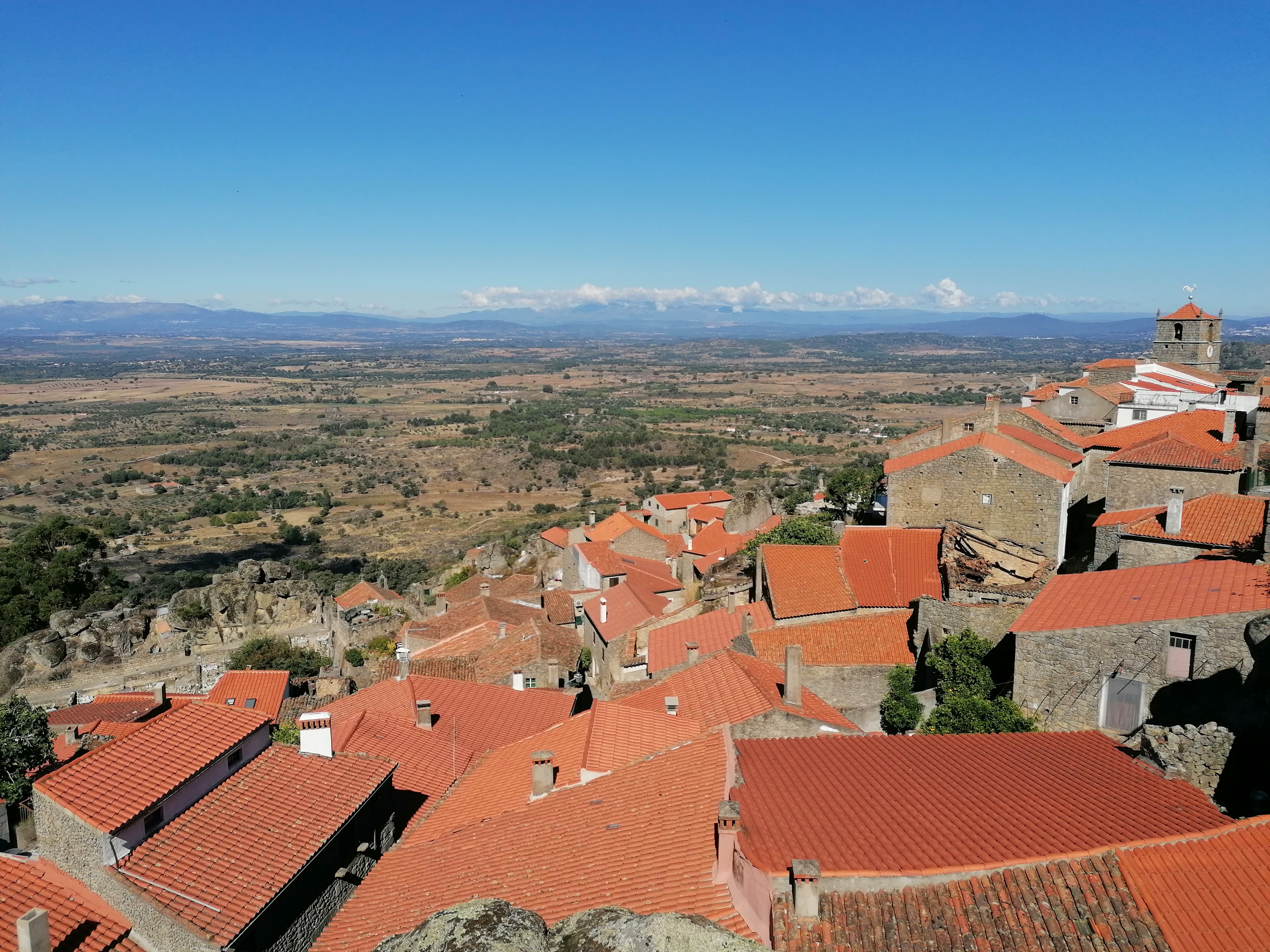
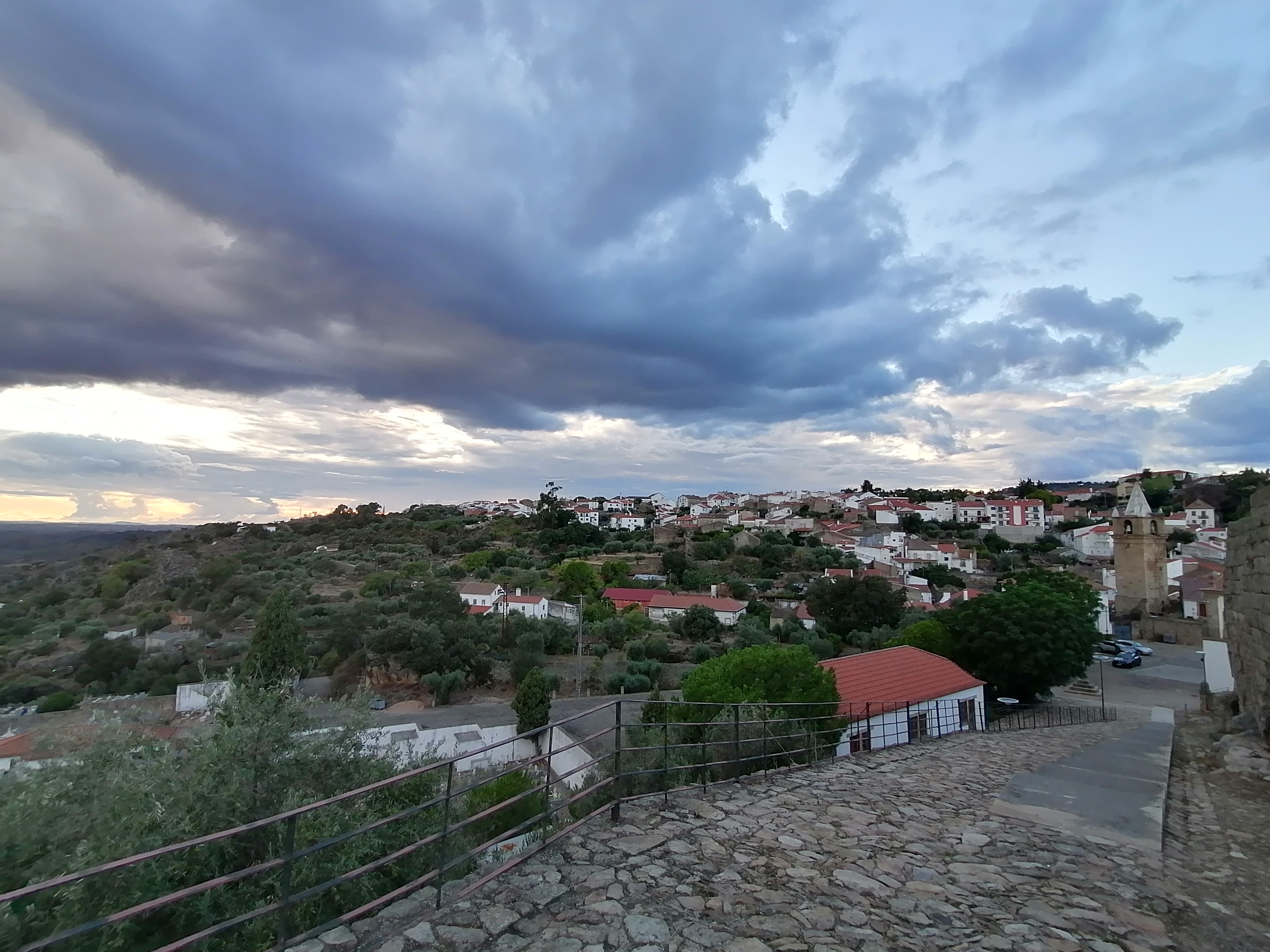
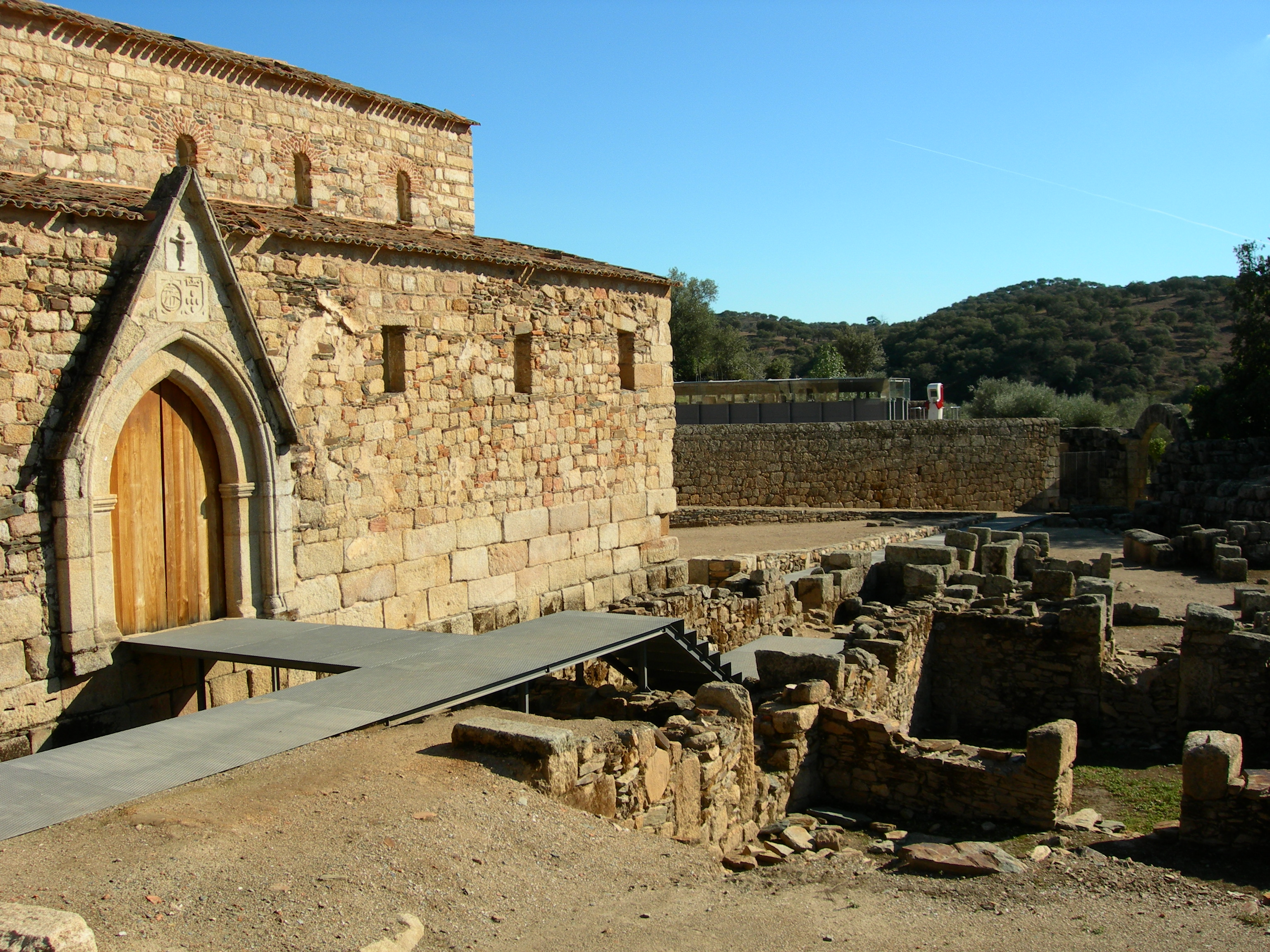
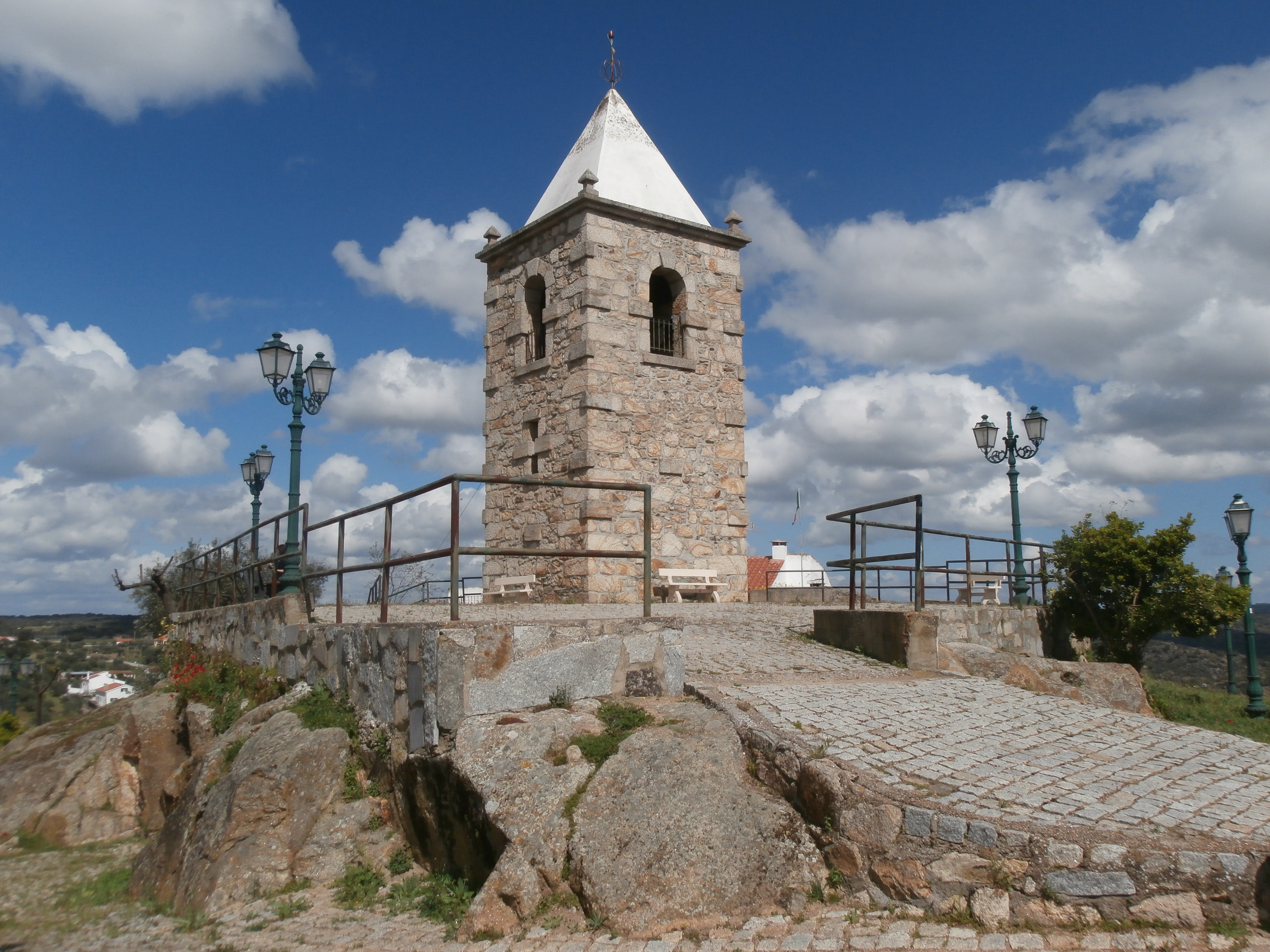

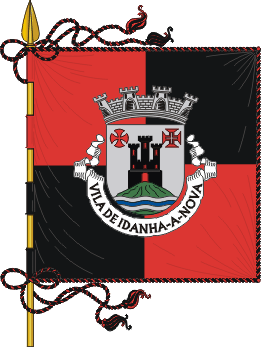
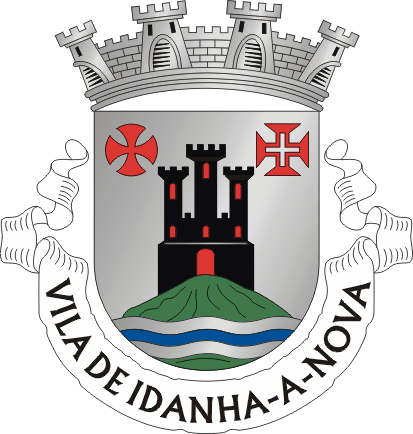
- Flag Coat of arms
- Interactive map of Idanha-a-Nova
- Location in Portugal
- Coordinates: 39°55′N 7°14′W
- Country: Portugal
- Region: Centro
- Intermunic. comm.: Beira Baixa
- District: Castelo Branco
- Parishes: 13

Government
  - President: Armindo Moreira Palma Jacinto (PS)

Area
  - Total: 1,416.34 km^{2} (546.85 sq mi)

Population (2011)
  - Total: 9,716
  - Density: 6.860/km^{2} (17.77/sq mi)
- Time zone: UTC+00:00 (WET)
  - Summer (DST): UTC+01:00 (WEST)
- Local holiday: Monday 15 days after Easter
- Website: Official website

Idanha-a-Nova (pronounced [iˈðɐɲɐ ɐ ˈnɔvɐ] or [iˌðɐɲaˈnɔvɐ]), officially the Town of Idanha-a-Nova (Portuguese: Vila de Idanha-a-Nova), is a town and municipality in the district of Castelo Branco, in east-central Portugal. A border municipality with Spain, the population of the municipality in 2011 was 9,716, in an area of 1416.34 km^{2}, making it one of the largest and least densely populated municipalities in Portugal as well as the first Portuguese municipality by population ageing. King Afonso II (1211–1223) confirmed its charter in 1219 renaming the village with the current place names (Idanha-a-Nova) to distinguish it from the old Idanha (hereinafter Idanha-a-Velha), 18 kilometers away. The municipal holiday is the Monday 15 days after Easter. The incumbent mayor is Armindo Moreira Palma Jacinto, representing the Socialist Party.

== History ==
There are numerous prehistoric vestiges of human occupation throughout the municipality of Idanha-a-Nova (Idanha "the new"), such as menhirs and tapirs. The Romans had an important influence, namely in the civil parishes of Monsanto, Idanha-a-Velha (Idanha "the old", formerly known as the Roman Civitas Igaeditanorum and the Germanic Egitânia) and Ladoeiro and in the countryside around the town of Idanha-a-Nova proper, where there was a Roman villa, immortalized in an ancient mosaic. After the fall of the Roman Empire, the Suevi and Visigoths dominated, and is from that time the creation of the now extinct Bishopric of Egitânia. In terms of architectural heritage, Egitânia (Idanha-a-Velha) stands out as an archaeological site from the year 534, which was one of the most important cities in Lusitania at a time, with the remaining sections of Roman pavements and the Romanesque bridge, built over the Ponsul River. In 1187, a castle was built by Gualdim Pais, a Portuguese crusader, Knight Templar in the service of Afonso Henriques of Portugal. King Sancho I (1185–1211) granted Idanha a foral charter in 1201 in order to encourage the settlement and defence of the land. His successor, King Afonso II (1211–1223) confirmed this charter in 1219 renaming the village with the current place names (Idanha-a-Nova) to distinguish it from the old Idanha (hereinafter Idanha-a-Velha), 18 kilometers away. The village of Idanha-a-Nova has developed a lot since then, at the same time Idanha-a-Velha went into steady decline. In the late fifteenth century, King Manuel I of Portugal (1495–1521), was surprised with the difference in the development of the two Idanhas (1496) and in June 1510, recognizing the progress of Idanha-a-Nova, granted it new charter. At this time, the town and its castle, including the layout, was recorded down by Duarte de Armas in his Book of Fortresses in 1509. A border municipality with Spain, the whole area was theatre of war, skirmishes and invasions throughout several periods in Portuguese history. A large part of the population of the entire area migrated to other parts of Portugal and foreign countries from the 1960s onwards. The massive exodus was due to economic reasons since the area remained cut-off from the rest of the country and neighboring Spain as well as largely underdeveloped throughout most of the 20th century. From the 2000s to the early 2020s, thanks to EU structural and cohesion funds, inland Portugal's settlement policies, the rise of tourism in Portugal and a wave of foreign direct investment, the depopulation phenomenon was mitigated but the municipality is still characterized by stagnation in population growth and intense population ageing.

== Economy ==
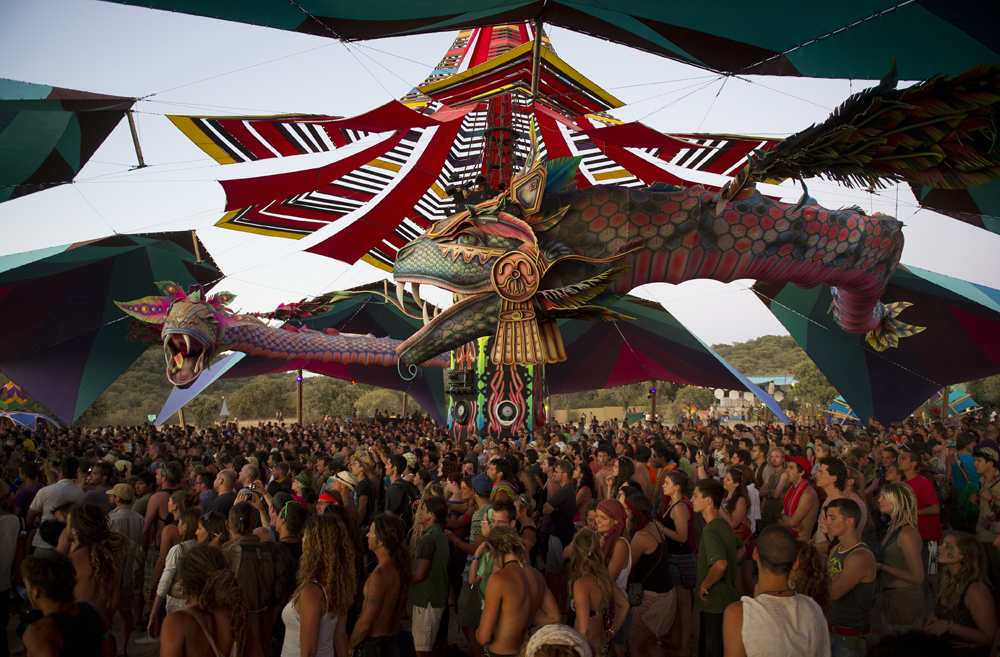
Boom Festival international music and culture festival.

The economy of the municipality of Idanha-a-Nova revolves around agriculture, animal husbandry, forestry, tourism, local government and agribusiness. The municipality has excelled in sustainable farming, crop seeds, cheesemaking and horticulture, as well as a center of olive and almond production and processing. The town of Idanha-a-Nova has a large variety of shops, cafés and restaurants. The largest supermarket in the town is a Intermarché. The Marechal Carmona Dam, a gravity dam, is within the municipality. Near the reservoir of this dam, on its left bank, the camping park of Idanha is found. The municipality of Idanha-a-Nova has hosted the internationally renowned Boom Festival since 2002. The Corpo Nacional de Escutas (CNE, National Corps of Scouts), the largest Portuguese scouting organization, has a major, permanent scout centre in the municipality of Idanha-a-Nova where Portugal's National Scout Jamboree (ACANAC) takes place. During both Boom Festival and the National Scout Jamboree (ACANAC), the population of the municipality temporarily increases several fold. Termas de Monfortinho spa town is also located in the municipality.

=== Green Valley Food Lab ===
The Green Valley Food Lab is a rural-based business park in Idanha-a-Nova, which is an evolution of the previous award-winning rural-based incubator. It was designed by the local authorities of Idanha-a-Nova as a Portuguese "Silicon Valley" of the rural world. It has a business area of 800 hectares, which includes the properties of Couto da Várzea, Ribeiro do Freixo and Lombas, as well as the Agricultural Logistics Center of Ladoeiro. In terms of companies, by 2020, there were 55 companies located in the Green Valley Food Lab (22 blueberry producers, the largest continuous area of organic blueberry production in Europe; 60 hectares of Opuntia ficus-indica production; as well as genetic improvement of animal production; aromatic herbs; seeds; fruits and vegetables businesses). The Food Lab has developed partnerships with national and international entities to bring researchers to Idanha to help develop new ways of producing food in organic production at more competitive prices. In the Green Valley, the Collaborative Laboratory (CoLAB) of the Agência Nacional de Inovação (National Innovation Agency) operates Idanha Food Lab, which brings together 14 entities from academia and the business community and is managed by Food4Sustainability.

== Education ==
Besides kindergarten and schools with classes from the 1st to the 12th grade, Idanha-a-Nova is home to an institution of higher education, the business management school of the Polytechnic Institute of Castelo Branco.

== Parishes ==
Administratively, the municipality (concelho) is divided into 13 civil parishes (freguesias):

- Aldeia de Santa Margarida
- Idanha-a-Nova e Alcafozes (includes the town of Idanha-a-Nova, the seat of the municipality, and the village of Alcafozes)
- Ladoeiro
- Medelim
- Monfortinho e Salvaterra do Extremo
- Monsanto e Idanha-a-Velha
- Oledo
- Penha Garcia
- Proença-a-Velha
- Rosmaninhal
- São Miguel de Acha
- Toulões
- Zebreira e Segura (includes the town of Zebreira)

== Climate ==
Idanha-a-Nova has a Mediterranean climate (Köppen: Csa) with cool to mild, rainy winters and hot, dry summers. The town is located at roughly 380 m (1,250 ft) altitude. Places at lower elevations (e.g. Ladoeiro, shown below) can get even hotter in the summer, with average daily temperatures rounding 33–34 °C (91–93 °F) in July and August; experiencing on average 89 days with above 30 °C maximums and 54 days with below 0 °C minimums per year.

Climate data for Ladoeiro, Idanha-a-Nova, 1982-2000 normals and extremes, altitude: 180 m (590 ft)
Month	Jan	Feb	Mar	Apr	May	Jun	Jul	Aug	Sep	Oct	Nov	Dec	Year
Record high °C (°F)	26.0 (78.8)	24.0 (75.2)	29.8 (85.6)	31.6 (88.9)	35.5 (95.9)	42.1 (107.8)	42.0 (107.6)	42.3 (108.1)	40.8 (105.4)	33.0 (91.4)	25.6 (78.1)	21.5 (70.7)	42.3 (108.1)
Mean daily maximum °C (°F)	13.8 (56.8)	15.7 (60.3)	19.7 (67.5)	20.4 (68.7)	24.2 (75.6)	29.7 (85.5)	33.7 (92.7)	33.2 (91.8)	29.4 (84.9)	23.3 (73.9)	17.7 (63.9)	14.9 (58.8)	23.0 (73.4)
Daily mean °C (°F)	7.6 (45.7)	9.3 (48.7)	11.9 (53.4)	13.3 (55.9)	16.8 (62.2)	21.4 (70.5)	24.6 (76.3)	24.0 (75.2)	21.0 (69.8)	16.2 (61.2)	11.9 (53.4)	9.1 (48.4)	15.6 (60.1)
Mean daily minimum °C (°F)	1.5 (34.7)	2.8 (37.0)	4.1 (39.4)	6.2 (43.2)	9.3 (48.7)	13.1 (55.6)	15.3 (59.5)	14.5 (58.1)	12.5 (54.5)	9.2 (48.6)	6.0 (42.8)	3.5 (38.3)	8.2 (46.7)
Record low °C (°F)	−8.0 (17.6)	−6.5 (20.3)	−6.0 (21.2)	−4.8 (23.4)	−1.5 (29.3)	4.0 (39.2)	6.8 (44.2)	7.5 (45.5)	4.0 (39.2)	0.0 (32.0)	−5.0 (23.0)	−7.5 (18.5)	−8.0 (17.6)
Average rainfall mm (inches)	75.5 (2.97)	52.1 (2.05)	29.6 (1.17)	53.1 (2.09)	63.3 (2.49)	21.8 (0.86)	6.6 (0.26)	5.0 (0.20)	37.1 (1.46)	78.4 (3.09)	110.5 (4.35)	110.8 (4.36)	643.8 (25.35)
Average precipitation days (≥ 0.1 mm)	10.2	7.6	6.1	9.1	8.9	3.4	1.6	1.6	5.5	9.3	10.3	11.0	84.6
Source: Instituto de Meteorologia

== Notable individuals ==
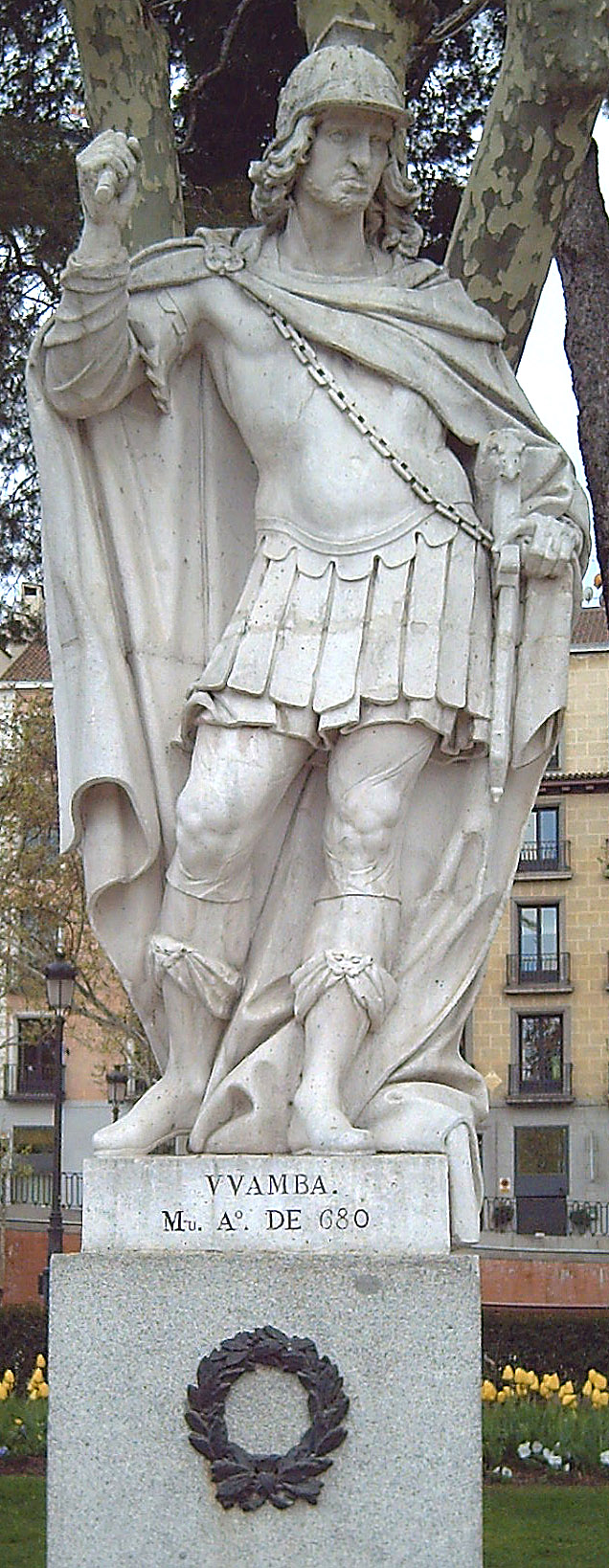
statue of King Wamba

Notable individuals of the municipality of Idanha-a-Nova include:

=== Olden times ===
- Pope Damasus I (ca.305 – 384) a Pope who was born in Egitânia or Vimaranes.
- Amador of Portugal hermit and saint, born in Monsanto.
- King Wamba (ca.643 – 687/688) Visigothic king, from 672 to 680; born in Egitânia (disputed).
- Roderic, Visigothic king in Hispania between 710 and 711, said to have been buried in Egitânia (disputed).

=== Modern times ===
- Teófilo Duarte (1898–1958) a colonial administrator, military officer and politician; supported the Estado Novo
- Manuel de Paiva Boléo (1904–1992) was a professor of Romance philology and Portuguese linguistics.
- Manuel d'Almeida Trindade (1918 in Monsanto – 2008) Bishop of Roman Catholic Diocese of Aveiro
- Luís Filipe de Castro Mendes (born 1950) Portuguese politician who served as Minister of Culture.

== See also ==
- Idanha-a-Velha
