= Monfortinho Airport =

- IATA: none; ICAO: LPMF

Summary
- Airport type: Public
- Serves: Monfortinho
- Elevation AMSL: 985 ft / 300 m
- Coordinates: 39°58′30″N 6°54′20″W

Map

Runways
Direction	Length		Surface
Direction	m	ft	Surface
17/35	845	2,772	Gravel
- Source: Google Maps GCM

Monfortinho Airport (ICAO: LPMF) is an airstrip near the Portugal-Spain border serving Monfortinho, in the Castelo Branco municipality of Portugal.

The runway is 3 kilometres (1.9 mi) southwest of the village.

== See also ==
- Transport in Portugal
- List of airports in Portugal
