= Gafanha da Encarnação =

- Civil parish
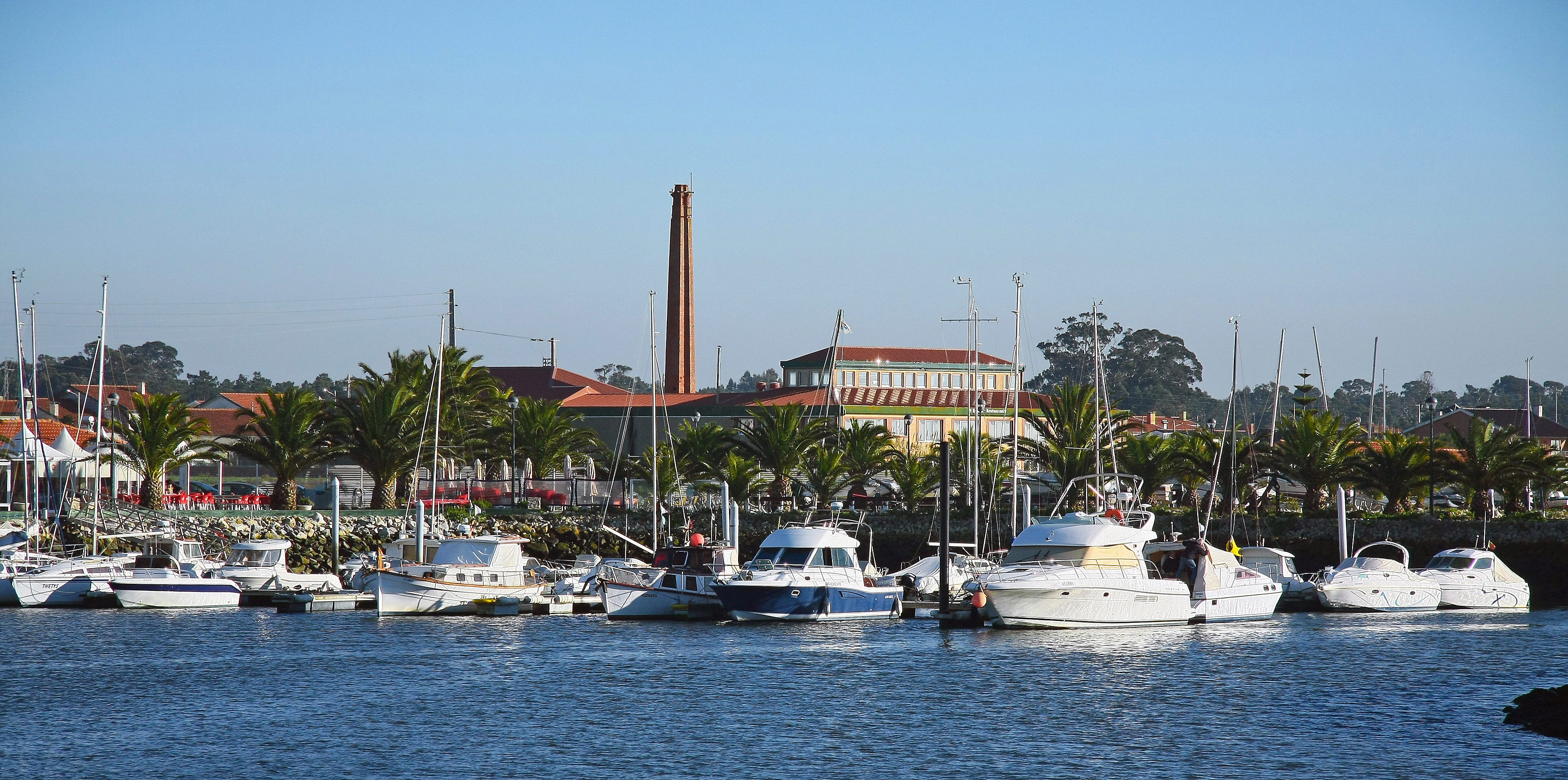

- Location in Portugal
- Coordinates: 40°35′07″N 8°44′41″W
- Country: Portugal
- Region: Centro
- Intermunic. comm.: Região de Aveiro
- District: Aveiro
- Municipality: Ílhavo

Area
  - Total: 10.98 km^{2} (4.24 sq mi)

Population (2011)
  - Total: 5,362
  - Density: 488.3/km^{2} (1,265/sq mi)
- Time zone: UTC+00:00 (WET)
  - Summer (DST): UTC+01:00 (WEST)

Gafanha da Encarnação is a village and a civil parish of the municipality of Ílhavo, Portugal. The population in 2011 was 5,362, in an area of 10.98 km^{2}.
