= Gafanha do Carmo =

- Civil parish
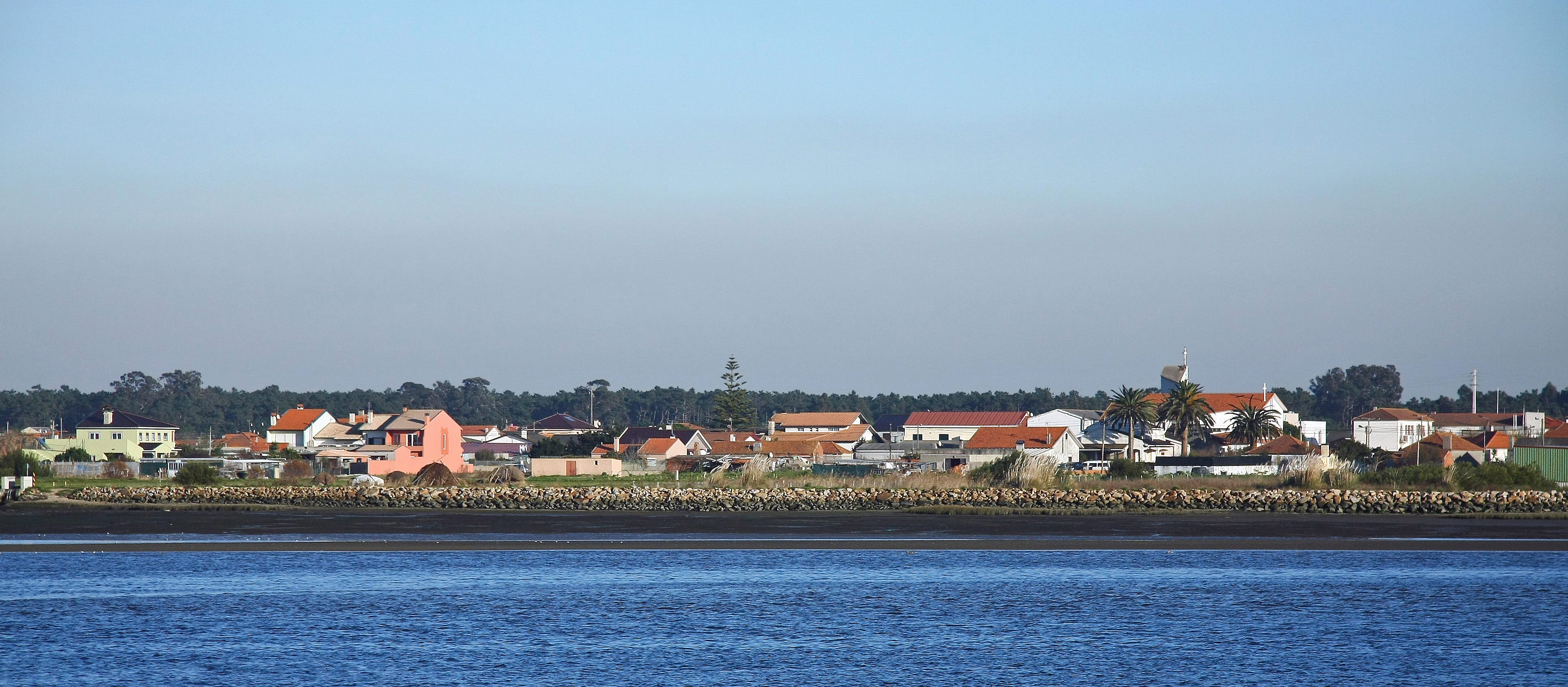

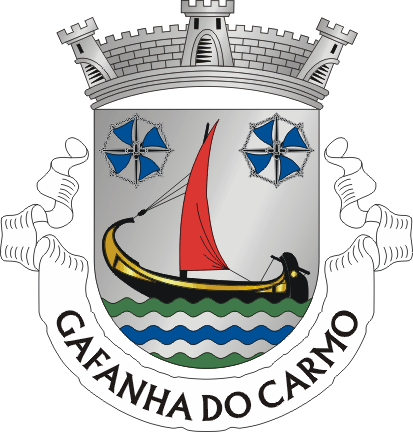
- Coat of arms

- Location in Portugal
- Coordinates: 40°35′07″N 8°44′41″W
- Country: Portugal
- Region: Centro
- Intermunic. comm.: Região de Aveiro
- District: Aveiro
- Municipality: Ílhavo

Area
  - Total: 7.05 km^{2} (2.72 sq mi)

Population (2011)
  - Total: 1,526
  - Density: 216/km^{2} (561/sq mi)
- Time zone: UTC+00:00 (WET)
  - Summer (DST): UTC+01:00 (WEST)
- Postal code: 3830 Gafanha do Carmo

Gafanha do Carmo is a civil parish of the municipality of Ílhavo, Portugal. The population in 2021 was 1691, in an area of 7.05 km^{2}.
