= Beira Baixa (intermunicipal community) =

- Intermunicipal community
- Logo

- Coordinates: 39.82°N 7.50°W
- Country: Portugal
- Region: Central Portugal
- Established: 2013
- Seat: Castelo Branco
- Municipalities: 6

Area
  - Total: 4,614.64 km^{2} (1,781.72 sq mi)

Population (2011)
  - Total: 89,063
  - Density: 19.300/km^{2} (49.987/sq mi)
- Time zone: UTC+00:00 (WET)
  - Summer (DST): UTC+01:00 (WEST)
- Website: www.cimbb.pt

The Comunidade Intermunicipal da Beira Baixa (Portuguese pronunciation: [ˈbɐjɾɐ ˈbajʃɐ]) is an administrative division in eastern Portugal. It was created in October 2013 out of the former Comunidade Intermunicipal da Beira Interior Sul, created in March 2009. Since January 2015, Beira Baixa is also a NUTS3 subregion of Centro Region, that covers the same area as the intermunicipal community. The seat of the intermunicipal community is Castelo Branco. Beira Baixa comprises a large part of the Castelo Branco District. The population in 2011 was 89,063, in an area of 4,614.64 km².

== Municipalities ==
The intermunicipal community of Beira Baixa consists of 8 municipalities:

Municipality	Population (2011)	Area (km²)
Castelo Branco	56,109	1438.19
Idanha-a-Nova	9,716	1416.34
Oleiros	5,721	471.09
Penamacor	5,682	563.71
Proença-a-Nova	8,314	395.40
Sertã		
Vila de Rei		
Vila Velha de Ródão	3,521	329.91
Total	89,063	4,614.64
