= Castelo Branco District =

District of Portugal

Coordinates: 39.824°N 7.492°W

District of Castelo Branco Distrito de Castelo Branco (Portuguese)
- District
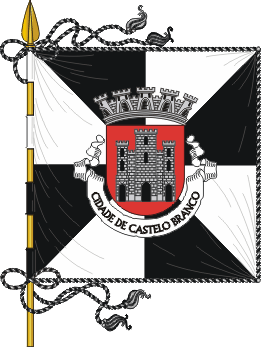
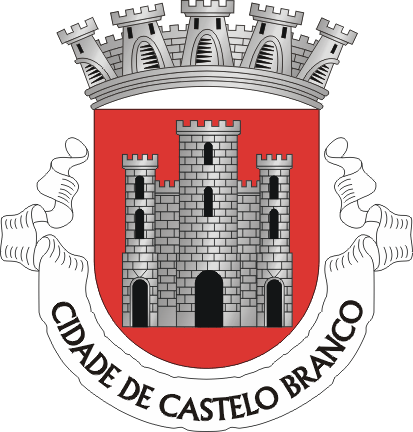
- Flag Coat of arms

- Country: Portugal
- Region: Centro
- Historical province: Beira Baixa
- No. of municipalities: 11
- No. of parishes: 128
- Capital: Castelo Branco

Area
  - Total: 6,675 km^{2} (2,577 sq mi)

Population (2011)
  - Total: 225,916
  - Density: 33.85/km^{2} (87.66/sq mi)
- ISO 3166 code: PT-05
- No. of parliamentary representatives: 4

Castelo Branco District (Portuguese: Distrito de Castelo Branco [kɐʃˈtɛlu ˈβɾɐ̃ku]) is located in Central Portugal. Its capital is Castelo Branco, which is now also its most populous city, overtaking Covilhã, which was once the largest city, in the late 2010s.

It has an area of 6,675 km^{2} (2,577 sq mi) (4th largest in Portugal), and a population of 225,916 inhabitants. It borders Spain (Extremadura).

== Municipalities ==
The district is composed of 11 municipalities:

- Belmonte
- Castelo Branco
- Covilhã
- Fundão
- Idanha-a-Nova
- Oleiros
- Penamacor
- Proença-a-Nova
- Sertã
- Vila de Rei
- Vila Velha de Ródão

== Summary of votes and seats won in national elections since 1976 ==
Summary of election results from Castelo Branco district, 1976-2022
Parties	%	S	%	S	%	S	%	S	%	S	%	S	%	S	%	S	%	S	%	S	%	S	%	S	%	S	%	S	%	S	%	S
Parties	1976		1979		1980		1983		1985		1987		1991		1995		1999		2002		2005		2009		2011		2015		2019		2022	
PS	36.4	3	27.8	2	30.3	2	37.1	3	18.5	1	22.4	2	32.4	2	53.2	3	51.6	3	46.1	3	56.0	4	41.0	2	34.8	2	38.9	2	40.9	3	47.7	3
PSD	22.6	2	In AD				30.6	2	31.2	3	52.1	4	51.8	3	32.1	2	32.0	2	38.3	2	26.7	1	29.8	2	37.9	2	In PàF		26.3	1	27.4	1
CDS-PP	19.9	2	In AD				13.2	1	9.6		4.7		3.9		7.2		6.3		7.1		5.3		8.4		9.6		In PàF		3.7		1.6	
AD			49.9	4	51.0	4																										
PRD									24.4	2	6.0																					
PàF																											35.3	2				
Total seats	7		6										5										4									
Source: Comissão Nacional de Eleições
