= August 1910 =

Month of 1910

<<	August 1910					>>
Su	Mo	Tu	We	Th	Fr	Sa
	1	2	3	4	5	6
7	8	9	10	11	12	13
14	15	16	17	18	19	20
21	22	23	24	25	26	27
28	29	30	31

The following events occurred in August 1910:

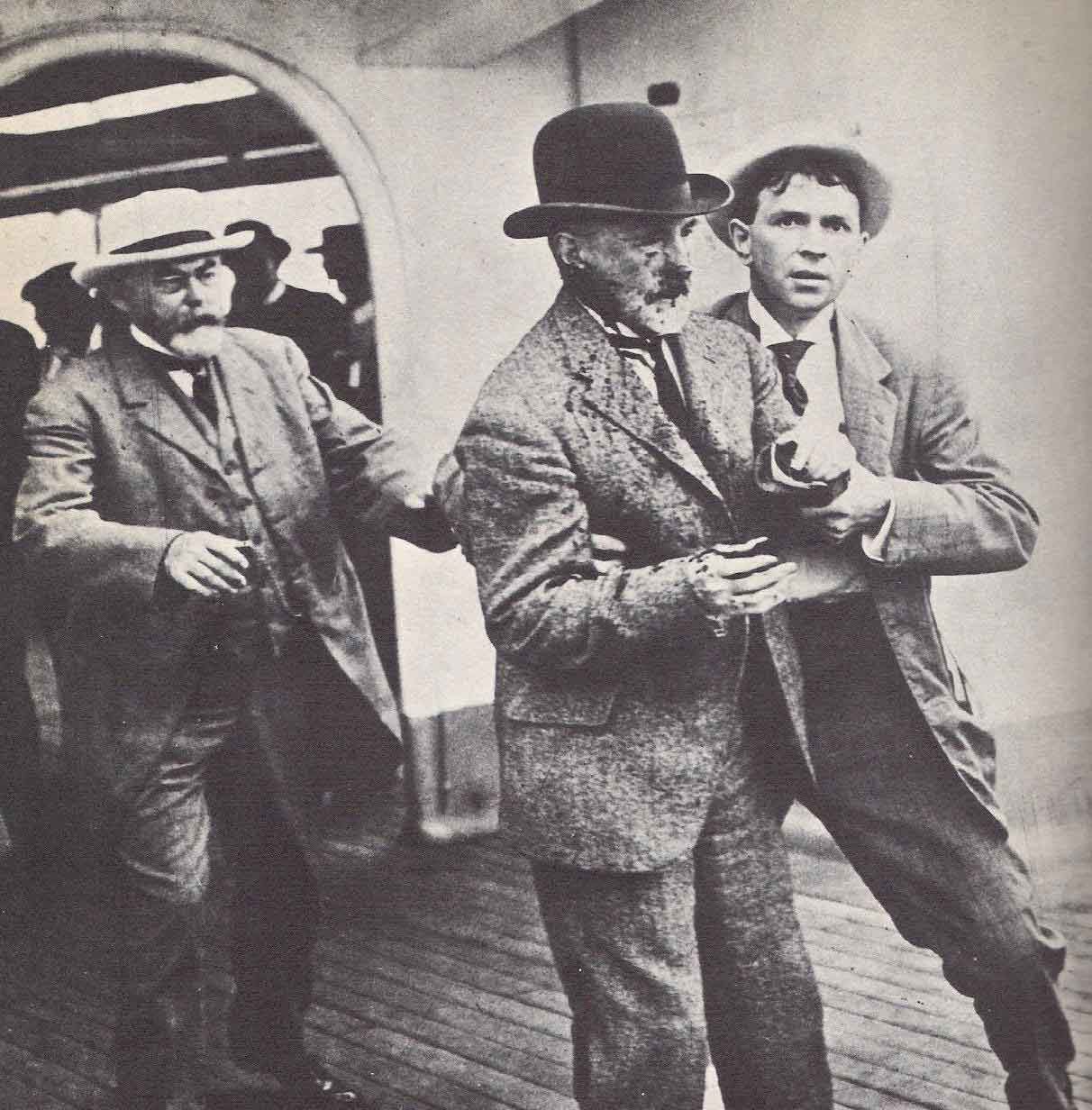
August 9, 1910: Mayor of New York City shot

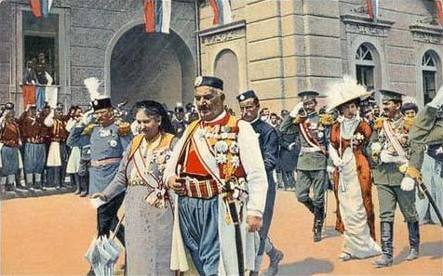
August 28, 1910: Nicholas I proclaims the Kingdom of Montenegro

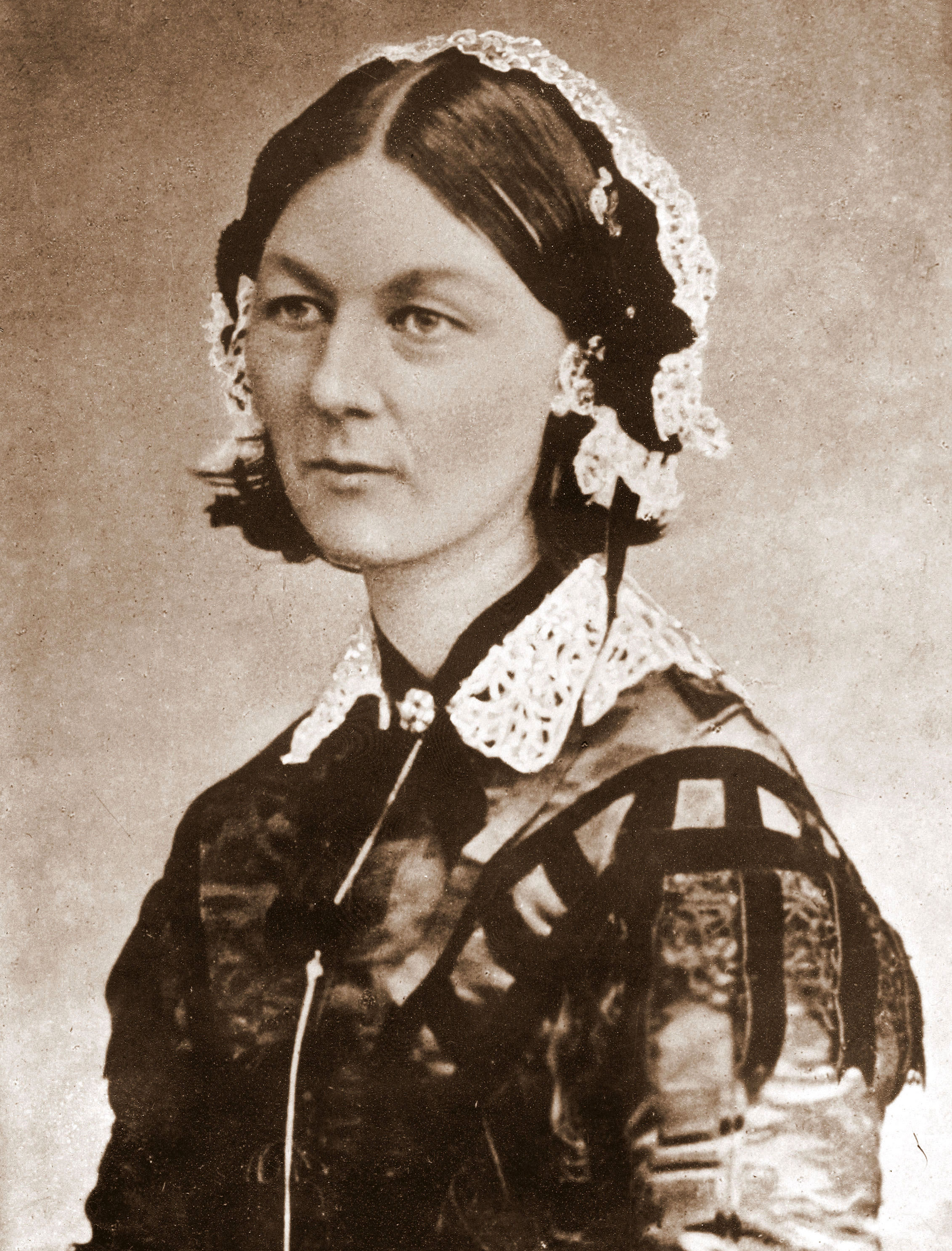
August 13, 1910: Florence Nightingale dies at 90

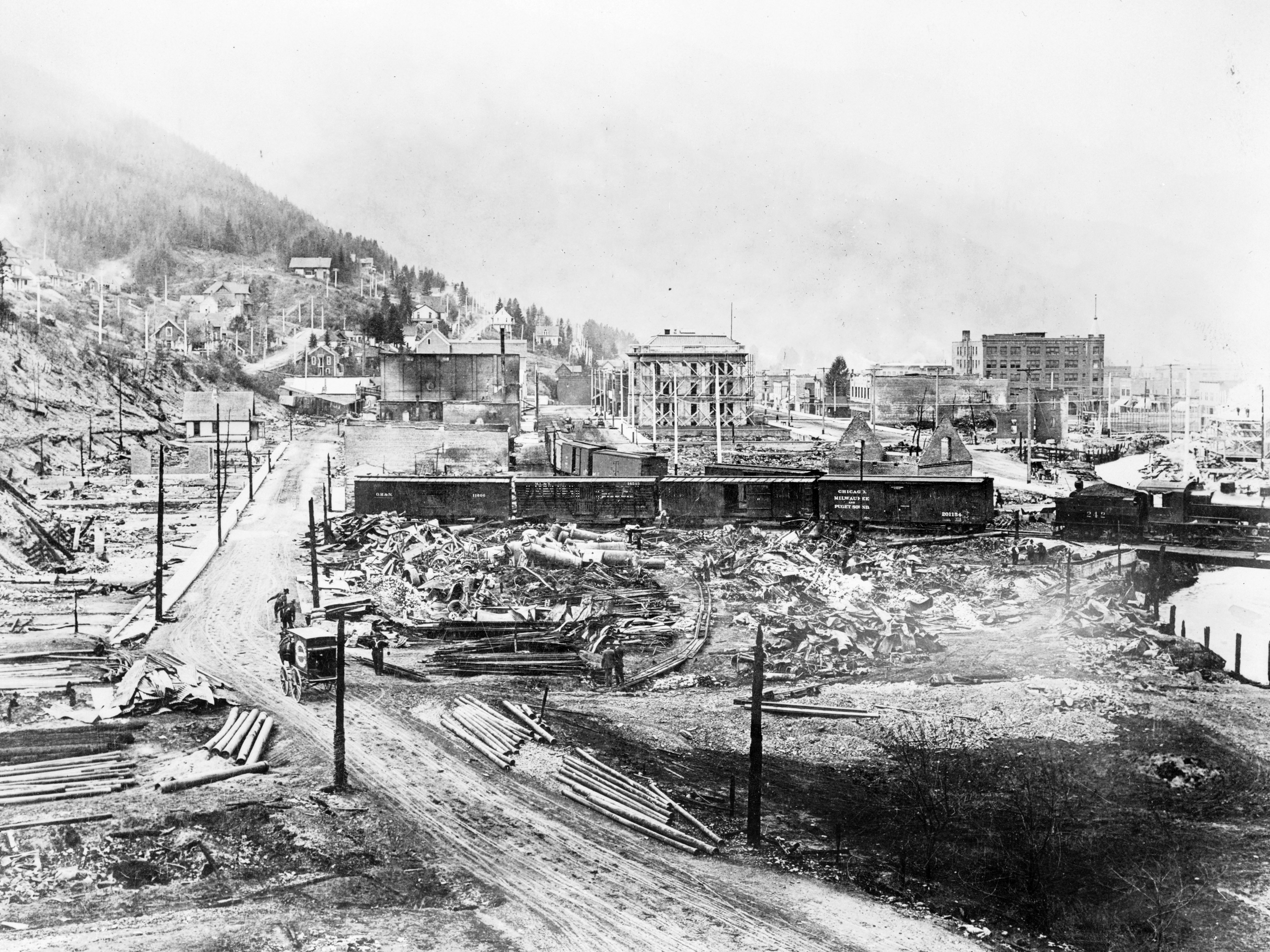
August 20, 1910: Fire destroys Wallace, Idaho and other towns across northwest United States

== August 1, 1910 (Monday) ==
- An aviator, known only as Monsieur Baeder, became the first pilot to carry three passengers in an airplane. The total weight lifted into the air was 700 pounds (320 kg). Baeder was killed nine days later, one of 53 aviators killed in the worst year for flying to that time.
- Thomas Wood, a 15-year-old boy in Sunderland, England, became the second person in history to be killed on the ground by an airplane. French aviator Mathilde Franck clipped a flagpole and her plane struck the crowd watching at the Boldon racecourse. On October 18, 1909, a woman in France had become the first such fatality.

== August 2, 1910 (Tuesday) ==
- Oklahoma's state constitution was amended to require literacy tests for all persons except descendants of persons who were free prior to the end of slavery, disenfranchising 30,000 African Americans.

== August 3, 1910 (Wednesday) ==
- The last of the United Kingdom's "Anti-Catholic Oaths", the 1672 Declaration of Attestation, was repealed by Act of Parliament and Royal Assent. The House of Commons had approved the legislation on July 27 by a vote of 410 to 84 and the House of Lords unanimously followed suit on August 2.

== August 4, 1910 (Thursday) ==
- Alexander Guchkov, Russia's highest-ranking legislator as President of the Duma, began a four-week jail sentence after being convicted of fighting a duel with opposition leader Count Uvaroff on November 30. He was released after five days.
- Born:
  - Anita Page, American silent film actress, as Anita Pomares in Flushing, Queens, New York City (d. 2008)
  - William Schuman, American classical music and opera composer, known for the 1950 Martha Graham ballet Judith, the libretto for The Mighty Casey (a 1953 operatic adaptation of "Casey at the Bat"); in Manhattan, New York City (d. 1992)

== August 5, 1910 (Friday) ==
- Flooding in and around Tokyo killed more than 1,000 people and left 100,000 homeless.
- Prime Minister of Canada Wilfrid Laurier was injured when the train he was on crashed head-on with a freight train. A crewmember was killed, while Laurier's injuries were described as minor.

== August 6, 1910 (Saturday) ==
- HMS Lion, first of the "super-Dreadnought" class of Royal Navy battlecruisers, was launched at Devonport. The largest warship to date, the Lion was 700 feet long.
- Brazil announced its intention to build the largest and most powerful battleship in history, the Rio de Janeiro. However, a downturn in the economy required Brazil to scale back its plans, and a smaller version of the ship was sold by Brazil to Turkey.
- Outside a café in Leiden, Netherlands, Gustav Mahler met Sigmund Freud, and they conversed for four hours, before parting forever. Their encounter would be dramatized a century later in the German documentary film Mahler on the Couch

== August 7, 1910 (Sunday) ==
- The government issued an ultimatum to the Mujahidin in Tehran to turn in their weapons on August 4, 1910, and government troops attacked the residence of Sattar Khan in Tehran on August 7, 1910. Government troops attacked the Mujahidin in Atabak Park (garden of the Atabak-i A’zam) in Tehran on August 7, 1910, resulting in the deaths of some 30 Mujahidin.
- Residents of Council Bluffs, Iowa, were shaken by the sight and impact of a large meteor that impacted near the town during the afternoon.
- Born: Lucien Hervé, Hungarian-born French photographer, as László Elkán, in Hódmezővásárhely (d. 2007)

== August 8, 1910 (Monday) ==
- Pope Pius X issued the papal edict Quam singulari, which specified that children could receive their First Communion at age 7.
- A project begun in 1903, to raise the city of Galveston, Texas, above sea level, was completed.
- A railroad collision at Ignacio, California, killed 13 people.
- The city of Bethany, Oklahoma, was incorporated.

== August 9, 1910 (Tuesday) ==
- William Jay Gaynor, the Mayor of New York City, was seriously wounded in an assassination attempt. Mayor Gaynor was preparing to board a liner for a European vacation, when a recently fired city employee shot him.
- The first commercially successful, automatic, washing machine, invented by Alva J. Fisher, was granted U.S. Patent No. 966,677. The "Thor" machine was marketed by the Hurley Machine Company.
- The Sungari agreement, between Russia and China, was signed at Beijing, with China giving up claims for free trade on the border between the two empires.
- Explorer Roald Amundsen departed Norway on what was announced as his third expedition to the North Pole. As it turned out, Amundsen and his crew were planning to race against Britain's Robert F. Scott to reach the South Pole.
- Died: Huo Yuanjia, 43, Chinese martial artist, subject of Jet Li film Fearless, died of hemoptysis

== August 10, 1910 (Wednesday) ==
- The first oil well in Malaysia began yielding oil. Located at Miri, on Sarawak, Shell Oil Well No. 1 produced 600,000 barrels of oil from 1910 to 1962.
- Fifteen separate persons were indicted for murder by a jury in Newark, Ohio, as the result of a lynching on July 8.
- Aviator Walter Brookins crashed into a crowd while flying in an airshow at Asbury Park, New Jersey, injuring eight people.
- Born: Aldo Buzzi, Italian author architect screenwriter, in Como (d. 2009)

== August 11, 1910 (Thursday) ==
- At the Pan-American Conference held in Buenos Aires, the participating nations voted to create a Pan-American Union, to be led by the U.S. Secretary of State.
- The boundaries between the Belgian Congo (now the Democratic Republic of Congo), and German East Africa (now part of Tanzania, Rwanda and Burundi) were established by a Belgian-German treaty.
- Robert Fox of Putney, England, was granted a U.K. Patent for "means of producing cinematograph effects ... by means of the motion of a railway carriage". Though never used, the system called for images on the side of underground subway tunnels, to be viewed in succession like frames on a film. A later commentator noted "Not quite flat-screen video panels, but a bold effort that had to wait almost a century to be realised."
- A military air base was established near Saint-Dizier, France.

== August 12, 1910 (Friday) ==
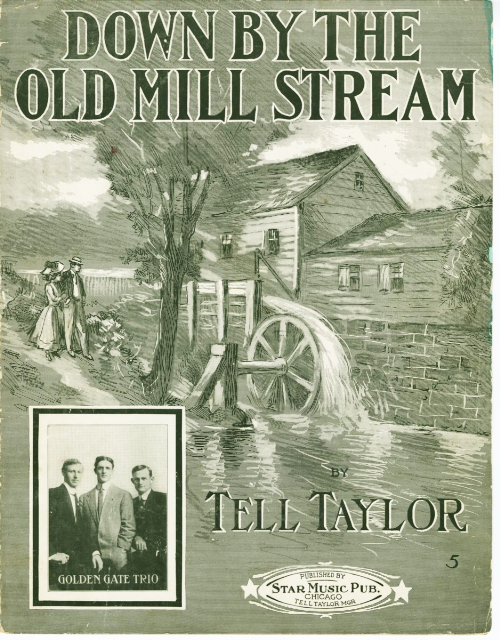
The hit song of 1910

- One of the most popular songs of the early 20th century, "Down by the Old Mill Stream", by Tell Taylor, was introduced by the Forster Music company, with 4,000,000 copies of the sheet music for the piano being sold. At the time, relatively few Americans purchased phonographs or recordings, and most new music was taken home to be played on the family piano.
- Uhlan became the first racehorse to run a mile in less than two minutes, running at 1 minute, 58 3/4 seconds at the North Randall racetrack near Cleveland. The prior world record had been 2:01.
- Born:
  - Yusof bin Ishak, the first President of Singapore, from 1965 to 1970, in Perak state (d. 1970)
  - Jane Wyatt, American film and TV actress best known for Father Knows Best; in Mahwah, New Jersey (d. 2006)

== August 13, 1910 (Saturday) ==
- What George F. Will has called the "baseball game of perfect symmetry" took place as the Brooklyn Superbas and the Pittsburgh Pirates played an 8–8 tie before the game was called for darkness. Each team had 8 runs, 13 hits, 2 errors, 12 assists, 5 strikeouts, 3 walks, one base hit, and one passed ball.
- Died: Florence Nightingale, 90, English founder of professional nursing

== August 14, 1910 (Sunday) ==
- A collision between an excursion train and a freight train, at Saujon, France, killed 37 people and injured 58 others.
- A fire at the World's Fair in Brussels destroyed the Belgian, English and French exhibition buildings and caused ten million dollars damage.
- Vaika Birds' Reserve was founded by Estonia on the Vilsandi.
- Dutch Zwilling, the last Major League Baseball player (alphabetically), made his major league debut, for the Chicago White Sox.
- Born: Pierre Schaeffer, French composer, in Nancy (d. 1995)
- Died:
  - Mayor William F. Robinson of El Paso, Texas, was killed, along with a fireman, when a wall at Calisher's Department Store collapsed during the blaze.

== August 15, 1910 (Monday) ==
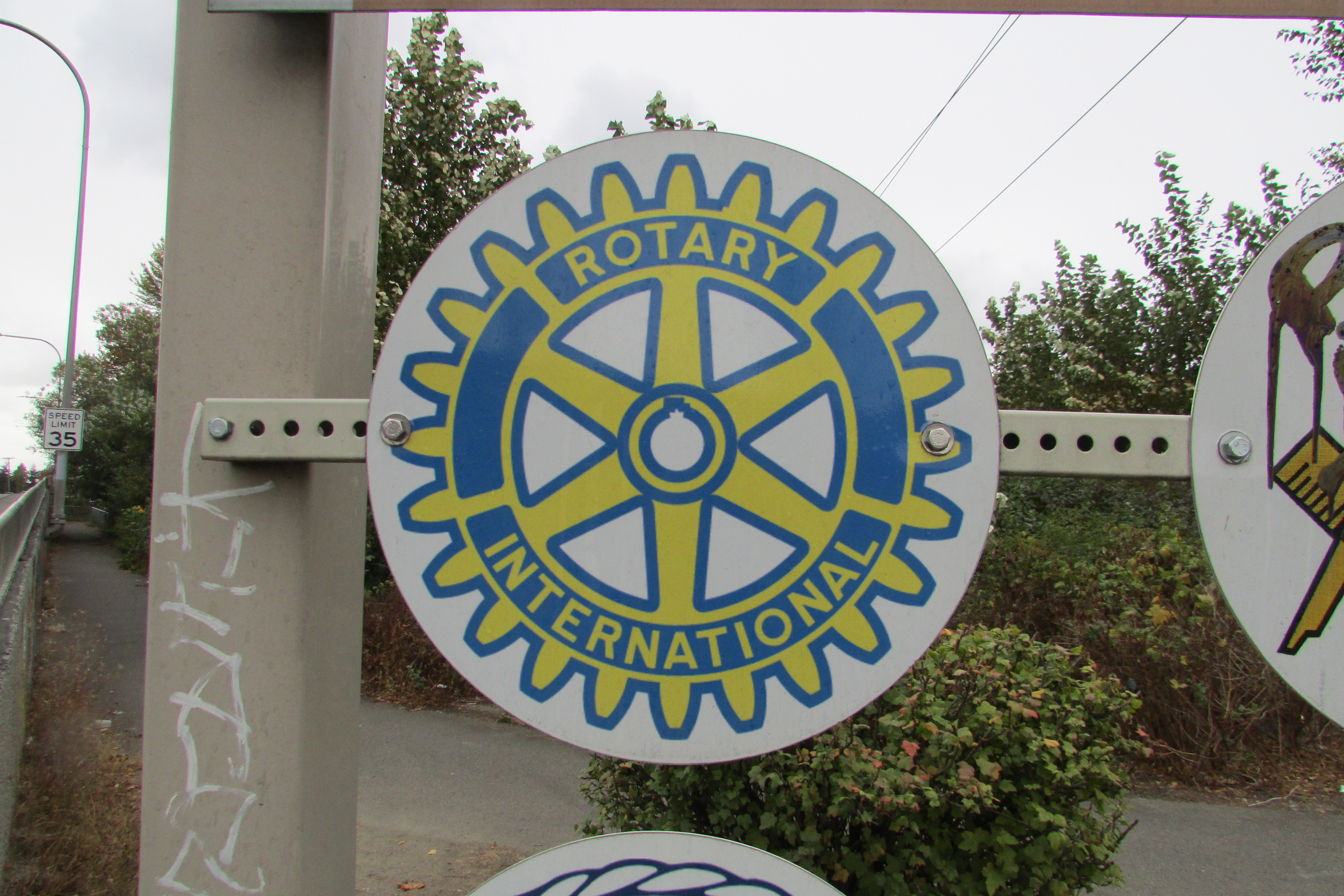
The Rotary International sign

- The National Association of Rotary Clubs was created at a convention in Chicago. At that time, there were 15 Rotary Clubs. A century later there would be more than 32,000 worldwide.
- Fifteen college registrars and nine college accountants gathered at Detroit and founded the American Association of College Registrars and Admissions Officers (AACRAO).

== August 16, 1910 (Tuesday) ==
- The Campbell Brothers Circus was traveling between towns on a train, when a passenger train crashed into it at Babcock, Wisconsin, at 8:30 in the morning. One man was killed, along with six camels, six ponies and two elephants. Another two elephants ran off into the woods before being recaptured. The event is commemorated by a historical marker at Babcock.
- Died: Pedro Montt Montt, the 15th President of Chile, died at the age of 64, a few hours after arriving in Bremen, Germany, on the liner Kaiser Wilhelm der Grosse. Elías Fernández Albano, who was sworn in to succeed Montt, died three weeks later on September 6.

== August 17, 1910 (Wednesday) ==
- Freiheit, a German-language anarchist newspaper which Johann Most had established on January 4, 1879, published its final issue. From 1882 until his death in 1906, Most published it weekly in the United States.
- George White made his Broadway debut as a vaudeville performer. Within nine years, he would become producer of his own star-studded Broadway revue, George White's Scandals, which would be the chief competitor against the Ziegfeld Follies during the 1920s and 1930s.

== August 18, 1910 (Thursday) ==
- Florists' Transworld Delivery, known at flower shops as FTD, was founded by fifteen flower shop owners in various cities, who inaugurated the first system of "wiring flowers", whereby a person in one city could arrange with one florist for the delivery of flowers, long distance, by another florist. In 1965, international deliveries began.
- Rickwood Field, the oldest professional baseball park in America, opened with 10,000 fans watching the minor league Birmingham Barons play a Southern League game. The park also hosted the Negro league Birmingham Black Barons between 1923 and 1960, while the SL Barons played there until 1987. The park continues to host one Barons' game each season, with the players wearing "throwback" uniforms.
- The 80th birthday of His Imperial and Royal Apostolic Majesty, Francis Joseph I, Emperor of Austria and King of Hungary, was celebrated throughout Austria-Hungary.

== August 19, 1910 (Friday) ==
- Annexation of Canada's provinces by the United States was advocated by Canadian M.P. Henri Bourassa in an address delivered at St. Francis Xavier University in Nova Scotia. Bourassa said that such a merger was more favorable than continuing the British Dominion, federation within the British Empire, or complete independence.
- An epidemic of cholera had killed 10,723 people in Russia during the week of August 7–13, according to a government announcement made in St. Petersburg, although Red Cross officials said that the actual numbers were probably higher.
- Born: Alphonsa Muttathupadathu, Indian Roman Catholic saint canonized in 2008; in Kudamaloor, princely state of Travancore, British India (now the state of Kerala (d. 1946)

== August 20, 1910 (Saturday) ==
- The largest forest fire in American history when several smaller fires in Washington, Oregon, Idaho and Montana were swept by winds to combine into a massive conflagration that killed at least 160 people in four days. Rain dampened the fires on August 23.
- Nicaragua's President, José Madriz, resigned and conceded defeat by American-backed rebels led by General Juan José Estrada. The General's brother, José Dolores Estrada, became acting President, followed by Luis Mena, until General Estrada could arrive in Managua on August 30.
- The first gunshots, ever fired from an airplane, were made by Lieutenant James Fickel. As pilot Glenn Curtiss brought his airplane down to 100 feet over the Sheepshead Bay Race Track in New York, Fickel shot a rifle at a target.
- The Royal Navy battleship HMS Orion was launched.
- Born: Eero Saarinen, Finnish architect; in Kirkkonummi (d. 1961)

== August 21, 1910 (Sunday) ==
- Eighteen British sailors died when the cruiser HMS Bedford ran aground near the Korea's Quelpart Island (now called Jeju-do).
- The Navy of the Ottoman Empire acquired its first battleships. The Barbaros and the Turgut Reis were purchased from Germany after the Ottomans were unable to acquire a dreadnought-class ship.
- In fiction, this date is the setting for the 1981 Spanish film El crimen de Cuenca, directed by Pilar Miró.

== August 22, 1910 (Monday) ==
- In Seoul, the Japan–Korea Annexation Treaty was signed by Yi Wan-Yong, Prime Minister of Korea, on behalf of the Emperor of Korea, and by the Japanese Resident-General, Terauchi Masatake, on behalf of the Emperor of Japan, with the provision that "on August 29, 1910, the Imperial Government of Japan shall undertake the entire government and administration of Korea". One week later, Korea's status as an independent nation was changed to the Japanese territory of Cho-Sen, with Terauchi as Governor-General.

== August 23, 1910 (Tuesday) ==
- A rift between U.S. President William H. Taft and U.S. Vice-President James S. Sherman, described in the New York Times as "without a parallel in the history of the relations between the two highest Government officials", threatened to split the Republican Party during mid-year elections. The occasion was the public revelation of Taft's criticism of Sherman, in a letter to a New York City party chief Lloyd Griscom. Roosevelt "blacked Jim Sherman's other eye" by telling reporters that he was "very much pleased with Mr. Taft's statement."

== August 24, 1910 (Wednesday) ==
- The Indian Tobacco Company, which became the conglomerate ITC Limited, the third largest corporation in India, was incorporated in Kolkata.

== August 25, 1910 (Thursday) ==
- At a speech in Königsberg, Kaiser Wilhelm II of Germany reaffirmed his belief in the divine right of kings. After saying that his grandfather had received the Prussian crown "by God's grace alone and not by Parliaments, assemblages of the people, or resolutions of the people", and then described himself as "the instrument of the Master"
- Born: Dorothea Tanning, American artist; in Galesburg, Illinois (d. 2012)

== August 26, 1910 (Friday) ==
- Thomas Edison gave the first demonstration of the kinetophone, synchronizing the sound from a phonographic record to a kinetoscope motion picture. The press conference, at West Orange, New Jersey, showed a man walking "and as his lips moved, the sound of his voice issued from the concealed phonograph". The New York Times added "This was all that Mr. Edison would show."
- Born: Mother Teresa, Albanian nun turned India humanitarian, Nobel Peace Prize 1979; as Agnesë Gonxhe Bojaxhiu in Üsküb (now Skopje) (d. 1997)
- Died: William James, 68, American pioneering psychologist (b. 1842)

== August 27, 1910 (Saturday) ==
- The first wireless transmission from an airplane took place at the track at Sheepshead Bay Race Track in Brooklyn. Pilot J.B. McCurdy, who had a telegraphic key on the steering wheel of his airplane, and a 50-foot antenna trailing the plane, repeatedly sent a 17-word message to H.M. Horton, whose receiver was located in the grandstand of the racetrack. The range for the first experiment was two miles.
- Luis Mena became Acting President of Nicaragua, serving for two days until General Juan José Estrada took office.

== August 28, 1910 (Sunday) ==
- The Kingdom of Montenegro was created at 7:30 a.m. in Cetinje, when Prince Nikola Petrović-Njegoš was proclaimed by Parliament (the Skupština) as King Nicholas I. King Nicholas I was the nation's only monarch, and Montenegro became part of The Kingdom of Yugoslavia from 1918 until 1992.
- The National Billiard League was founded in Kansas City, with Chicago Cubs catcher Johnny Kling as its President. Franchises were placed in Kansas City, Philadelphia, Chicago, St. Louis, Pittsburgh, Boston, New York, Brooklyn and Cincinnati.
- Born: Tjalling Koopmans, Dutch economics expert and 1975 Nobel laureate; in 's-Graveland (d. 1985)

== August 29, 1910 (Monday) ==
- The Emperor Sunjong of Korea signed his final Imperial Rescript as the Japan–Korea Annexation Treaty took effect, bringing an end to Korea's independence. Korea became Japanese territory, taking on the Japanese name of Chosen. Terauchi Masatake, on behalf of Japan's Emperor, assumed the title of Governor-General of Chosen. New Japanese names for Korean cities included Keijō (for Seoul) and Heijō (for Pyongyang).
- Louis Breguet became the first pilot to carry five passengers in an airplane. The combined weight of the six persons contributed to a total weight of 921 pounds in the flight at Lisle, France.
- General Juan José Estrada, leader of the rebellion against Nicaragua's government, took office in Managua. He was the nation's fourth President in a ten-day period.
- Died: Muhammad Rahim Khan II, 65, ruler of the Khanate of Khiva since 1864. He was succeeded by his son, Isfandiyar Khan, who would rule until 1918.

== August 30, 1910 (Tuesday) ==
- The 13th annual Inter-Parliamentary Union Conference, opened with 768 delegates from 19 national legislatures at the Union's headquarters at the Palais de la Nation in Brussels, composed of current and former members of the parliaments of different nations. The nations represented were Austria-Hungary, Belgium, Denmark, France, Germany, Italy, Japan, Norway, Portugal, Romania, Sweden, Switzerland, Turkey, the United Kingdom, and the United States.
- The worst domestic terrorism, since a streetcar worker strike had started on July 24 in Columbus, Ohio, injured seven people in three separate incidents, and wrecked three streetcars. The first occurred when a streetcar ran over dynamite planted at the intersection of Main Street and Grand Avenue, hurting two businessmen. Another blast at Long Street and Monroe Avenue hurt the conductor and a passenger, and a third at Broad Street and Sandusky Street hurt two women passengers and a bystander.
- Born: Clarence Gideon, plaintiff in Gideon v. Wainwright (1963), which established the principle of the right for all criminal defendants in the United States to have an attorney, in Hannibal, Missouri (d. 1972)

== August 31, 1910 (Wednesday) ==
- Woolworth's opened a "Refreshment Room" in its store on 14th Street in New York City, serving meals to department store customers for the first time. The idea was duplicated in Lancaster, Pennsylvania and then (as a lunch counter) in other Woolworth's stores, creating the first restaurant chain. Karen Plunkett-Powell, Remembering Woolworth's: A Nostalgic History of the World's Most Famous Five-and-dime (St. Martin's Griffin, 1999) p. 151
- Former U.S. President Theodore Roosevelt delivered a speech in Osawatomie, Kansas, in which he unveiled "New Nationalism", a liberal policy that would become the focus of his bid to recapture the presidency in the 1912 elections.
- Gafanha da Nazaré was founded by Prior Sardo, becoming the last Portuguese town to receive a foral (royal charter) from the monarchy, granted by King Manuel II.
