= September 1910 =

Month of 1910

<<	September 1910					>>
Su	Mo	Tu	We	Th	Fr	Sa
				1	2	3
4	5	6	7	8	9	10
11	12	13	14	15	16	17
18	19	20	21	22	23	24
25	26	27	28	29	30

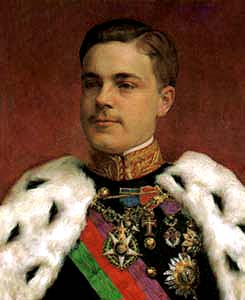
September 23, 1910: The last hurrah for King Manuel II of Portugal

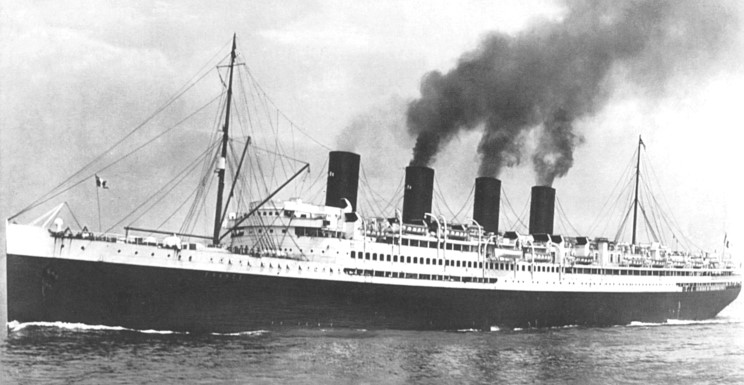
September 20, 1910: SS France launched

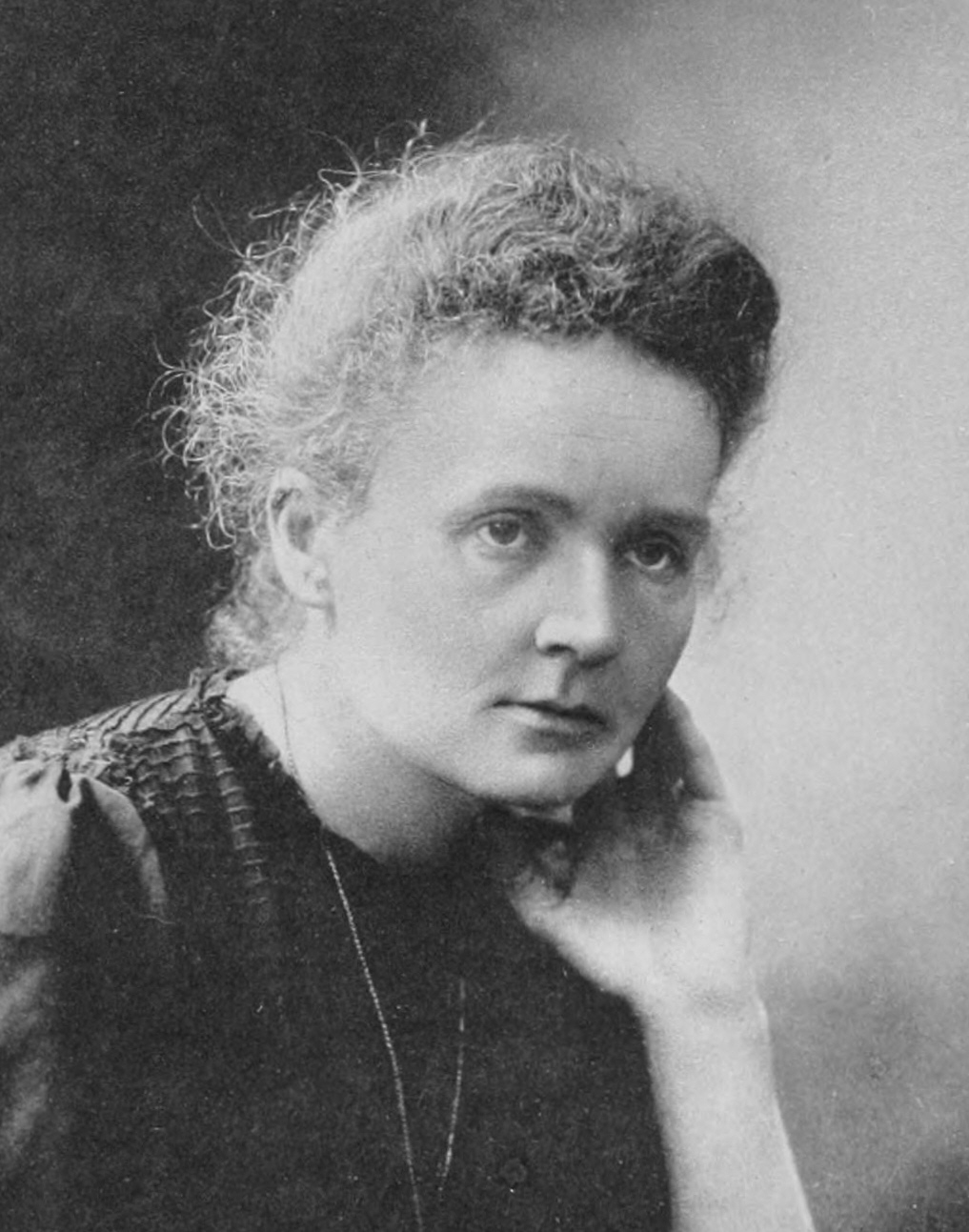
September 5, 1910: Marie Curie announces radium breakthrough

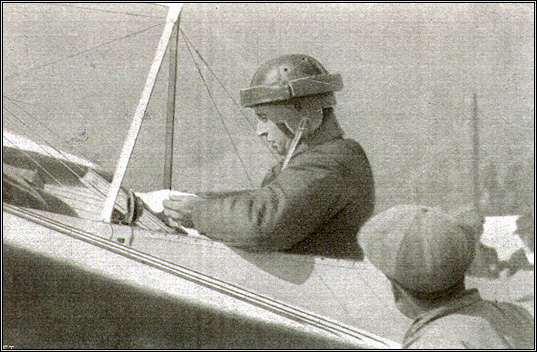
September 23, 1910: Jorge Chavez of Peru becomes first to fly over the Alps, suffers fatal injury on landing

The following events occurred in September 1910:

== September 1, 1910 (Thursday) ==
- Pope Pius X promulgated the Sacrorum antistitum (Oath against Modernism) and directed that all Roman Catholic bishops, priests and teachers take an oath against the Modernist movement, which called for a departure from following traditional teachings of the Church. The requirement was mandatory until 1967.
- The Mormon Tabernacle Choir's music was recorded commercially for the first time. The choir's records and CDs have sold millions of copies since then.
- Sport Club Corinthians Paulista, one of the most successful soccer football clubs in Brazil was founded in Tatuape, São Paulo. Corinthians has won seven Brazilian national titles as well as two championships of the FIFA Club World Cup, in 2000 and 2012.

== September 2, 1910 (Friday) ==
- The strike of 70,000 of New York's garment workers ended after nine weeks and an estimated $100,000,000 worth of losses secondary to the strike. The major concession won was that each manufacturer was required to have a union shop, and a guarantee of a 50-hour work week—9 hours a day for five days, followed by a 5-hour day.
- Blanche Stuart Scott (1889–1970) became the first American woman to make a solo flight in an airplane, taking off from Hammondsport, New York, after two days of instruction by Glenn Curtiss.
- Died: Henri Rousseau, 66, French post-Impressionist painter

== September 3, 1910 (Saturday) ==
- The boll weevil, an insect which had destroyed cotton crops since first entering the United States from Mexico, in 1892, was first detected in Alabama, where cotton production was, at the time, the main industry. The destruction of cotton farming forced farmers to diversify to other crops that, ultimately, were much more profitable—so much so that the citizens of Enterprise, Alabama, erected a monument to the pest in 1919.
- Born:
  - Maurice Papon, French government minister until 1981, later convicted of crimes against humanity; in Gretz-Armainvilliers (d. February 17, 2007)
  - Kitty Carlisle (stage name for Catherine Conn), American actress and game show panelist; in New Orleans (d. April 17, 2007)
  - Fránz Jachym, Austrian Roman Catholic bishop (d. 1984)

== September 4, 1910 (Sunday) ==
- Two time-bombs, fashioned from an alarm clock, a detonator and nitroglycerine, exploded in a railroad yard and at a bridge in Peoria, Illinois. A third bomb, which had failed to explode, was discovered later. The explosions proved to be a test run for a deadly attack in Los Angeles at the headquarters of the Los Angeles Times.

== September 5, 1910 (Monday) ==
- Marie Curie announced to the French Academy of Sciences at the Sorbonne that she had found a process to isolate pure radium from its naturally occurring salt, radium chloride, making large scale production of the rare element feasible.

== September 6, 1910 (Tuesday) ==
- Voters in the New Mexico territory selected 68 Republicans and 32 Democrats as delegates for a convention to write a state constitution.
- Nicaragua's new President, General Juan Jose Estrada, announced the release of political prisoners and the promise to pay government troops.
- The Tallis Fantasia, a classical piece by British composer Ralph Vaughan Williams, was first performed. Vaughan Williams had drawn inspiration from a melody by 16th century composer Thomas Tallis. The melodies continue to be popular in film scores, including The Passion of the Christ.
- Died: Elías Fernández Albano, 65, who had become President of Chile three weeks earlier on the death of President Pedro Montt. Fernandez was succeeded by Emiliano Figueroa

== September 7, 1910 (Wednesday) ==
- At The Hague, the International Court of Justice resolved the North Atlantic Fisheries Dispute, which had existed for more than 25 years between the United States on one side, and the United Kingdom, Canada and Newfoundland on the other.
- Died:
  - George W. Weymouth, 60, American businessman and former Congressman (R-Massachusetts), in an auto accident
  - William Holman Hunt, 83, English painter
  - Dr. Emily Blackwell, 83, second American woman to earn an M.D.

== September 8, 1910 (Thursday) ==
- Manhattan and Long Island were linked by subway as the East River Tunnels opened at ten minutes after midnight.
- The city of Mirassol, Brazil, was incorporated as São Pedro da Mata Una.
- Three coal passers were killed in a steam accident aboard the battleship USS North Dakota (BB-29). Six other crewmembers would each receive the Medal of Honor for their heroism during the incident.

== September 9, 1910 (Friday) ==
- The car ferry Pere Marquette No. 18 was midway across Lake Michigan when it suddenly began taking on water. Because the ferries had been equipped with wireless radio, operator Stephen F. Sczepanek was able to call Pere Marquette No. 17 for assistance. While the ship was being evacuated, it suddenly sank, taking with it 29 people, including Sczepanek and two passengers, but another 33 were saved.
- U.S. Treasury Secretary Franklin MacVeagh outlined a plan to first proposal cut the size of United States currency, from 3 in. by 7 1/4 to 2 1/2 by 6 inches. The size of American banknotes would not be changed until 1929, to the present size of 2.61 by 6.14 inches)

== September 10, 1910 (Saturday) ==
- With his two-year-old corporation facing bankruptcy, General Motors Chairman William C. Durant met with financiers at the Chase Manhattan Bank in New York, seeking a $15 million loan (comparable to $300,000,000 in 2010) to keep the company afloat. The bankers were at first unwilling to lend. At 4:00 pm, they listened to Wilfred Leland's account of the success of Cadillac, one of the GM component companies, and agreed to talk further. Ultimately, GM received the loan and avoided bankruptcy until June 1, 2009.

== September 11, 1910 (Sunday) ==
- The largest oil strike, up to that time, in Mexico's history was realized at the Juan Casiano Basin near Tampico. A gusher erupted at Casiano No. 7 at Edward L. Doheny's Mexican Petroleum Company, producing 60,000 barrels per day, and was the beginning of a new era in which Mexico would become a major oil producer.
- Nicaragua's new President, Juan José Estrada, announced that promised elections would not take place for a year.
- A cave-in of the old Erie Railroad Tunnel in Jersey City, New Jersey, killed 11 workers and injured seven others.

== September 12, 1910 (Monday) ==
- Physicist William David Coolidge discovered a method of creating ductile tungsten after four years of research at General Electric, making the fragile substance useful for light bulb filaments.
- Alice Stebbins Wells (1873–1957), first American policewoman in Los Angeles, and perhaps the United States, was sworn in as an LAPD officer. She was initially assigned to the Juvenile Probation unit and retired in 1945. Other sources point to Lola Greene Baldwin, who had been sworn in by the city of Portland, Oregon, "to perform police service", though not as an officer.
- Mahler's Symphony No. 8, often called Symphony of a Thousand because of the large number of performers required, was first presented. Composer Gustav Mahler himself conducted the first performance, in Munich.
- Fresno City College, the second oldest community college in the United States and the first in California, began its first classes.
- Our Lady of Victory College, located in Fort Worth, Texas, began its first classes, with 72 students, and continued operation for 47 years. In 1958, the junior college became part of the University of Dallas.
- Born: Shep Fields (stage name for Saul Friedman), American big band musician, leader of Shep Fields and His Rippling Rhythm; in Brooklyn (d. 1981)

== September 13, 1910 (Tuesday) ==
- Inayat Khan began travels as a missionary to spread the religion of Sufism to the Western world, sailing from Mumbai to Europe and North America. The International Sufi Movement marks Inayat Khan's mission as the beginning of the organization.
- The village of Lampman, Saskatchewan was incorporated.

== September 14, 1910 (Wednesday) ==
- The Fourth District State Agricultural School, later Arkansas A & M, and now the University of Arkansas at Monticello, began instructing its first students.
- Thorp Spring Christian College held its first classes. The college, located at Thorp Spring in Hood County, Texas, closed in 1929.
- Pablo Arosemena was chosen as the designado to the office of President of Panama, succeeding the late José Domingo de Obaldía.
- Born:
  - Jack Hawkins, English film actor, in Wood Green, Middlesex (d. 1973)
  - Bernard Schriever, German-born American rocket scientist; in Bremen (d. 2005)

== September 15, 1910 (Thursday) ==
- The first elections for the new parliament of the Union of South Africa were held, with the Nationalist Party obtaining 67 of the 121 seats.
- Woodrow Wilson, the President of Princeton University, was nominated for his first political office, as the convention of the Democratic Party of New Jersey selected him as its candidate for Governor of New Jersey. In 1912, Governor Wilson would be elected President of the United States.

== September 16, 1910 (Friday) ==
- The patent application for the first outboard motor was filed. Ole Evinrude, a native of Norway who settled in the United States at Cambridge, Wisconsin, had created a "marine propulsion mechanism", a portable motor that could transform a rowboat into a power boat. U.S. Patent No. 1,001,260 would be granted on August 22, 1911.
- Bessica Medlar Raiche made the first accredited solo airplane flight by a woman in the United States, flying from Hempstead Plains in New York, two weeks after Blanche Stuart Scott's "accidental" solo flight.

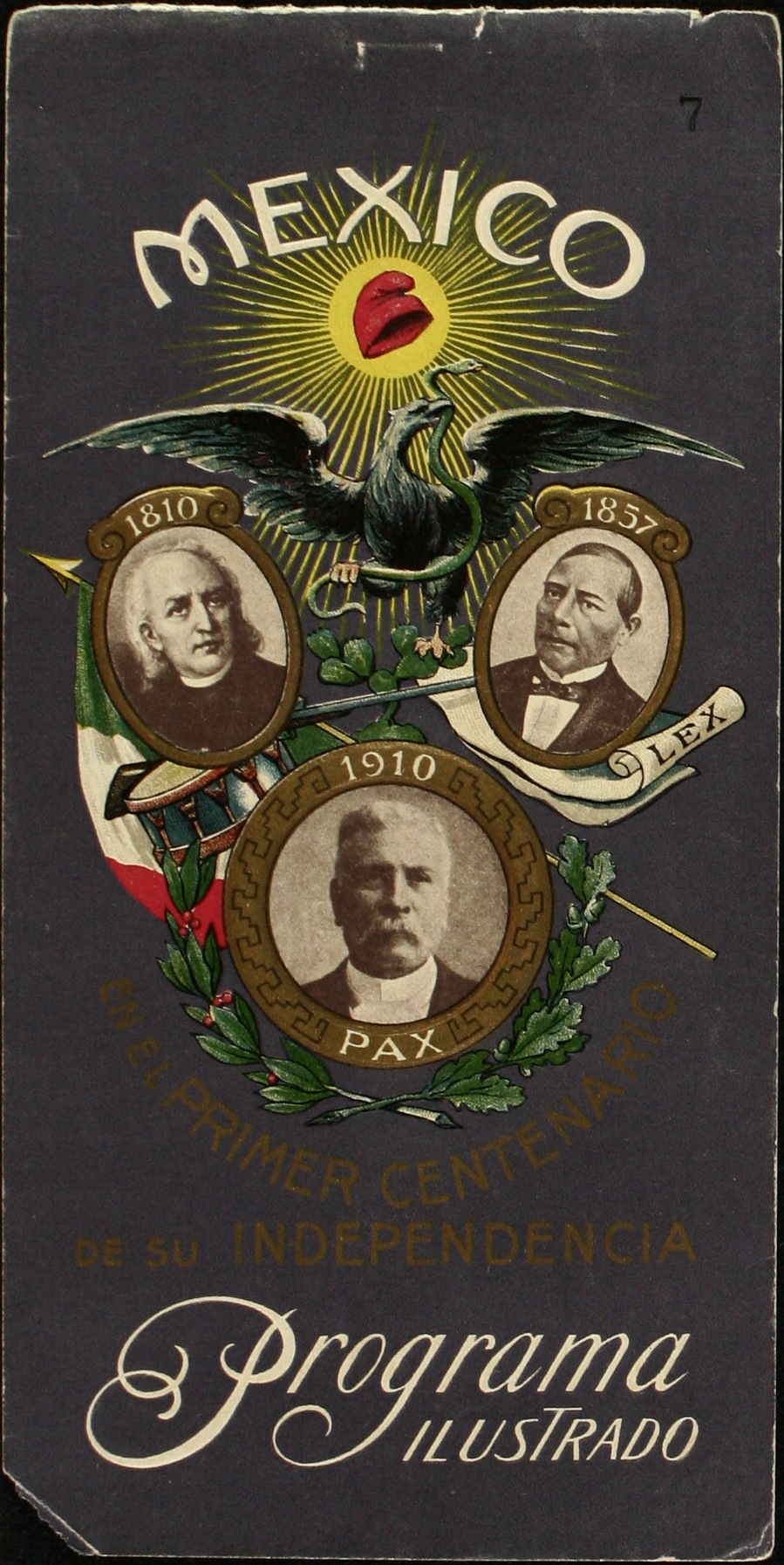
Illustrated program of the official centennial festivities of Mexican Independence over 30 days in September 1910.

- Mexico celebrated the centennial of its independence.
- Born:
  - Karl Kling, German automobile driver and Formula One racer in the 1950s, in Gießen (d. 2003)
  - Lt. Col. Erich Kempka, German automobile driver who was Adolf Hitler's chauffeur from 1934 to 1945, in Oberhausen (d. 1975)
- Died: Hormuzd Rassam, 84, Iraqi archaeologist

== September 17, 1910 (Saturday) ==
- The fastest professional baseball game in history took place in a Southern Association game in Atlanta. The Mobile Sea Gulls beat the Atlanta Crackers, 2–1, in a nine-inning game that was concluded 32 minutes after it started.
- By a margin of 198 to 120, voters in Crosby County, Texas, effectively turned the county seat of Emma into a ghost town, moving the county's courts and offices to Crosbyton, Texas. The county courthouse had moved from Estacado to Emma in 1891 by a 109–103 vote. According to the Texas State Historical Association, "A Texas historical marker on State Highway 207 twenty-five miles east of Lubbock is all that remains to mark the site of Emma, the once thriving county seat of Crosby County."

== September 18, 1910 (Sunday) ==
- U.S. Army Brigadier General George Owen Squier demonstrated the first system to allow multiplexing of telephone transmissions, allowing multiple telephone conversations to be transmitted on the same wires, where only one at a time could be made previously.
- Chile celebrated the centennial of its independence from Spain.

== September 19, 1910 (Monday) ==
- In Chicago, recently paroled burglar Thomas Jennings broke into a house, killed owner Clarence Hiller, then fled the scene—but not before leaving his fingerprints in the home. Jennings would become the first American to be executed based primarily on fingerprint evidence. Fingerprint evidence had first been used in a murder conviction in 1905 in the United Kingdom, with Alfred and Albert Stratton being hanged for a double murder.

== September 20, 1910 (Tuesday) ==
- The SS France, the largest French ocean liner to that time (713 feet long, 24,000 tons and capacity for 2,026 people) was launched. It was the third fastest liner in the world, second only to the Lusitania and the Mauretania.
- West Texas A&M University, at the time called West Texas State Normal College, began its first classes, with 152 students beginning instruction at the campus in Canyon, Texas.
- Thomas Edison applied for a U.S. patent (granted as No. 970,616) on a helicopter of his own invention. The machine was never manufactured.

== September 21, 1910 (Wednesday) ==
- The collision of two interurban streetcars near Kingsland, Indiana, killed 42 people.

== September 22, 1910 (Thursday) ==
- The Canadian Public Health Association was created, and began as its first order of business a nationwide campaign to vaccinate every child in the nation against smallpox.
- Hannah Shapiro, an 18-year-old seamstress at the Hart Schaffner & Marx factory in Chicago, led a walkout after the company announced a cut in the piecework rate. At first, only 16 women went on strike, but by October, 40,000 garment workers joined in a work stoppage that would last for five months.
- Died: Azud el-Mulk, 72, Regent for the Ahmad Shah Qajar, 12-year-old Shah of Persia.

== September 23, 1910 (Friday) ==
- Jorge Chávez Dartnell of Peru became the first person to fly an airplane over the Alps, crossing from Switzerland to Italy in 41 minutes, and winning the Milan Committee prize. Sadly, Chavez was fatally injured when his plane crashed while he was gliding in for a landing at Domodossola, and he would die four days later.
- Portugal's Cortes was opened by King Manuel II, but quickly adjourned when the eligibility of almost half of the elected membership was challenged. Within two weeks, the monarchy was overthrown and a republic was declared.
- In California, the Loma Linda Medical College began instruction for its first class of students, graduating its first physicians in 1914.
- Born: Elliott Roosevelt, son of Franklin and Eleanor Roosevelt, who later wrote biographies of both, as well as mystery novels, in Hyde Park, New York (d. 1990).

== September 24, 1910 (Saturday) ==
- The National Council in Persia elected Nasir-el-Mulk as the new regent for the 12-year old Shah, Ahmad Shah Qajar, by a 40–29 margin over Mostowfi ol-Mamalek.

== September 25, 1910 (Sunday) ==
- The future site of the University of British Columbia was selected by a commission, which chose Point Grey, outside of Vancouver, over Nelson, Kamloops, Vernon and Port Alberni.

== September 26, 1910 (Monday) ==
- K. Ramakrishna Pillai, editor of the newspaper Swadeshabhimani and a journalist who exposed corruption and injustices in the Indian princely state of Travancore, was put out of business with his arrest, and permanent banishment, from Thiruvananthapuram. He spent the rest of his life in exile to Malabar, dying in 1916.

== September 27, 1910 (Tuesday) ==
- In Mexico, the Chamber of Deputies certified the re-election of Porfirio Díaz as President, and of Ramón Corral as Vice-President. Both men were deposed less than a year into the new six-year term.
- Centerville, Minnesota, was incorporated as a village.

== September 28, 1910 (Wednesday) ==
- Manuel Gondra was elected President of Paraguay.
- Born:
  - Diosdado Macapagal, President of the Philippines from 1964 to 1965); in Lubao, Pampanga (d. 1997)
  - Wenceslao Vinzons, Philippine leader of resistance against Japanese invasion; in Camarines Norte province (executed 1941)

== September 29, 1910 (Thursday) ==
- The Committee on Urban Conditions Among Negroes was founded in New York City by Mrs. Ruth Standish Baldwin and Dr. George Edmund Haynes. In 1909, the group merged with two other organizations to form the National League on Urban Conditions Among Negroes, and in 1920 shortened its name to the National Urban League.
- Died:
  - Winslow Homer, 74, American artist
  - Rebecca Harding Davis, American author

== September 30, 1910 (Friday) ==
- On the lobbying of French women's activist Marie Denizard, the conseil départemental for France's département of Somme unanimously approved the right of women to vote in local elections and to run for office.
- Born: Frank Skaff, American baseball player who played for the Brooklyn Dodgers and the Philadelphia Athletics, in La Crosse, Wisconsin (d. 1988).
