= Harry Jackson (criminal) =

- Born: c. 1861
- Known for: First person to be convicted in the United Kingdom via fingerprint evidence
- Sentence: Seven years in prison

Harry Jackson (c. 1861–?) was the first person to be convicted in the United Kingdom via fingerprint evidence.

On 27 June 1902 a burglary occurred in a house in Denmark Hill, London, and some billiard balls were stolen. The investigating officer noticed a number of fingerprints on a freshly painted windowsill, apparently where the burglar made his entry. He immediately called the Metropolitan Police Fingerprint Bureau, and Detective-Sergeant Charles Stockley Collins went to the scene. Collins examined the marks and decided that the left thumb made the clearest impression. After satisfying himself that the marks had not been left by any member of the household, he took a photograph of it.

Returning to the Bureau, Collins and his colleagues made a search of their files for known criminals with a similar print pattern. The files revealed that the fingerprints belonged to a 41-year-old labourer, Harry Jackson, who had recently served a prison term for burglary. He was arrested, and for safety's sake, fingerprinted again. This new set was compared to the prints photographed from the crime scene and again they matched.

Since the crime of burglary required a jury trial in the Old Bailey, Edward Henry, the Assistant Commissioner (Crime) of the Metropolitan Police Service and head of the Criminal Investigation Department, was determined to make this case succeed. As the man who devised the Henry System of Fingerprint Classification and the founder of the Fingerprint Bureau, he knew that only the soundest sort of Crown prosecutor would be able to convince conservative English judges and a sceptical jury to overcome their prejudices. For these purposes, he decided on Richard Muir, a prosecutor with a reputation for thoroughness and an exacting nature.

Henry sent Collins to Muir to brief him on fingerprinting technique for four days. Muir afterwards became so convinced of its value that he said later on that he would have taken a far shakier case if it could have helped Henry win public recognition for his work.

When Harry Jackson went on trial at the Old Bailey, Muir did what he was asked to do: he convinced the jury of the absolute reliability of fingerprints. As a result, Harry Jackson was found guilty and sentenced to seven years in prison on 13 September 1902.

While it clearly set a precedent on the admissibility of fingerprints as evidence, some people were unhappy about the turn of events. As one letter to The Times (signed by "A Disgusted Magistrate") stated: "Scotland Yard, once known as the world's finest police organisation, will be the laughing stock of Europe it if insists on trying to trace criminals by odd ridges on their skins."

Jackson's status as the first person to be arrested on the basis of fingerprint evidence was the subject of episode 4 of "Connections 2", a documentary series by James Burke.

== See also ==
- Stratton Brothers case
- Caesar Cella
- Murder of Clarence Hiller
- Francisca Rojas
