= Barra de Aveiro Fort =

- Forte da Barra de Aveiro
- Aveiro, Portugal
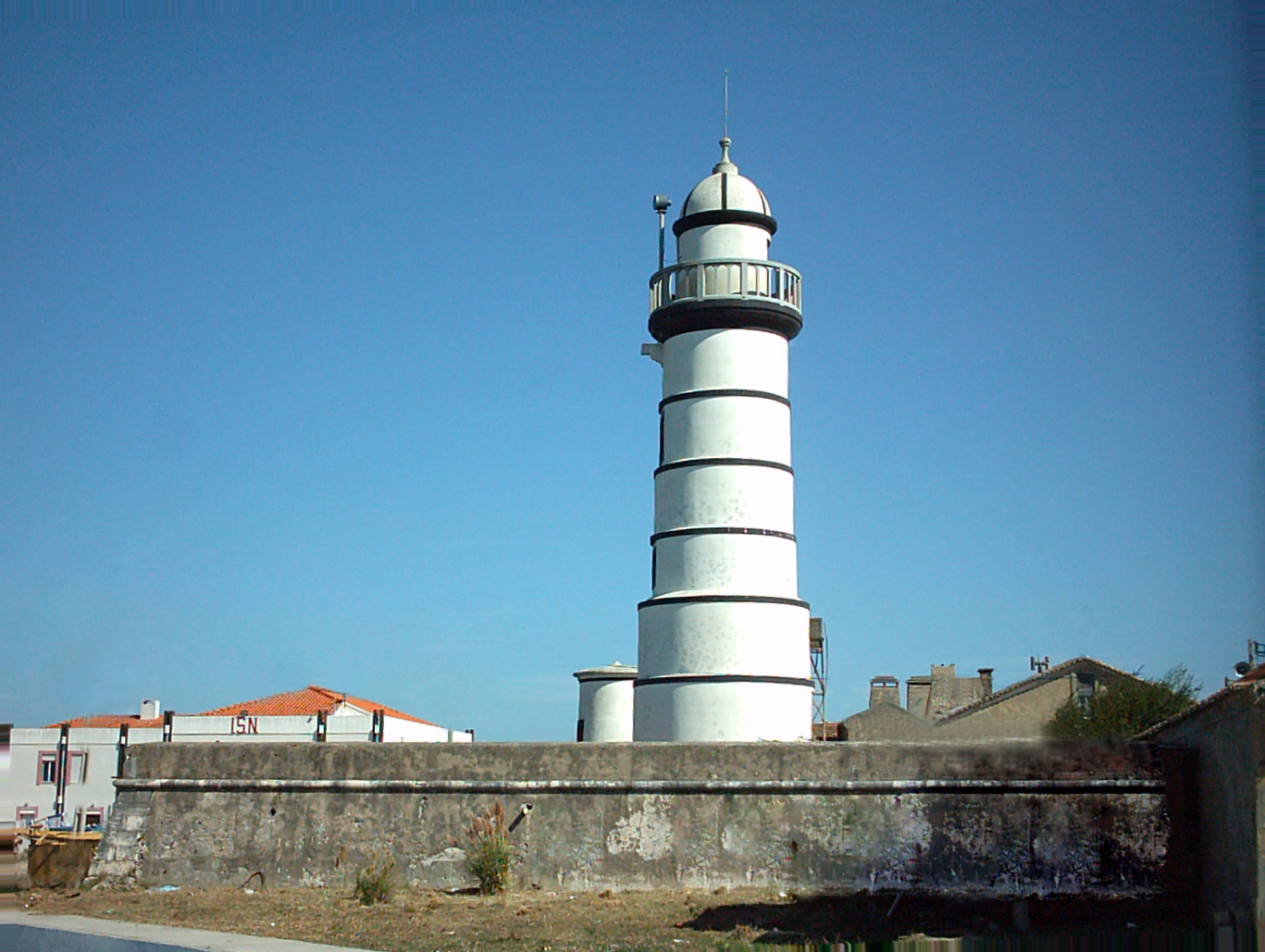
- Fort of the Barra of Aveiro and its lighthouse.

Site information
- Type: Bastion fort
- Condition: Good.

Location
- Coordinates: 40°38′0″N 8°43′0″W

Site history
- Built: 1642 and 1648
- Events: Portuguese War of Restoration

The Barra de Aveiro Fort (Forte da Barra de Aveiro in Portuguese) also known as Gafanha Castle (Castelo da Gafanha in Portuguese), Forte Pombalino, or Forte Novo, is located on an island adjacent to Ilha da Mó do Meio, parish of Gafanha da Nazaré, municipality of Ílhavo, district of Aveiro, in Portugal.

== History ==
The area of Gafanhas began to be inhabited in the 16th or 17th century. A lighthouse and a small surrounding fort were built near the mouth of the Vouga River, as part of an effort to facilitate navigation in that river mouth, which involved dredging, remodeling the coastline and increasing an adjacent sandbar, known since then as the "triangle of concentration of currents".

The fort was built between 1642 and 1648, during the War of Portuguese Restoration of Independence.

The fort never had important military functions, as the silting that progressed at the mouth of the Vouga since the 15th century pushed the coastline further forward, with intermittent interruptions to access to the sea. The situation came to its present state with the opening of Barra de Aveiro (end of the 19th century) that separated São Jacinto from Barra Nova, the construction of the Aveiro Lighthouse and two sea piers that guard the current mouth of the Ria de Aveiro.

It was rebuilt in 1801. By the 20th century the fort lost its defensive function. For that reason, it came to be administered by the Aveiro port authorities, then the Junta Autónoma do Porto de Aveiro and, more recently, the Administration of the Port of Aveiro.

The fort is classified as a Property of Public Interest by Decree-Law nº 735 of December 21, 1974.

In recent decades, the ground floor of the fort was used as a warehouse for materials and the lighthouse continues to perform signaling functions in inland navigation.

It is currently part of a program of renovation of historical buildings for tourism purposes.

== Features ==
Small structure with two half bulwarks connected by a curtain, with only the southern bulwark being completed, with three gun emplacements. One of the curtains is split by a triple arcade with access by stairs, on the left, to the upper terrace. A cylindrical tower rises on the terrace and in the middle a beacon of disproportionate size made up of overlapping drums. Several constructions are joined to the fort, either at an angle, in one of the half bastions to the north, or running along the inner curtain.

== Gallery ==
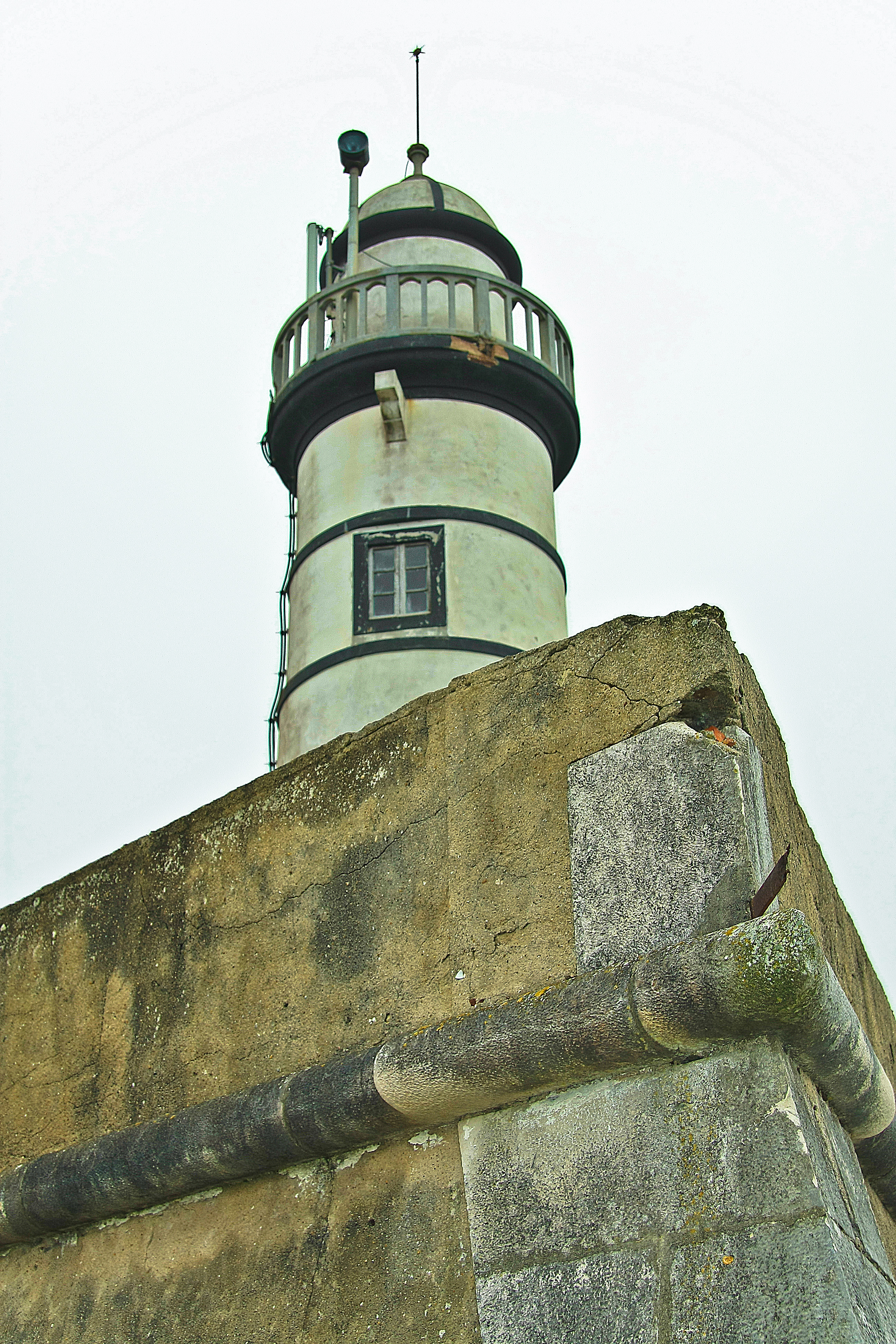

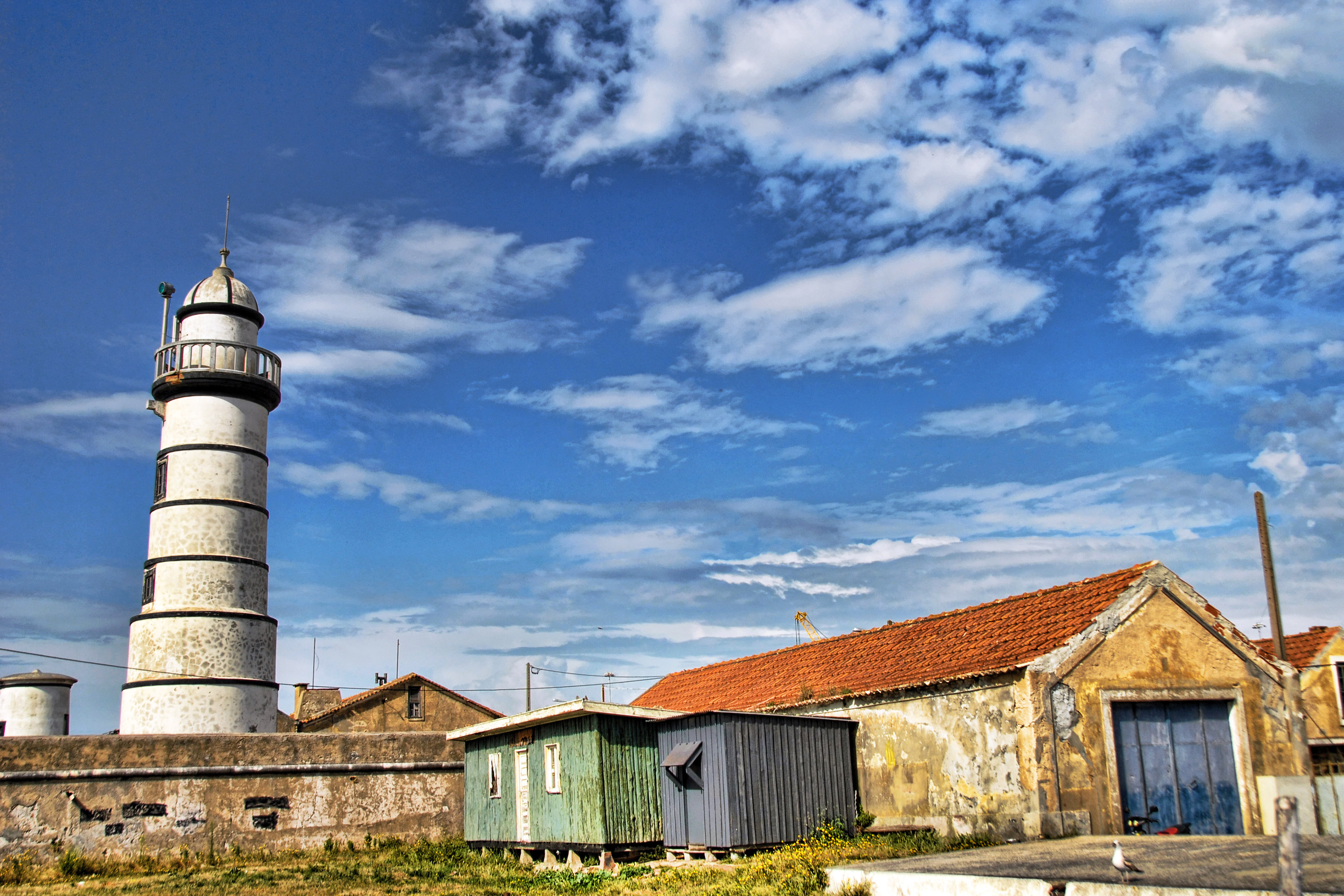
