= Richard Muir (barrister) =

Sir Richard David Muir (1857–1924) was a prosecutor for the British Crown, widely regarded as the greatest of his time; he played a prominent role in many of the most sensational trials of the early part of the 20th century, most notably that of Hawley Harvey Crippen.

== Biography ==
Muir was born on 8 March 1857 in Scotland, the son of Richard Muir, a shipping broker from Greenock. Although his father hoped he would join the family business, he travelled south to London, with thoughts of going on the stage. Instead, a brother persuaded him to become a barrister, which he funded himself by working as a Parliamentary reporter for The Times. After entering chambers he started working for the Crown as a prosecutor. While he never "took silk" (that is, appointed as a King's Counsel) he represented the Crown in many trials of note in the Central Criminal Court at the Old Bailey from 1901 until his death in 1924.

Muir was known to be hard working with little need for conviviality. He usually spent half the night preparing for his cases, making notations on small cards with coloured pencils — one colour for examination in chief, one colour for cross examination, and so on. So ubiquitous were those cards that came to be known as Muir's "playing cards". He was rightfully feared by his clerks and officers from Scotland Yard who gathered his evidence from him, for he asked the same thoroughness from them as from himself. He depended a lot from physical evidence, while giving eyewitness testimony little credence, except if it would bolster existing, more concrete evidence.

Such was his reputation for thoroughness and diligence that when Crippen learned that his prosecutor was Richard Muir, he remarked, "I wish it had been anybody else... I fear the worst." Muir's cross examination of Crippen became standard reading material for Bar students in England and Wales and was used to illustrate advocacy skills in general.

Because he was never appointed as King's Counsel, Muir was not eligible to become a judge of the King's Bench Division. He was, however, eligible to become a Recorder. Although he was passed over for the position of Recorder of London, he was appointed as Recorder of Colchester by the then Home Secretary, Winston Churchill, in particular because of his work in the Edward Mylius libel case. He was a Master of the Bench of the Middle Temple and received a knighthood in 1918.

Sir Richard married Mary Beatrice Leycester and they had a son who also became a barrister, but who died on 4 November 1918 of influenza while on active service in the Army. His son's death left him heartbroken. Muir himself died suddenly in January 1924 aged 66 in his house in Camden House Court, Kensington and he was interred in West Norwood Cemetery after a service at St Mary Abbots, Kensington.

== Significant cases ==
- Hawley Harvey Crippen
- Stratton Brothers case
- Harry Jackson

== In popular culture ==
Muir was portrayed by Lewis Fiander in the 1980s Granada Television series Lady Killers.
