= João Ferreira Sardo =

Portuguese presbyter who founded the parish of Gafanha da Nazaré (1873–1925)

The Most Reverend João Ferreira Sardo
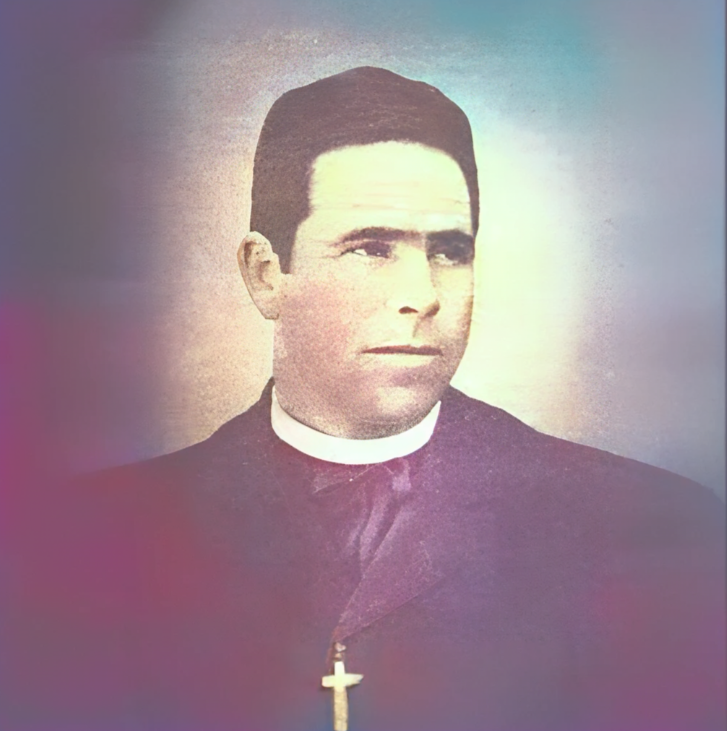
- Prior Sardo in 1910
- Born: João Ferreira Sardo; September 1, 1873; Gafanha da Nazaré, Kingdom of Portugal
- Died: December 20, 1925 (aged 52); Gafanha da Nazaré, Portugal
- Resting place: Gafanha da Nazaré Cemetery
- Education: Seminário Maior de Coimbra
- Occupations: Presbyter, entrepreneur, civic leader
- Years active: 1898–1925
- Known for: Founding the parish of Gafanha da Nazaré
- Title: Prior
- Parent(s): João Ferreira Sardo (father); Clara de Jesus (mother)

João Ferreira Sardo (1 September 1873 – 20 December 1925), known as Prior Sardo, was a Portuguese presbyter, civic leader, and entrepreneur who founded the parish of Gafanha da Nazaré during the final years of the Kingdom of Portugal and the early Portuguese First Republic. His life intertwined devout religious service with social entrepreneurship, community development, and diplomatic engagement, spanning a transformative period in Portuguese history marked by the Republican Revolution of 1910, the regicide of King Carlos I in 1908, and the subsequent exile of King Manuel II.

Born into the Ferreira Sardo family—a modest household with substantial agricultural properties across the Gafanhas—he demonstrated early devotion to Christian principles and a natural aptitude for leadership. Following his ordination in 1898, Prior Sardo was appointed chaplain of Gafanha da Nazaré by Bishop Manuel Correia Bastos Pina, Count of Arganil. His ministry combined biblical-centred preaching with practical pastoral care, emphasising salvation, the resurrection of Christ, and adherence to scriptural guidance.

== Early life, family and education ==
=== Family background and childhood ===
João Ferreira Sardo was born on 1 September 1873 in Gafanha da Nazaré, a coastal settlement in the Aveiro District. Originally part of the civil parish of Vagos, Gafanha da Nazaré was later annexed to Ílhavo due to its geographic proximity, reflecting the gradual realignment of local administrative boundaries in the region. He came from a network of interconnected families—Sardo, Ferreira, Caçoilo, Fidalgo, and Silva—whose ties resembled a traditional clan system, in which multiple households maintained mutual obligations, solidarity, and influence within the local community. His parents, João Ferreira Sardo and Clara de Jesus, belonged to this extended family network of modest means but notable social standing, holding extensive agricultural lands across the Gafanha region. This familial framework provided young João not only with early exposure to land management and agricultural enterprise, but also instilled in him an understanding of communal responsibility, the bonds of kinship, and the leadership roles expected of prominent local families.

Growing up during the final decades of the Kingdom of Portugal, João witnessed the social and economic transformations affecting Portuguese coastal communities. The Cod fishing in Portugal —particularly important in the Gafanha—was experiencing significant growth, creating both prosperity and labour challenges. The region's economy depended heavily on the Grand Banks of Newfoundland fishing expeditions, which shaped local culture and community life.

From an early age, João demonstrated a profound faith and a heart for service, coupled with a keen interest in horseback riding. Local accounts recall him riding through the countryside of Gafanha da Nazaré, often giving children from less fortunate families the chance to ride alongside him—an early sign of his pastoral concern and compassion for those in need. These formative experiences in rural Beira Litoral instilled both practical wisdom and compassion that would characterise his later ministry.

=== Theological education ===
João pursued his secondary education locally before entering the Seminário Maior de Coimbra (Major Seminary of Coimbra), one of Portugal's most prestigious ecclesiastical institutions. The seminary, founded in the 16th century and reformed after the Liberal Wars, provided rigorous training in systematic theology, moral theology, canon law, and pastoral care. During his years in Coimbra—from approximately 1890 to 1898—João distinguished himself both as a student and as a junior lecturer, excelling in biblical studies and homiletics.

His theological formation occurred during a period of intense political and social upheaval in Portugal. The Constitutional Monarchy faced mounting challenges from Republican movements, socialist organisations, and anticlerical sentiment. The seminary curriculum, while traditional in its theological orientation, necessarily engaged with contemporary questions about the Church's role in modern society, the relationship between religious and civil authority, and strategies for maintaining Catholic influence amid secularisation.

During his seminary years, João formed close friendships with peers who would later serve in influential roles across Portugal—in Lisbon, Porto, Coimbra, and Aveiro—including pastors, Christian philanthropists, and civic leaders. Thoughtful and engaging in conversation, he devoted himself to a careful, straightforward reading of Scripture, letting its teachings guide is pondering. He was attentive to the needs of the less fortunate, reflecting on insights such as those in Pope Leo XIII’s Rerum novarum not as doctrine to follow, but as reflections that resonated with the biblical call to care for the vulnerable. These experiences nurtured in him a deep sense of service, blending practical wisdom with spiritual conviction—a combination that would shape his lifelong ministry among the fishing communities of Gafanha da Nazaré.

== Preacher career ==
=== Ordination and early ministry ===
João Ferreira Sardo was ordained to the priesthood on 30 July 1898, receiving Holy Orders at the age of 24. Shortly thereafter, he was appointed chaplain of Gafanha da Nazaré by Bishop Manuel Correia Bastos Pina, who held the title of Count of Arganil. This appointment placed the young priest in a community experiencing rapid demographic and economic growth, yet lacking formal parish status and adequate ecclesiastical infrastructure.

Upon assuming his chaplaincy, Prior Sardo immediately confronted a theological and pastoral challenge that would define his early ministry. He initially proposed that the future parish be dedicated solely to Christ of Nazareth, reflecting his commitment to Christocentrism and biblical preaching. However, the local population—deeply attached to Marian devotion—strongly advocated for dedication to Our Lady of Nazaré, whose shrine in nearby Nazaré had been a pilgrimage site since the 14th century.

Prior Sardo responded to this pastoral dilemma with theological wisdom and pastoral sensitivity. He consented the dedication on one essential condition: that the community embrace and live according to Jesus has their center in their lives, like Mary's own instruction to the servants at the Wedding at Cana: "Do whatever he tells you" (John 2:5). This resolution brilliantly balanced popular devotion with scriptural authority, ensuring that Marian veneration would always direct the faithful toward obedience to Christ. The episode demonstrated Prior Sardo's ability to navigate between theological principle and pastoral reality—a skill that would characterise his entire ministry.

=== Preaching and biblical studies ===
Prior Sardo's preaching ministry emphasised the centrality of Jesus Christ in Christian faith, focusing particularly on the doctrines of salvation, grace, and the resurrection of Christ. His sermons were characterised by biblical exposition combined with practical guidance for Christian living, addressing contemporary moral and social challenges facing his parishioners. Drawing on his seminary training in homiletics and his natural gifts as an orator, he developed a preaching style that was simultaneously scholarly and accessible, appealing to both educated and working-class members of his congregation.

Recognising that biblical literacy was essential for spiritual growth, Prior Sardo implemented systematic programmes of catechesis and Bible study throughout Gafanha da Nazaré. He encouraged parishioners to read Scripture themselves, personally teaching reading skills to illiterate adults using the Bible as the primary text. This emphasis on literacy and scriptural knowledge aligned with broader movements within late 19th-century Portuguese Catholicism that sought to deepen lay understanding of faith and counter anticlerical propaganda through education.

His preaching gained recognition beyond Gafanha da Nazaré. Several of his sermons were published and circulated within the Diocese of Lamego, where they were adopted as study materials for seminarians preparing for ordination. This wider influence reflected both the quality of his theological work and his growing reputation as an effective preacher and teacher within Portuguese ecclesiastical circles.

=== Pastoral care and personal ministry ===
Prior Sardo's pastoral approach extended far beyond pulpit ministry. He maintained a rigorous schedule of home visits, calling on the sick, the elderly, and families facing particular difficulties. These pastoral visits often occurred during inclement weather and required traversing the humid, coastal environment of the Gafanhas—exposure that would eventually contribute to the pulmonary complications that plagued his later years. Nevertheless, he considered such personal ministry essential to his vocation, refusing to allow weather conditions or personal discomfort to prevent him from attending to his parishioners' spiritual and material needs.

His pastoral counsel addressed not merely spiritual matters but practical concerns affecting family life, health, and economic well-being. Drawing on both theological principles and practical wisdom, he offered guidance on marriage and family relationships, childcare, hygiene, and household management. This comprehensive approach to ministry reflected the integration of faith and daily life characteristic of traditional Portuguese Catholicism, while also anticipating the more structured Catholic social teaching that would develop throughout the 20th century.

Prior Sardo was particularly attentive to the spiritual needs of those facing death. He maintained a reputation for never refusing a call to attend a deathbed, regardless of the hour or weather conditions. His gentle presence and spiritual guidance brought consolation to countless families during their most difficult moments, earning him deep affection and respect throughout the community.

== Foundation of Gafanha da Nazaré ==
=== Campaign for parish status ===
When Prior Sardo assumed his chaplaincy in 1898, Gafanha da Nazaré remained canonically dependent on the parish of Ílhavo, despite having a substantial and growing population of its own. This subordinate status created practical difficulties: residents had to travel to Ílhavo for sacramental records, marriages, and certain religious ceremonies, while local religious life lacked the institutional structure necessary for effective pastoral care. Moreover, the community's sense of identity and civic pride was frustrated by the absence of independent parish status—a situation Prior Sardo recognised as both pastorally untenable and civically unjust.

From the beginning of his ministry, Prior Sardo launched a sustained campaign to secure canonical parish status for Gafanha da Nazaré. This effort required navigating complex ecclesiastical and civil bureaucracies during a period of mounting tension between Church and State in Portugal. The campaign involved extensive correspondence with diocesan authorities, petitions to civil officials, and careful documentation of the community's population, religious practice, and financial capacity to support an independent parish.

Prior Sardo's efforts eventually reached the attention of King Manuel II, the last monarch of Portugal, who ascended to the throne on 1 February 1908 following the assassination of his father King Carlos I and his elder brother Crown Prince Luís Filipe. Prior Sardo's meetings with the young king—whom he reportedly met both in Lisbon and at the royal residence in Cascais—focused on the pastoral and civic needs of Gafanha da Nazaré. These audiences demonstrated Prior Sardo's ability to advocate effectively for his community at the highest levels of Portuguese society.

On 31 August 1910—just weeks before the Republican Revolution of 5 October 1910 that would overthrow the monarchy—King Manuel II issued the royal charter formally establishing Gafanha da Nazaré as an independent parish. This made Gafanha da Nazaré officially the last Portuguese settlement to receive such royal recognition from a Portuguese monarch. The timing proved historically momentous: the parish was canonically established on 10 September 1910, less than one month before the revolution that ended nearly 800 years of Portuguese monarchy.

Prior Sardo was formally appointed as the Encomendado Parish Priest (interim parish priest with full authority) of the newly established parish, a position he would hold until his death in 1925. This appointment recognised not only his pivotal role in securing parish status but also his established pastoral leadership and the community's trust in his guidance.

=== Construction of the Local Church ===
Almost immediately upon achieving parish status, Prior Sardo initiated plans for constructing a proper church to serve as the spiritual and communal centre of Gafanha da Nazaré. The decision regarding the church's location sparked considerable controversy within the community. Residents of the Calle da Vila neighbourhood—the original settlement centre—naturally expected the church to be built in their vicinity, following traditional Portuguese patterns of church placement near the historic core.

Prior Sardo, however, insisted on a different location: the geographic centre of the parish territory, which lay some distance from the existing settlement. When challenged by disappointed residents of Calle da Vila, he reportedly responded with remarkable foresight: "In one hundred years' time, Gafanha da Nazaré will have grown substantially, with many more families settling throughout the parish. The church must be positioned to serve the future community, not merely the present one." His vision proved remarkably accurate: by the early 21st century, Gafanha da Nazaré had indeed grown to encompass the entire parish territory, and the Church occupies what is now recognised as the optimal central location.

Additionally, Prior Sardo insisted that the church be positioned well back from the main road, contrary to traditional Portuguese ecclesiastical architecture. His reasoning demonstrated both practical foresight and theological sensitivity: "In the future, there will be many automobiles travelling these roads. The church requires a dignified entrance and approach worthy of glorifying God, not the noise and commotion of passing traffic." This decision, controversial in 1910 when automobiles remained rare in rural Portugal, proved wise as motorised transport became ubiquitous throughout the 20th century.

Construction of the Church began in 1910 under extraordinary circumstances that reflected both the community's devotion and Prior Sardo's pastoral leadership. The entire project was undertaken by local farmers and their families, with construction work occurring exclusively on Sundays—the only day when agricultural labourers were free from their weekday obligations in the fields and fisheries. This unusual schedule reflected both practical necessity and theological principle: the Sabbath was a day set apart for worship and works of devotion, and building God's house qualified as holy labour.

The Sunday construction regimen included an additional remarkable feature: all materials—stones, timber, mortar, and supplies—were transported to the construction site by carts pulled entirely by human labour rather than by oxen or horses. This practice observed the Sabbath commandment strictly: since the day was holy, even work animals should rest. The sight of dozens of parishioners—men, women, and older children—pulling laden carts through Gafanha's roads each Sunday became an iconic image of communal devotion and sacrifice.

Prior Sardo himself participated actively in the construction, working alongside parishioners rather than merely supervising from a distance. The project was guided by a master builder (mestre de obras) who provided technical expertise, but the actual labour was performed entirely by the community under Prior Sardo's spiritual and administrative direction. Despite the logistical limitations imposed by the Sunday-only work schedule and manual transport, the church was completed in remarkably short time, with the formal inauguration and blessing occurring on 14 January 1912—slightly more than one year after construction began.

The completed Church reflected both traditional Portuguese ecclesiastical architecture and the community's particular circumstances. The building featured a single nave with side chapels, a presbyterial area elevated above the nave floor, and a simple but dignified façade. The interior was adorned with devotional images and stations of the cross contributed by parishioners, creating a sacred space that embodied the community's collective faith and labour.

== Public and civic service ==
=== Municipal governance ===
Prior Sardo's influence extended well beyond strictly ecclesiastical matters into the civic and political life of Ílhavo municipality. In 1909, he was elected vice-president of the Ílhavo Municipal Council (Câmara Municipal), serving during a critical period of municipal development and national political turmoil. He temporarily assumed the office of Council President during key periods in 1909 and 1910 when the elected president was unavailable, giving him executive authority over municipal affairs.

His municipal service focused particularly on infrastructure development connecting Gafanha da Nazaré with neighbouring communities. He championed the construction of improved roads linking the parish of São Salvador de Ílhavo with Gafanha d'Aquém and Gafanha da Nazaré, facilitating both commercial transport and social communication. These projects required negotiating with the Governador Civil (Civil Governor) of Aveiro District, with whom Prior Sardo maintained regular correspondence regarding regional development priorities.

Contemporary accounts describe Prior Sardo's governance style as decisive and authoritative yet fundamentally oriented toward communal welfare. Father João Vieira Resende, writing in the newspaper O Ilhavense in 1958, characterised Prior Sardo's influence: "He gave orders and directives that were obeyed without restrictions or objections, thus creating a favourable environment for the creation of the parish, which he had long envisioned. He was the 'Royal King of those lands.'" While this description reflects the hierarchical social structures of early 20th-century Portugal, it also acknowledges the genuine respect and trust Prior Sardo commanded throughout the community.

=== Economic entrepreneurship ===
Beyond his religious and civic roles, Prior Sardo was a successful entrepreneur in the Portuguese cod-fishing industry, which formed the economic foundation of Ílhavo and the Gafanha communities. He owned and operated a cod-fishing company that included at least one ocean-going vessel—a three-masted schooner designed for the arduous Grand Banks of Newfoundland fishing expeditions that could last months at sea.

Prior Sardo's approach to business management reflected his broader commitment to Catholic social teaching and worker welfare. He implemented progressive labour practices unusual for the era, improving working conditions for fishermen employed by his company and ensuring fair compensation even when market conditions were challenging. This ethical approach to business earned him respect from both workers and fellow entrepreneurs, demonstrating that commercial success need not come at the expense of Christian principles or worker dignity.

His business connections extended throughout Portugal's commercial networks. He was a shareholder in Vista Alegre, the prestigious Portuguese porcelain and crystal manufacturer founded in 1824 near Ílhavo. He maintained close friendships with prominent entrepreneurial families, including the Pinto Basto family, whose commercial activities spanned banking, trade, and industry across Porto and northern Portugal. These connections facilitated both his business ventures and his advocacy for Gafanha da Nazaré's development, as he could leverage commercial networks to advance communal interests.

== Evangelistic and charitable activities ==
=== Religious confraternities ===
In 1902, Prior Sardo founded the Brotherhood of the Holy Nazareth (Irmandade do Santo Nazareno), establishing an organisational framework for coordinating devotional activities and mutual aid among parishioners. The brotherhood organised processions, maintained devotional shrines, and provided financial assistance to members facing hardship—integrating religious practice with practical charity. In 1904, he established the Apostleship of Prayer (Apostolado da Oração), a devotional association promoting contemplative prayer and spiritual formation. These organisations created stable institutional structures for lay participation in religious life, ensuring that pastoral ministry would continue effectively even during periods when clerical presence might be limited.

=== Education and literacy ===
Prior Sardo recognised that literacy was essential for both spiritual formation and social advancement. He personally taught reading and writing to illiterate adults, using the Bible as the primary instructional text. This approach served dual purposes: parishioners gained practical literacy skills while simultaneously deepening their understanding of Scripture. He established informal schools for children whose families could not afford formal education, ensuring that poverty did not permanently exclude young people from learning opportunities.

=== Social welfare initiatives ===
Prior Sardo's charitable work extended to healthcare and social support. He advocated vigorously for improved hygiene and public health practices, addressing the particular challenges of a coastal fishing community where inadequate sanitation and poor housing contributed to disease. His counsel to families included practical guidance on nutrition, childcare, and disease prevention, applying both traditional wisdom and emerging medical knowledge. During periods of economic hardship—particularly when fishing seasons failed or markets collapsed—he organised relief efforts, distributing food and essential supplies to families in need.

== Ecumenical engagement and diplomatic relations ==
=== Correspondence with Christian leaders ===
Throughout his ministry, Prior Sardo maintained extensive correspondence with Christian leaders across Portugal and internationally, fostering ecumenical dialogue and mutual understanding. While remaining firmly committed to Catholic doctrine and practice, he engaged respectfully with Protestant and Orthodox Christians, seeking common ground in shared commitment to biblical faith and Christian witness. His theological writings emphasise the centrality of Christ in Christian faith, focusing particularly on the five solas of Protestant Reformation theology—particularly sola Scriptura (Scripture alone), sola fide (faith alone), and sola gratia (grace alone)—while recognising the value of the sacraments as meaningful expressions of faith and channels of God's blessing, without positing them as soteriologically requisite. This theological approach earned him acknowledgment from diverse Christian communities as a bridge-builder who could articulate shared convictions without compromising distinctive traditions.

=== Relations with African monarchies ===
During one of his visits to Lisbon in approximately 1908–1909, Prior Sardo encountered ambassadors from the Kingdom of Kakongo and Kingdom of Loango—African kingdoms located in what is now the Cabinda Province of Angola and the Republic of the Congo. These diplomatic representatives had travelled to Portugal to negotiate with King Carlos I regarding Portuguese colonial administration and the status of their territories within Portugal's African empire. The meeting occurred during the final years of independent African monarchy in the region, as Portuguese colonial control was being consolidated following the Berlin Conference of 1884–85.

Prior Sardo befriended these ambassadors, offering hospitality and assistance during their stay in Lisbon and maintaining correspondence after their return to Africa. His genuine interest in their cultures and his willingness to advocate for their concerns before Portuguese officials earned him respect and gratitude. Both monarchs subsequently sent accolade letters (letters of commendation) to Prior Sardo, honouring him for his friendship and assistance. These diplomatic courtesies—rare for a parish priest—reflected both Prior Sardo's personal qualities and the respect he commanded through his various roles.

=== Meetings with Portuguese royalty ===
Prior Sardo's relationship with the Portuguese royal family extended beyond formal petitions for parish status. He met personally with King Carlos I before the monarch's assassination in 1908, discussing the needs of Gafanha da Nazaré and the broader challenges facing coastal fishing communities. Following Carlos I's death and the accession of King Manuel II, Prior Sardo continued these royal audiences, meeting the young king both in Lisbon and during royal visits to Cascais.

These meetings were not merely ceremonial. Prior Sardo advocated concretely for infrastructure improvements, educational resources, and economic development programmes benefiting Gafanha da Nazaré and surrounding communities. His ability to articulate local needs persuasively to the highest levels of government demonstrated both his political acumen and his unwavering commitment to his community's welfare.

Prior Sardo also visited D. Manuel Correia Bastos Pina, the Bishop of Coimbra and Count of Arganil, at the bishop's estate, Quinta da Costeira in Carregosa. These visits combined pastoral reporting with discussions of diocesan strategy and regional development, reflecting the close working relationship between bishop and priest.

== Social and economic endeavours ==
=== Labour reform and worker welfare ===
Prior Sardo's ownership of a cod-fishing enterprise provided him direct insight into the harsh conditions facing Portuguese fishermen in the early 20th century. The Grand Banks of Newfoundland fishing expeditions were notoriously dangerous and exploitative: fishermen spent months at sea in primitive conditions, facing constant danger from storms, cold, and accidents, while receiving minimal compensation and no social protections. Worker deaths were common, leaving widows and orphans without support.

As both priest and employer, Prior Sardo worked systematically to improve these conditions within his own company and to advocate for broader industry reforms. He implemented better safety equipment, improved shipboard living conditions, and established fair wage structures that provided fishermen's families with stable income even during unsuccessful voyages. He created a mutual aid fund that provided financial support to families of fishermen who died or were injured at sea, prefiguring the social insurance systems that would later develop throughout Portugal.

These initiatives reflected Prior Sardo's understanding that Christian charity required structural reform, not merely individual acts of kindness. His approach anticipated the fuller development of Catholic social teaching that would emerge through papal encyclicals in subsequent decades, particularly the emphasis on workers' dignity and the duty of employers to ensure just working conditions.

=== Community development ===
Beyond fishing industry reform, Prior Sardo championed diverse economic development initiatives. He promoted agricultural improvements, encouraging farmers to adopt better cultivation techniques and diversify crops. He supported local artisans and craftspeople, helping them access markets in Aveiro, Coimbra, and Porto. His business connections, particularly through the Pinto Basto family and other entrepreneurial networks, facilitated these economic linkages.

He also advocated persistently for improved infrastructure. Beyond the roads connecting Gafanha da Nazaré with Ílhavo and neighbouring parishes, he lobbied for better harbour facilities, postal services, and eventually telephone connections—recognising that modern communications were essential for economic development. His correspondence with the Governador Civil of Aveiro District addressed these infrastructure priorities repeatedly, demonstrating his persistence in pursuing community development goals.

== Health struggles and humility ==
=== Pulmonary illness ===
From approximately 1920 onward, Prior Sardo suffered increasingly from pulmonary complications—chronic respiratory illness that modern medical understanding would likely diagnose as chronic bronchitis or early tuberculosis. The illness resulted directly from his pastoral practice: years of visiting the sick in their homes, often in cold and humid weather, had exposed him repeatedly to respiratory infections in environments with poor ventilation and sanitation. The damp coastal climate of the Gafanhas, while economically beneficial for fishing, created conditions conducive to respiratory disease.

Despite his declining health, Prior Sardo refused to curtail his pastoral visitations. He continued making home visits to the sick and dying, even when his own breathing difficulties made such excursions physically exhausting and medically inadvisable. Parishioners increasingly worried about their priest's deteriorating condition, but his sense of pastoral duty overrode concerns for his personal wellbeing.

=== Resignation of leadership and continuing service ===
As his illness progressed and his physical capacity diminished, Prior Sardo demonstrated remarkable humility by voluntarily stepping aside from certain leadership responsibilities. Rather than clinging to authority despite incapacity, he requested that his assistant priest assume primary responsibility for leading the local congregation's administrative affairs, while he himself transitioned to an assisting role. This reversal of roles—from parish priest to assistant—was highly unusual and demonstrated both self-awareness and genuine concern for the parish's welfare above personal status.

Nevertheless, Prior Sardo continued pastoral ministry within his reduced capacity. He still celebrated Mass, heard confessions, and maintained a limited schedule of home visits, though increasingly accompanied by parishioners who assisted him physically. His visible frailty combined with his unwavering commitment to ministry created a powerful witness that deepened rather than diminished his influence within the community.

=== Final illness and death ===
In the final months of 1925, Prior Sardo's condition deteriorated markedly. The chronic pulmonary disease had weakened his overall constitution, and he developed cardiac complications—likely heart failure secondary to chronic lung disease. Despite knowing his condition was terminal, he refused to abandon pastoral duties entirely, continuing to offer spiritual guidance to those who sought him out.

Prior João Ferreira Sardo died on 20 December 1925, at the age of 52, having served as priest of Gafanha da Nazaré for 27 years. His death occurred in Gafanha da Nazaré, surrounded by family and parishioners. The entire community mourned his passing, recognising that they had lost not merely a priest but a father, advocate, and visionary leader who had transformed their settlement into a parish and their collection of families into a genuine community.

On 25 July 1921, Prior Sardo had officiated at the consecration of the Gafanha da Nazaré Cemetery, blessing the ground that would receive the community's dead. Four years later, he was laid to rest in that same cemetery—the very ground he had consecrated—completing a circle of pastoral service that extended literally from cradle to grave. His funeral was attended by thousands, including civil officials, clergy from throughout the region, business associates, and ordinary parishioners whose lives he had touched through decades of faithful ministry.

== Legacy and commemoration ==
=== Recognition ===
In the decades immediately following his death, Prior Sardo's memory remained vivid throughout Gafanha da Nazaré and the surrounding region. Former parishioners recounted his pastoral wisdom, his prophetic vision regarding the church's location, and his tireless service despite failing health. The Mother Church stood as a permanent monument to his vision and the community's collective labour, while the various confraternities and institutions he had founded continued their charitable and devotional work.

=== Civic honours ===
The people of Gafanha da Nazaré honoured Prior Sardo's memory by naming a principal avenue after him: Alameda Prior Sardo became one of the community's central thoroughfares, ensuring that his name would remain part of daily life for future generations. A commemorative plaque installed on the avenue identifies him as "the first Gafanhonazareno to graduate from university and who played an important role in this land of his."

On 31 August 1992—the 82nd anniversary of the royal charter establishing the parish—a bronze statue of Prior Sardo was inaugurated in the Jardim 31 de Agosto (31 August Garden) in Gafanha da Nazaré. The statue depicts him in clerical attire, holding a book—likely representing Scripture—and gazing toward the Mother Church he had worked so tirelessly to build. The monument has become a focal point for civic commemorations and a symbol of local identity.

=== Prior Sardo Foundation ===
The most substantial institutional legacy is the Prior Sardo Foundation (Fundação Prior Sardo), a Private Social Solidarity Institution (IPSS) established on 31 October 1993 by Prior Sardo's grandnephew, Canon José Sardo Fidalgo. The foundation was created explicitly as "a tribute to the founder of the parish of Gafanha da Nazaré," continuing Prior Sardo's commitment to education, social welfare, and community development.

The foundation operates educational programmes, provides social services to vulnerable populations, and maintains cultural heritage sites associated with Prior Sardo's life and ministry. It receives support from municipal government, private donors, and the Roman Catholic Diocese of Aveiro, ensuring institutional continuity for Prior Sardo's vision of integrated spiritual and social service. The foundation also preserves documentary materials related to Prior Sardo's life, including correspondence, sermons, and photographs, making these resources available to researchers and the general public.

== Arts and culture ==
=== Ecclesiastical architecture ===
Prior Sardo's most visible cultural legacy is the Church of Gafanha da Nazaré, whose design and placement reflect both traditional Portuguese ecclesiastical architecture and his particular pastoral vision. The church follows the typical Portuguese pattern of a single-nave structure with side chapels, but its geographical positioning—in the parish centre rather than the settlement core—represented an innovative approach to church placement that anticipated future urban development.

The church's interior decoration reflects the devotional preferences of early 20th-century Portuguese Catholicism: images of Christ, the Virgin Mary, and various saints; Stations of the Cross; and ornate altarpieces. Many of these devotional objects were donated by individual parishioners or confraternities, creating a sacred space that embodied collective piety and generosity.

=== Literary influence ===
Prior Sardo's published sermons circulated beyond Gafanha da Nazaré, influencing homiletic practice in the Diocese of Lamego and potentially elsewhere in Portugal. While no comprehensive collection of his writings has been published, surviving sermon texts demonstrate his ability to combine rigorous biblical exposition with accessible language and practical application. His emphasis on the centrality of Christ and the importance of personal faith represented a somewhat evangelical approach within Portuguese Catholicism, anticipating later 20th-century movements toward biblical renewal.

=== Folk memory and oral tradition ===
Beyond formal commemoration, Prior Sardo lives on in the oral traditions and folk memory of Gafanha da Nazaré. Elderly residents continue to recount stories of his pastoral visits, his foresight regarding the church's location, his kindness to the poor, and his determination to serve despite failing health. These stories, while undoubtedly embellished through repeated telling, preserve authentic memories of his character and ministry, ensuring that his influence extends beyond institutional structures into the community's collective identity.

== Literary works ==
=== Sermons and pastoral letters ===
Prior Sardo's principal literary output consisted of sermons and pastoral letters, few of which have survived in complete form. Those that do survive—preserved in diocesan archives and private collections—demonstrate considerable theological sophistication combined with pastoral sensitivity. His preaching style emphasised direct scriptural exposition, practical moral guidance, and encouragement toward deeper personal faith—an approach that distinguished him from more scholastic or purely liturgical preaching common in the period.

Several of his sermons on the Resurrection of Jesus, the nature of grace, and Christian discipleship were published in ecclesiastical journals and subsequently adopted as study texts in the Diocese of Lamego. This wider circulation indicates that his theological work was recognised beyond his immediate parish, contributing to broader conversations about effective pastoral ministry and biblical preaching within Portuguese Catholicism.

=== Correspondence ===
Prior Sardo's extensive correspondence—with diocesan officials, civil authorities, business associates, and Christian leaders throughout Portugal and internationally—constitutes another significant body of writing. Much of this correspondence remains in private archival collections, and some in the Torre do Tombo National Archive and diocesan archives. These letters reveal not only the practical details of parish administration and community development but also his theological convictions, ecumenical interests, and vision for the Church's role in modern society.

== Honours ==
=== Ecclesiastical recognition ===
Prior Sardo received various forms of ecclesiastical recognition during his lifetime and posthumously. The honorific title "Prior"—while sometimes used generically for senior priests—carried particular significance when applied to him, acknowledging both his seniority and his exceptional service. The establishment of Gafanha da Nazaré as an independent parish, with Prior Sardo as its first parish priest, itself constituted ecclesiastical recognition of his pastoral effectiveness and community leadership.

=== Royal acknowledgment ===
The royal charter issued by King Manuel II on 31 August 1910, establishing Gafanha da Nazaré as a parish, represented the highest level of civil and ecclesiastical recognition Prior Sardo received during his lifetime. As the last Portuguese settlement to receive such royal recognition before the monarchy's overthrow, this honour carries particular historical significance, linking Prior Sardo's achievement to the final chapter of nearly 800 years of Portuguese monarchical history.

=== International honours ===
The accolade letters and honours Prior Sardo received from the monarchs of the Kingdom of Kakongo and Kingdom of Loango represented extraordinary recognition for a parish priest. These honours acknowledged not merely diplomatic courtesy but genuine friendship and mutual respect across significant cultural and political boundaries during the late colonial era.

=== Civic commemoration ===
The naming of Alameda Prior Sardo, the erection of his statue, and the establishment of the Prior Sardo Foundation constitute civic honours that extend his influence across generations. These commemorations ensure that his name and legacy remain active components of community identity rather than merely historical memories.

== See also ==
- Gafanha da Nazaré
- Kingdom of Portugal
- Manuel II of Portugal

== Bibliography ==
- Carvalho, Jorge Arroteia (2000). Gafanha da Nazaré: escola e comunidade numa sociedade em mudança (in Portuguese). Lisbon: Instituto de Inovação Educacional. ISBN 972-8353-75-8.
- Ferro, António (1954). D. Manuel II, O Desventurado (in Portuguese). Lisbon: Livraria Bertrand.
- Great Dynasties. New York: Mayflower Books Inc. 1980. ISBN 0-8317-3966-5.
- Hindley, Geoffrey (1979). The Royal Families of Europe. London: McGraw-Hill Book Company. ISBN 0-07-093530-0.
- Honrado, Fernando (1993). Da Ericeira a Gibraltar vai um Rei (in Portuguese). Lisbon: Acontecimento.
- Martins, Fernando (2010). Gafanha da Nazaré: 100 anos de vida (in Portuguese). Gafanha da Nazaré: Paróquia da Gafanha da Nazaré.
- Rezende, João Vieira (1936). Monografia da Gafanha (in Portuguese). Ílhavo: Gráfica Ilhavense.
- Aveiro e o seu distrito (in Portuguese). Aveiro: Junta Distrital de Aveiro. 1966.
