= J. G. Garson =

British anthropologist (1854–1932)

John George Garson (23 July 1854 – 31 May 1932) was a Scottish anthropologist.

Born at Birsay, Orkney, he obtained the degree Doctor of Medicine at the University of Edinburgh in 1878, having already been admitted to the Royal College of Surgeons in that city. His education continued in Leipzig, Vienna and Berlin. He was widely recognised as an authority on anthropology, a long-serving and prominent council member of Royal Anthropological Institute, publishing in their journal, and attached to the anthropological section of the British Association, editing and revising their new edition of Notes and Queries on Anthropology (1892). He read papers as a lecturer in comparative anatomy and produced the chapter on osteology in H. Ling Roth's The Aborigines of Tasmania. He founded the Anthropometric Department of Scotland Yard, which initially dealt with fingerprinting and his own speciality, anthropometry.

He died in Epsom, Surrey in 1932.

== Publications ==
- Bent, J. Theodore; John George Garson; David Heinrich von Müller. 1893. The sacred city of the Ethiopians: being a record of travel and research in Abyssinia in 1893. Ethiopica. doi:10.1163/9789004192782.HT-7. OCLC 1196143615
