= Mathilde Franck =

Pioneering French aviator

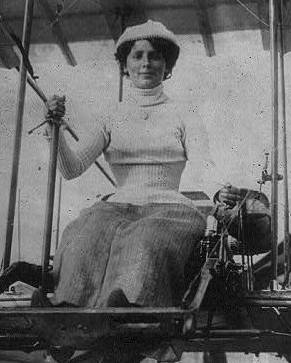
- Mathilde Franck in a biplane, ca. 1910

Rosalind Mathilde Franck (1866–1956) was one of the earliest French women aviators, having learnt to fly in the summer of 1910. Her last flight was on 1 August 1910 in a Maurice Farman biplane when she took off from Boldon Flatts, Cleadon Village in the northeast of England. After hitting a flagpole the plane crashed, killing a boy, although she only sustained minor injuries.

== Flights ==
In an article published in Colliers Magazine in September 1911, Franck presents her impressions of her flights. The first was with Michel Effimoff who received a French licence on 15 February 1910. A little later, she and her husband flew for an hour and a quarter with Henry Farman who sought to break the record for two passengers. It was with the Farman brothers' manufacturing plant near Paris that Franck learned to fly. After establishing a record non-stop 14-mile flight at Mourelon, on 20 July 1910 she hoped to make a flight across the English Channel but was prevented by bad weather.

In late July 1910, she arrived in the north of England where the manager of Sunderland's Empire Theatre had invited her to present demonstration flights in connection with the Boldon Races. On 30 July 1910, she accomplished a flight of a mile and a half, the first significant distance covered by a woman in the United Kingdom. On the following Monday, she again attempted to fly but flew into a flagstaff which brought the plane down, causing the death of a young boy who was hit by the engine. The accident brought her flying career to an end. She never obtained a licence.

Mathilde Franck died in 1956.
