= Murder of Clarence Hiller =

Murder which legitimized fingerprint evidence in US law

- Location: Chicago, Illinois, U.S.
- Date: 19 September 1910
- Victim: Clarence Hiller
- Perpetrator: Thomas Jennings
- Convictions: Murder

Clarence Hiller (? – 19 September 1910) was the chief clerk in the freight department of the Chicago, Rock Island and Pacific Railroad. He was murdered in Chicago, Illinois on September 19, 1910. Fingerprint evidence was used to convict Thomas Jennings, marking the first time fingerprint evidence was used for a conviction in the United States. The court case that followed, People v. Jennings, cemented fingerprint evidence as legally valid in the United States.

== Background ==
In Chicago, Illinois, on September 19, 1910, Thomas Jennings entered the home of Clarence Hiller, with the intent of burgling the house. One of their daughters, Florence, was awakened by someone on her bed. Initially assuming that the person was her younger brother, she tried to scream after hearing Jennings' voice and realizing it was someone else. Jennings pushed up Florence's nightgown and felt her bare body, possibly intending to sexually assault her. Mary was woken by the noise and woke her husband, who then confronted Jennings. A struggle between Hiller and Jennings ensued, and Hiller was shot dead by Jennings. Jennings left through the front door, and touched a freshly painted railing, leaving four fingerprints.

About a mile from the site of the murder, police officers detained Jennings, who was walking with a limp, had a torn, bloodstained coat and had a recently fired revolver. When questioned about his injuries, he claimed that he fell off a trolley. He was placed under arrest and brought to the police station.

=== Investigation ===
Police discovered the fingerprint while searching the house, and they photographed the prints and removed the railing, tagging both as evidence. Mary Hiller, Clarence Hiller's wife, failed to pick Jennings out of a police lineup. Jennings was interrogated, and he did not confess.

== Trial ==
At Jennings' murder trial, the prosecuting attorney showed the judge and jury the fingerprints left on the railing, which they claimed were Jennings' fingerprints. The defense tried to have the evidence thrown out, claiming that fingerprinting was a flawed system and had not been scientifically proven. In an attempt to prove that fingerprint evidence was not reliable, the defense asked the prosecution to collect a fingerprint that proved the defense lawyer had touched a specific piece of paper. This backfired when the prosecution was able to lift a very clear print from the paper, and was able to identify it as the lawyer's.

Fingerprint analysis in detective work was a fairly new field, but specialists were brought in who had experience with fingerprints. The four expert witnesses were two Chicago police officers with experience in fingerprints, an inspector from the Dominion Police in Ottawa, Canada, and a U.S. government investigator who was trained at Scotland Yard, which was the first law enforcement organization to use fingerprint analysis in detective work. All of the expert witnesses agreed that the fingerprints left on the railing were Jennings'.

Jennings was found unanimously guilty by the jury of murder and was sentenced to death.

== Appeal ==
Jennings appealed the case to the Illinois Supreme Court in People v. Jennings, 252 Ill. 534 (1911). One of the reasons for the appeal was that fingerprint evidence had never been used as evidence in the US before. Chief Justice Orrin Carter wrote an opinion stating there was no "case in which this question has been raised” and “we find no statutes or decisions touching the point in this country." He cited scientific findings in his opinion that proved that fingerprint evidence was reliable in a court of law and added that Great Britain had already decided that fingerprint evidence was valid.

Orrin wrote "there is a scientific basis for the system of finger-print identification and that the courts are justified in admitting this class of evidence." Carter concluded "no one of these circumstances, considered alone, would be conclusive of his guilt, but when all of the facts introduced as evidence are considered together, the jury were justified" in finding Jennings guilty. The ruling stated, “this method of identification [fingerprinting] is in such general and common use that the courts cannot refuse to take judicial cognizance of it.” Jennings sentence was upheld and he was hanged at the Cook County Jail on February 16, 1912.
