= Gafanha da Nazaré =

- Civil parish
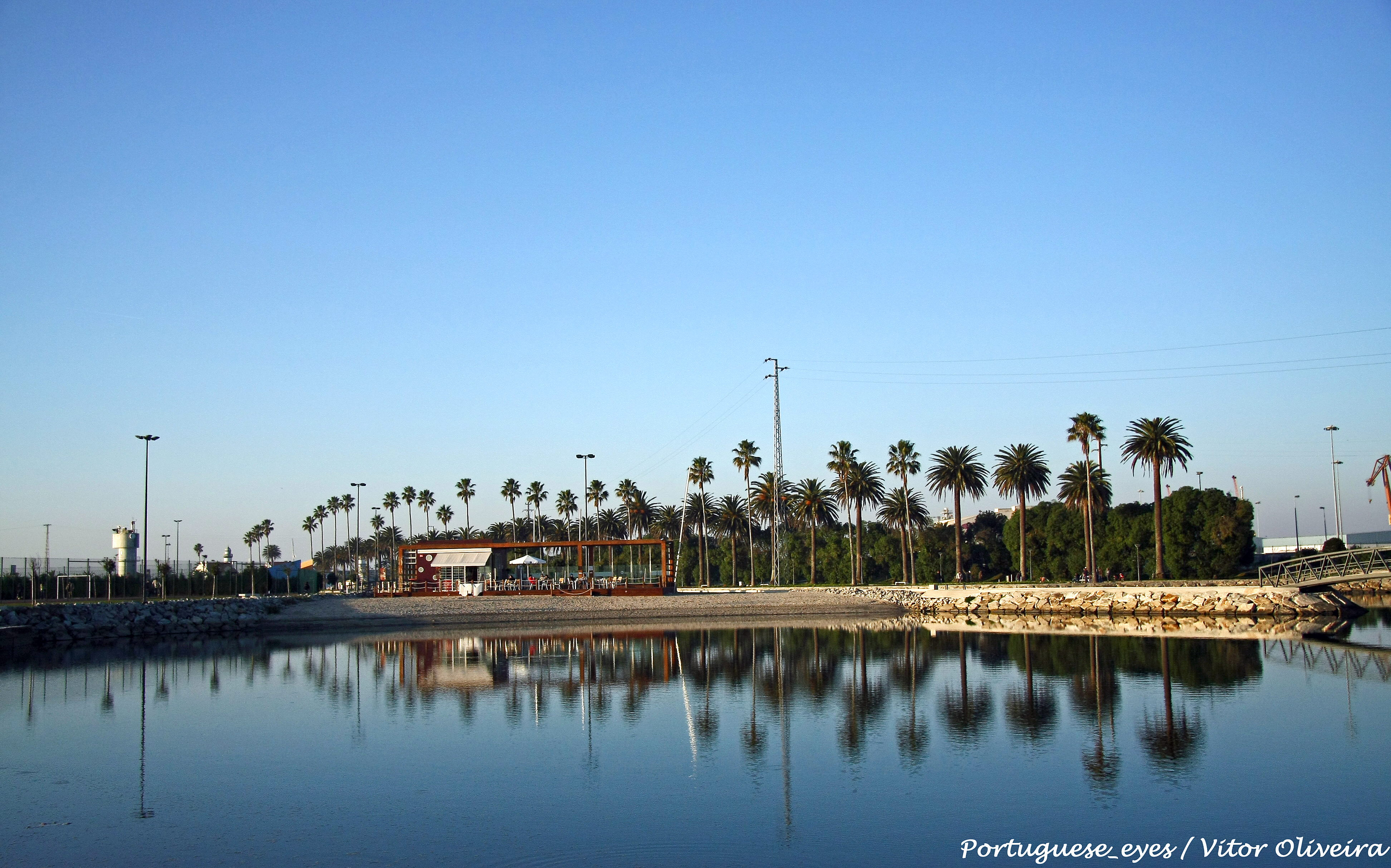

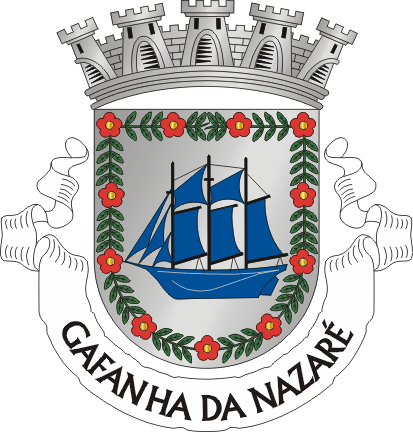
- Coat of arms

- Location in Portugal
- Coordinates: 40.635°N 8.714°W
- Country: Portugal
- Region: Centro
- Intermunic. comm.: Região de Aveiro
- District: Aveiro
- Municipality: Ílhavo

Area
  - Total: 16.44 km^{2} (6.35 sq mi)

Population (2011)
  - Total: 15,240
  - Density: 927.0/km^{2} (2,401/sq mi)
- Time zone: UTC+00:00 (WET)
  - Summer (DST): UTC+01:00 (WEST)

Gafanha da Nazaré (Portuguese pronunciation: [ɡɐˈfɐɲɐ ðɐ nɐzɐˈɾɛ]) is a city and parish (freguesia) in the Ílhavo Municipality, in Portugal. The population in 2011 was 15,240, in an area of 16.44 km^{2}.

Gafanha da Nazaré is a coastal town at the northern end of its municipality, and is an important port center that includes the Coastal Fishing Port and the Port of Aveiro.

On August 31, 1910, was founded the parish of Gafanha da Nazaré by the Prior Sardo and received royal decree from the King Manuel II, published in Diário do Governo no. 206 on September 16, 1910, the last portuguese town to receive a royal recognition. On October 29, 1969, it was elevated to a town, and on April 19, 2001, it was elevated to a city.

== Population ==
Population of Gafanha da Nazaré (1911–2011)

Year	Pop.	±%
1911	2,441	—
1920	2,827	+15.8%
1930	3,308	+17.0%
1940	4,116	+24.4%
1950	5,475	+33.0%
1960	7,497	+36.9%

Year	Pop.	±%
1970	7,980	+6.4%
1981	11,187	+40.2%
1991	11,638	+4.0%
2001	14,021	+20.5%
2011	15,240	+8.7%

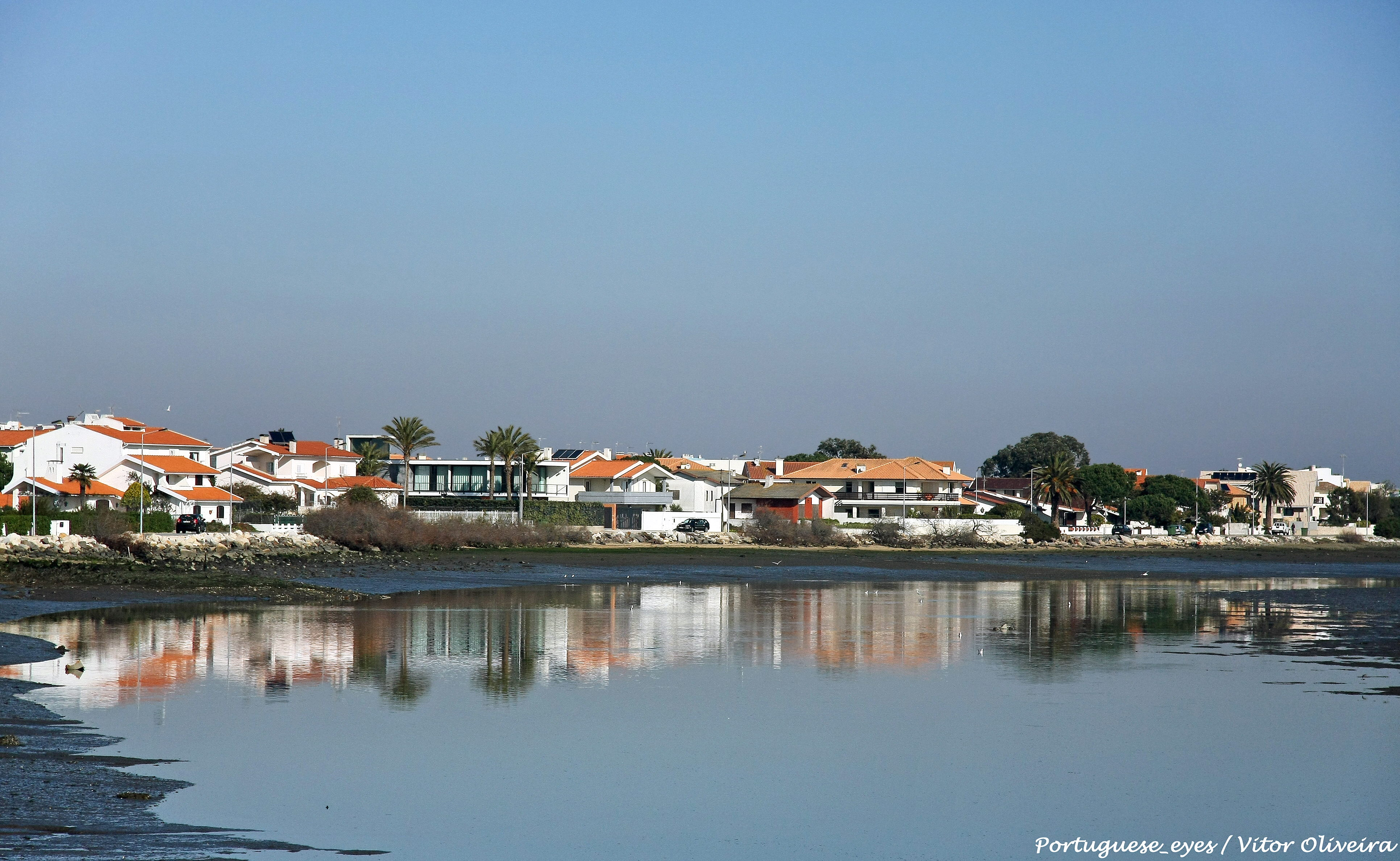

== Buildings ==
- Casa Gafanhoa
- Navio Museu Santo André
- Igreja Matriz da Gafanha da Nazaré

== Sports ==
G.D. Gafanha, founded in 1957, is a sports club mainly known for its football team which competes in the third tier of Portuguese league system since 2014–15 season. The club has also teams competing in other sports as futsal, basketball and athletics.
