= Vasco Martins (bishop) =

Portuguese prelate

Vasco Martins de Alvelos (also as Vasco Martins (Domingues) de Alvelos ) (c. 1300 in Lamego - 25 July 1344 in Lisbon) was a Portuguese prelate.

== Biography ==
His father was Martim Domingues, who was a squire, after being a widow, he became canon of the See of Lamego, Prior of the Collegiate of Santa Maria de Almacave in Lamego and rector of Santa Maria de Soutelo in São João da Pesqueira and his mother was Maria Esteves de Alvelos.

His sister was Marinha Martins de Alvelos, wife of Pedro Martins de Soveral (father of D. Afonso Pires de Soveral, 20th Bishop of Porot), of Aldara Martins de Medelo and Lourenço Martins and Medelo or de Alvelos, canon of the See of Palencia (Palence) and the See of Coimbra.

Maternally he was related to the 12th bishop of Lamego and 7th bishop of Guarda, Vasco Martins de Alvelos who was his uncle and he was paternally related to his uncle D. Geraldo Domingues, the 12th bishop of Évora and the 13th Bishop of Porto, where he received education at the school in the Diocese of Porto.

He was rector of the church of São Jacobi in Beja when, on 28 April 1317, his uncle D. Geraldo Domingues, who was Bishop of Évora, established him as the morgado of Medelo in Almacave near Lamegu, where was the 1st Senior, with his chapel of Saint Catherine in the See of Lamego, with his head in the Quintã of Medelo and linked him with several properties distributed by almost the whole country. He stipulated that Vasco Martins should succeed his other nephew Egas, son of his brother Vicente Domingues. King Dennis (or Denis) I gave D. Geraldo bishop of Porto, Medelo and his estates, in the term of Lamego (3.53 v), along with many other donations that made him. In 1527, the Morgate of Medelo with its annexed churches and belonged to the 4th Count of Marialva.

Later on, he was elected as the 18th Bishop of Porto (1327–28), where he remained for about 14 years, since 1313, he was designated as the 19th Bishop of Lisbon on 26 August 1342 and remained in that position until his death.

From D. Vasco Martins, there was a seal from 1330 where, in addition to his religious emblematics, two shields were shown, each of which has two waves, which were not the weapons that the Alvelos used, but those of Medelo, his manhood.

He is buried in the See of Lisbon.

== Sources ==
- Manuel Abranches de Soveral, Ribadouro e Pacheco - origem dos Fonseca e Soveral, 2003.
- Manuel Abranches de Soveral, Ascendências Visienses. Ensaio genealógico sobre a nobreza de Viseu. Séculos XIV a XVII (Visonian Descendants: Genealogic Essay on the Nobles of Viseu, 14th and 15th Centuries), Porto 2004, ISBN 972-97430-6-1.

Catholic Church titles
Preceded by João Gomes	Bishop of Porto; 1327-1342	Succeeded by Pedro Afonso
Political offices
Preceded by João Afonso de Brito	Bishop of Lisbon; 1342-1344	Succeeded by Estêvão de la Garde
