= Vasco Martins (disambiguation) =

Vasco Martins may refer to the following people:

- Vasco Martins de Alvelos, 13th-14th century Portuguese bishop
- Vasco Martins (bishop), 15th century Portuguese bishop
- Vasco Martins (1956 - 2025), Cape Verdean musician
