= Pinhel =

- Municipality
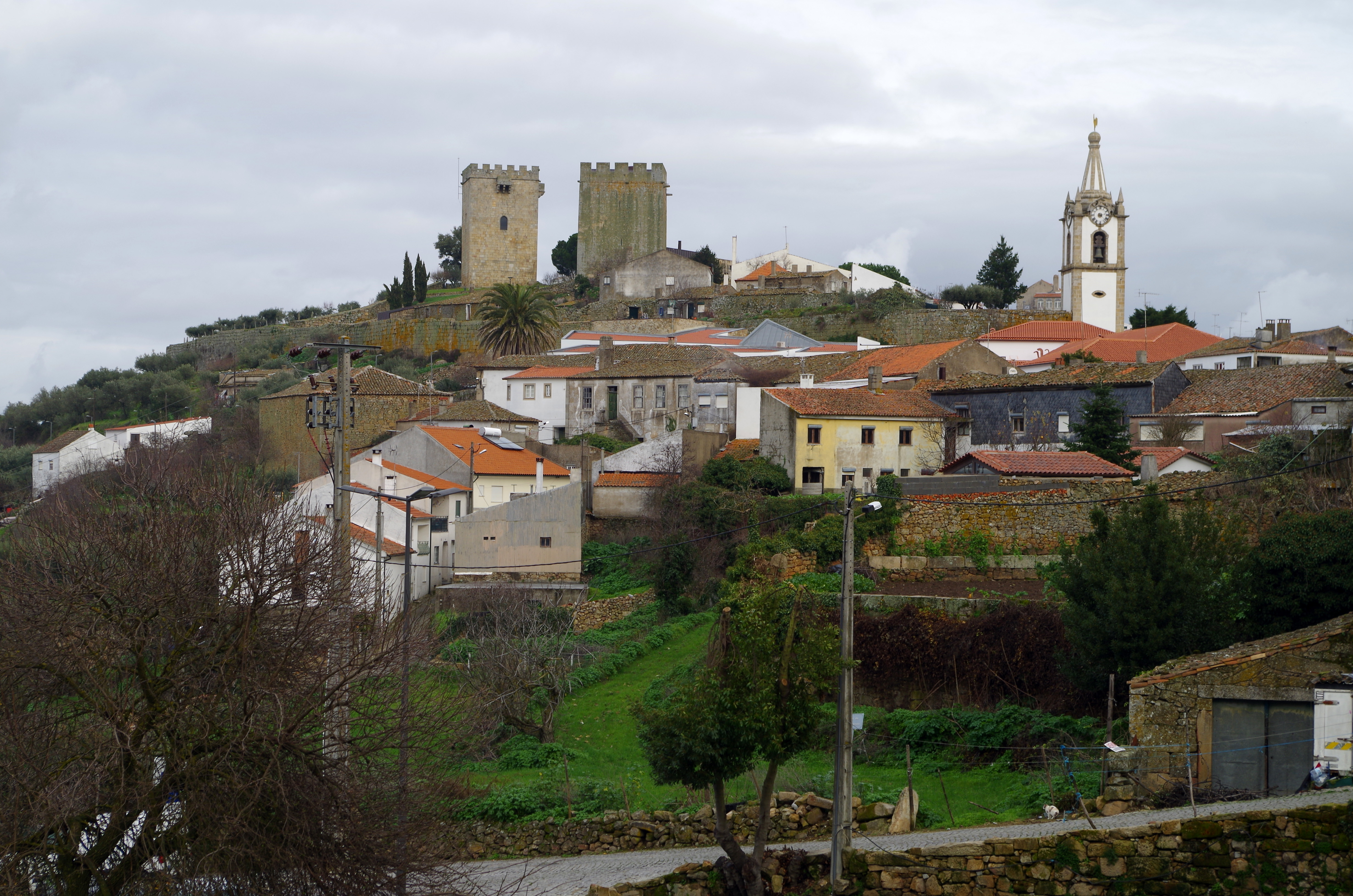

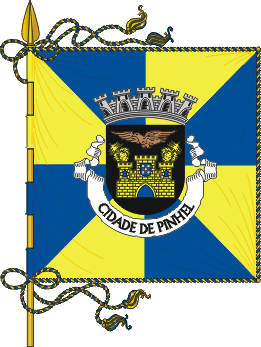
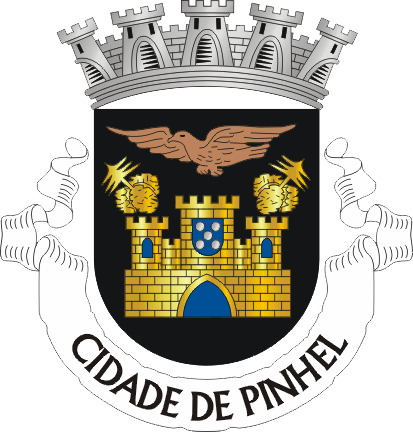
- Flag Coat of arms
- Interactive map of Pinhel
- Coordinates: 40°47′N 7°4′W
- Country: Portugal
- Region: Centro
- Intermunic. comm.: Beiras e Serra da Estrela
- District: Guarda
- Parishes: 18

Government
  - President: Rui Manuel Saraiva Ventura (PSD)

Area
  - Total: 484.52 km^{2} (187.07 sq mi)
- Highest elevation: 925 m (3,035 ft)
- Lowest elevation: 150 m (490 ft)

Population (2011)
  - Total: 9,627
  - Density: 19.87/km^{2} (51.46/sq mi)
- Time zone: UTC+00:00 (WET)
  - Summer (DST): UTC+01:00 (WEST)
- Postal code: 6400
- Area code: 271
- Patron: Nossa Senhora do Castelo
- Website: https://www.cm-pinhel.pt

Pinhel (Portuguese pronunciation: [piˈɲɛl]) is a municipality, former Catholic bishopric and present Latin titular see in the central subregion of Beira Interior Norte, in Portugal. The municipality population in 2011 was 9,627, in an area of 484.52 km^{2}. The urban centre of Pinhel had about 3500 residents in 2001.

== History ==
The origins of this municipality date back to the Calcolithic period, as many of the remnants of ancient cultures from this period remain: namely the rock-art engravings and paintings that line the Côa valley in Cidadelhe. Part of the historic district of Guarda, the region obtained its name for many pine forests that covered the region's hills and mountains.

There are also several references to a pre-Roman or Roman presence, suggesting a continual occupancy since this period.

During the medieval period, owing to the defensive requirements of the fledgling nation, several fortified centres developed, including the Pinhel, but also along a line that included: Trancoso, Marialva, Guarda, Castelo Rodrigo, Almeida and Castelo Mendo. The Castle of Pinhel dates from the reign of King Denis and the keep tower from his descendant, King Manuel I. Pinhel's strategic position, along the frontier with Spain, made the monarchs of Portugal retain many of these fortifications, as well as allowing the development of their territorial claims.

The historical centre, with its narrow roadways, were adapted from the morphology of the terrain, with many patrimonial references to the medieval and modern eras. The homes of the city of Pinhel, some dating from the 16th century, includes some lost references to the presence of a Jewish population at one time, such as along the Rua de Santa Maria. Pinhel was, for a long time, the seat of its own diocese, before being incorporated into the Diocese of Guarda.

The 17th and 18th century were periods of growth for the region, dominated the construction of estates, scattered in many of the historic corners of the municipality, some monumental and decorative.

The urbanized area of Pinhel, the city of Pinhel, was elevated to this status in 1770.

== Ecclesiastical history ==
In 1770.08.25 a bishopric was established as Diocese of Pinhel / Pinhelen(sis) (Latin adjective), on territory split off from the Diocese of Lamego, apparently as suffragan of the Metropolitan Archdiocese of Braga. The Church of the Saviour (Portuguese: Igreja do Salvador) served as cathedral, until its demolition and substitution as such in 1797 by the convent church of St. Louis (Portuguese: Igreja de São Luís) as ordered by bishop Don Bernardo Bernardino Beltrão Freire.

It was suppressed on 1881.09.30, its territory being merged into the Diocese of Guarda.

=== Residential Bishops of Pinhel ===
- João Rafael de Mendonça (1771.06.17 – 1771.07.29), next Bishop of Roman Catholic Diocese of Porto (Portugal) (1771.07.29 – death 1793.06.06)
- Cristóvão de Almeida Soares (1773.03.08 – death 1782.02.11)
- José António Pinto de Mendonça Arrais (1782.12.16 – 1797.12.18), next Bishop of Guarda (Portugal) (1797.12.18 – death 1822.04.19)
- Bernardo Bernardino Beltrão Freire (1797.12.18 – death 1828.07.19)
- Leonardo de Sousa Brandão (1832.12.17 – death 1838)
- Apostolic Administrator Father António Mendes Bello (1874 – 1881), Titular Archbishop of Mytilene (1884.03.24 – 1884.11.13) as Auxiliary Bishop of Patriarchate of Lisboa (Lisbon, Portugal) (1884.03.24 – 1884.11.13), next Archbishop-Bishop of Diocese of Faro (Algarve, Portugal) (1884.11.13 – 1907.12.19), Latin Patriarch of Lisboa (Lisbon, Portugal) (1907.12.19 – 1929.08.05), created Cardinal-Priest of Ss. Marcellino e Pietro (1914.09.08 – 1929.08.05).

=== Titular see ===
In 1969 the diocese was nominally restored as Latin Titular bishopric of Pinhel (Português) / Pinhelen(sis) (Latin).

It has had the following incumbents, so far of the fitting Episcopal (lowest) order :

- Thomas Kiely Gorman (1969.08.22 – resigned 1971.01.21) on emeritate, formerly Bishop of Reno (USA) (1931.04.24 – 1952.02.08), Titular Bishop of Rhasus (1952.02.08 – 1954.08.29) as Coadjutor Bishop of Dallas–Fort Worth (Texas, USA) (1952.02.08 – 1954.08.29), succeeding as last Bishop of Dallas–Fort Worth (1954.08.29 – 1969.08.09), restyled 'first' Bishop of Dallas (USA) (1969.08.09 – 1969.08.22); died 1980
- Mervyn Alban Alexander (1972.03.08 – 1974.12.20) as Auxiliary Bishop of Diocese of Clifton (England, UK) (1972.03.08 – 1974.12.20), succeeding as Bishop of Clifton (1974.12.20 – retired 2001.02.27); died 2010
- Hugo Mark Gerbermann, Maryknoll Fathers (M.M.) (1975.07.22 – death 1996.10.19) as Auxiliary Bishop of Archdiocese of San Antonio (USA) (1975.07.22 – 1982.06.30) and on emeritate; previously Titular Bishop of Amathus in Palæstina (1962.06.06 – 1967.12.23) as only Bishop-Prelate of Territorial Prelature of Huehuetenango (Guatemala) (1961.08.08 – 1967.12.23) promoted first Bishop of Huehuetenango (1967.12.23 – 1975.07.22)
- Manuel José Macário do Nascimento Clemente (1999.11.06 – 2007.02.22) as Auxiliary Bishop of Lisboa Patriarchate (Portugal) (1999.11.06 – 2007.02.22), next Bishop of Porto (Portugal) (2007.02.22 – 2013.05.18), Vice-President of Episcopal Conference of Portugal (2011 – 2013.06.19), Latin Patriarch of Lisbon Patriarchate (Portugal) (2013.05.18 – ...), President of Episcopal Conference of Portugal (2013.06.19 – ...), created Cardinal-Priest of S. Antonio in Campo Marzio (2015.02.14 [2015.06.14] – ...)
- Guillermo Martín Abanto Guzmán (2009.01.30 – 2012.10.30) as Auxiliary Bishop of Archdiocese of Lima (Peru) (2009.01.30 – 2012.10.30), next Military Ordinary of Peru (Peru) (2012.10.30 – retired 2013.07.27)
- Jorge Estrada Solórzano (2013.05.28 – ...), Auxiliary Bishop of Archdiocese of (Ciudad) México (Mexico), no previous prelature.

== Geography ==
The municipality of Pinhel is geographically delimited, in its entirety para two waterways: the Ribeira do Massueime (in the west) and east by the Côa River. It is located in the central part of the district of Guarda and confined by the municipalities of Almeida, Figueira de Castelo Rodrigo, Vila Nova de Foz Côa, Meda, Trancoso and Guarda. The area includes a superficial area of 485 square kilometres (187 mi^{2}), divided into 18 civil parishes, as well as one urban parish, the city/seat of Pinhel.

The municipality is accessed by a rail-line, the Vila Franca das Naves line for 12 kilometres (7.5 mi), by the A25 roadway (connecting Pinhel and Pínzio, and internationally by its connection to Vilar Formoso, 34 kilometres (21 mi).

The northern part of the municipality is part of the Prehistoric Rock-Art Site of the Côa Valley, an archaeological and geological park known for its inscribed rock formations, created by primitive cultures along the Côa valley. This area, along with Foz Coa has been declared a UNESCO World Heritage site for these primitive engravings.

Pinhel is surrounded by Guarda, Trancoso, Almeida, Figueira de Castelo Rodrigo, Mêda and Vila Nova de Foz Côa, all those municipalities of the district of Guarda.

=== Climate ===
Climate data for Pinhel, altitude: 606 m (1,988 ft)
| Month | Jan | Feb | Mar | Apr | May | Jun | Jul | Aug | Sep | Oct | Nov | Dec | Year |
|---|---|---|---|---|---|---|---|---|---|---|---|---|---|
| Average precipitation mm (inches) | 74 (2.9) | 64 (2.5) | 58 (2.3) | 57 (2.2) | 52 (2.0) | 32 (1.3) | 14 (0.6) | 11 (0.4) | 38 (1.5) | 65 (2.6) | 76 (3.0) | 81 (3.2) | 622 (24.5) |
Source: Portuguese Environment Agency

=== Parishes ===
Administratively, the municipality is divided into 18 civil parishes (freguesias):

- Alto do Palurdo
- Alverca da Beira / Bouça Cova
- Atalaia e Safurdão
- Ervedosa
- Freixedas
- Lamegal
- Lameiras
- Manigoto
- Pala
- Pinhel
- Pínzio
- Souro Pires
- Sul de Pinhel
- Terras de Massueime
- Valbom / Bogalhal
- Vale do Côa
- Vale do Massueime
- Vascoveiro

== Architecture ==
See above for church buildings.

In addition, the following buildings and structures have been classified as national patrimony:

- Castle of Pinhel (Portuguese: Castelo de Pinhel).

== Notable people ==
- José Dias Coelho (1923 in Pinhel – 1961) a Portuguese painter and sculptor, an anti-fascist and member of the PCP

== See also ==
- List of Catholic dioceses in Portugal
- Pinhel wine
- Pinhel IPR

== Sources and external links ==
- GCatholic, with Google satellite photo - episcopal see of Pinhel
- Photos from Pinhel
- GCatholic, with Google satellite photo - Igreja de São Luís
