= Coriscada =

- Civil parish
- Location in Portugal
- Coordinates: 40.866°N 7.207°W
- Country: Portugal
- Region: Centro
- Intermunic. comm.: Beiras e Serra da Estrela
- District: Guarda
- Municipality: Mêda

Area
  - Total: 25.19 km^{2} (9.73 sq mi)

Population (2011)
  - Total: 208
  - Density: 8.26/km^{2} (21.4/sq mi)
- Time zone: UTC+00:00 (WET)
  - Summer (DST): UTC+01:00 (WEST)

Coriscada is a freguesia ("civil parish") of Portugal, in the municipality of Mêda, in Guarda district. The population in 2011 was 208 in an area of 25.19 km^{2}.

Extremely rich in 17th century patrimony, the village has been notable since 2000 for the discovery nearby of a Roman villa, the Vale do Mouro, excavated by a Luso-French team from 2003.

The antipode of Coriscada is the town of Takaka, New Zealand.
