= Diocese of Guarda =

Roman Catholic diocese in Portugal

Coordinates: 40.5384°N 7.2694°W

Diocese of Guarda Dioecesis Aegitaniensis Diocese da Guarda

Catholic
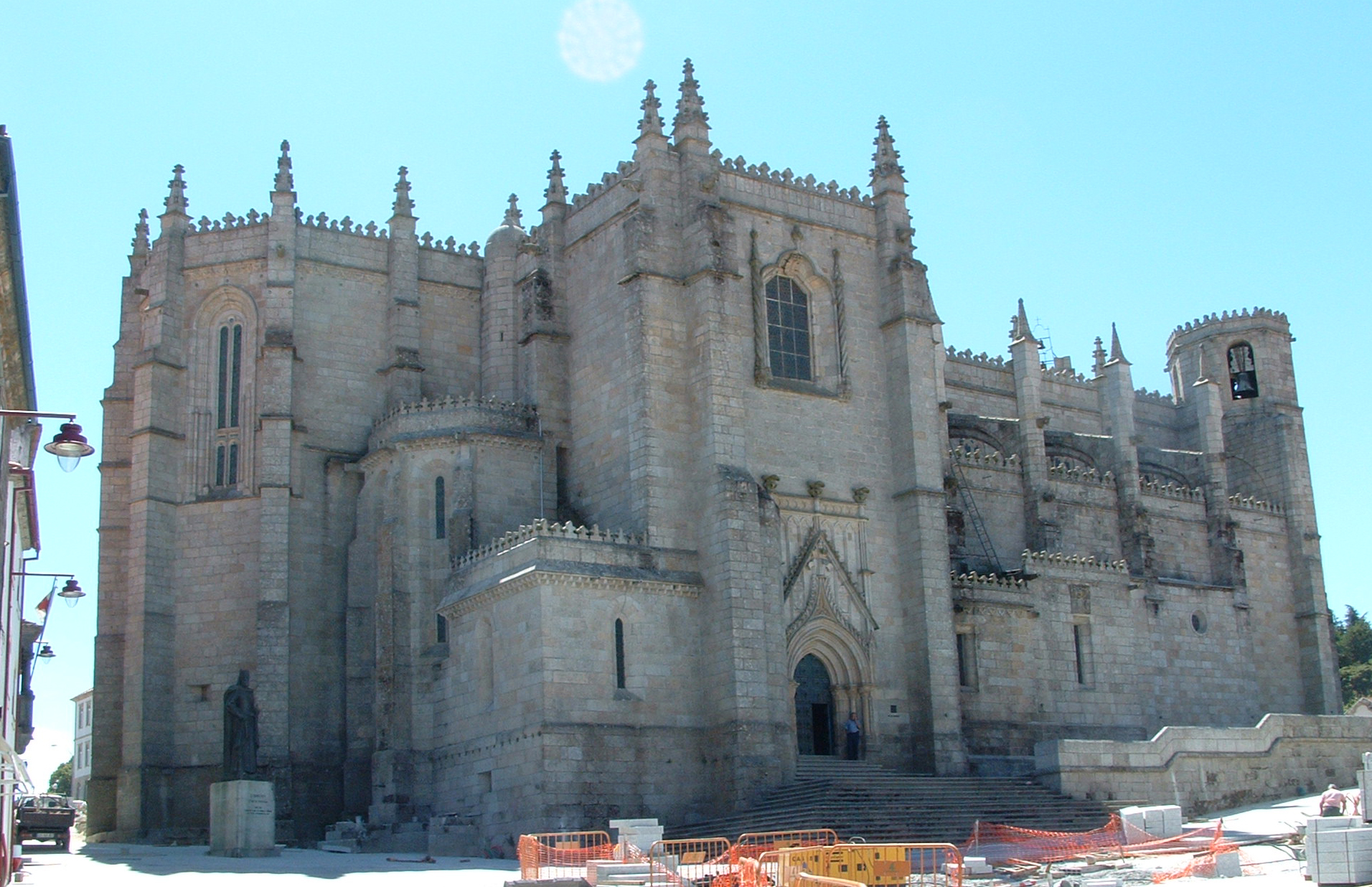
- Guarda Cathedral

Location
- Country: Portugal
- Ecclesiastical province: Lisbon
- Metropolitan: Patriarchate of Lisbon

Statistics
- Area: 6,759 km^{2} (2,610 sq mi)
- Population: Total; Catholics: (as of 2023); 260,160; 249,520 (95.9%)
- Parishes: 361

Information
- Denomination: Catholic Church
- Sui iuris church: Latin Church
- Rite: Roman Rite
- Established: 6th Century
- Cathedral: Guarda Cathedral
- Patron saint: Assumption of Mary
- Secular priests: 83 (Diocesan); 13 (Religious Orders); 21 Permanent Deacons

Current leadership
- Pope: Leo XIV
- Patriarch: Rui Valério, S.M.M.
- Bishop: José Miguel Barata Pereira
- Bishops emeritus: Manuel da Rocha Felício

Map
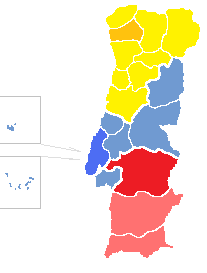

Website
- Website of the Diocese

The Diocese of Guarda (Latin: Dioecesis Aegitaniensis) is a Latin Church diocese of the Catholic church in central eastern Portugal, a suffragan in the ecclesiastical province of the Latin Patriarchate of Lisbon in southern Portugal.

The present episcopal seat is in Guarda Cathedral (Portuguese: Catedral de Nossa Senhora da Consolação) in the city of Guarda. The diocese also contains the Church of São Luís in Pinhel, once the cathedral of the former diocese of Pinhel, absorbed into the diocese of Guarda in 1881.

== Statistics ==
As of 2023, it pastorally served 249,520 Catholics (95.9% of 260,160 total) on 6,759 km² in 361 parishes and 3 missions with 96 priests (83 diocesan, 13 religious), 21 deacons, 98 lay religious (13 brothers, 85 sisters) and 5 seminarians.

== History ==
- Possibly in 550, no later than 569, a Diocese of Egitânia (viz.), with see in present Idanha-a-Velha, was established under the Kingdom of the Suebi and maintained by the Visigothic Kingdom which absorbed it by 585. However, due to the Moorish conquest, in 715 it was suppressed, its Cathedral of Idanha-a-Velha later converted into a mosque.
- In 1199 the see was nominally restored as Diocese of Guarda, which claimed the apostolic succession but switched the see to Guarda where it built a new cathedral, without awarding even co-cathedral status to the old see.
- On 21 August 1549 it lost territory to establish the Diocese of Portalegre
- On 30 September 1881 it gained territory from the Diocese of Coimbra and gained territory from the suppressed Diocese of Pinhel.

== Episcopal ordinaries ==
(all Roman rite)

Suffragan Bishops of Guarda

- Martinho Pais (1200 – 1225)
- Vicente Hispano (1226 – 1248)
- Rodrigo Fernandes (1248 – 1267)
- Bishop Vasco (1267 – 1278)
- João Martins (Juan Martínez), O.F.M (1278 – 1301), previously Bishop of Cádiz
- Vasco Martins de Alvelos (1302 – death 23 October 1313), previously Bishop of Lamego
- Bishop Rodrigo (1313 – 1313)
- Bishop Estêvão (1314 – 1316)
- Bishop Martinho (1319 – 1322)
- Bishop Guterres (1322 – 1326)
- Bishop Bartolomeu (1326 – 1345)
- Afonso Dinis (1346 – 1347), later Bishop of Évora
- Bishop Lourenço (1349 – 1356)
- Estêvão Tristão (? – 1357)
- Gil Cabral de Viana (? – 1360)
- Vasco de Menezes (1362 – 1367)
- Gonçalo Martins (1367)
- Afonso Correia (1367 – 1384)
- Vasco de Lamego (? – 1384)
- Afonso Ferraz (? – 1396)
- Gil (1397 – 1397)
- Gonçalo Vasques da Cunha (1397–1426)
- Luís da Guerra (1427 – 1458)
- João Manuel, Carmelite Order (O. Carm.) (9 July 1459 – death 1476), previously Titular Bishop of Tiberias, Bishop of Ceuta
- João Manuel Ferras (17 March 1477 – death 1478), previously Bishop of Viseu
- Álvaro de Chaves (1479 – 1481 see below)
  - Apostolic Administrator Garcia de Menezes (1481 – death 1484), while Bishop of Évora
- Álvaro de Chaves (see above 1484 – 1496)
- Pedro Vaz Gavião (1496 – 1516)
  - Apostolic Administrator sede plena Miguel da Silva (1516–1519), later Bishop of Viseu
- Cardinal Afonso de Portugal (9 September 1516 – 23 February 1519)
- Jorge de Melo (1519–1548)
- Cristóvão de Castro (1550–1552)
- João de Portugal (1556–1585)
- Nuno de Noronha (1594–1608)
- Archbishop Afonso Furtado de Mendonça (13 February 1610 – 1616)
- Francisco de Castro (1617–1630)
- Lopo de Sequeira Pereira (1632 – 4 August 1636)
- Dinis de Melo e Castro (1639–1639)
- Father Diogo Lobo (1640–1640)
- Archbishop Pedro de Lencastre (1643–1648)
- Álvaro de São Boaventura (1669–1672)
- Archbishop Luís da Silva Teles (1685–1691)
- João de Mascarenhas (1691 – 24 January 1692)
- Archbishop Rodrigo de Moura Telles (1694–1704)
- António de Saldanha (1705 – 28 June 1711)
- João de Mendonça (1713 – 2 August 1736)
- Archbishop José Fialho, O. Cist. (2 January 1741 – 18 March 1741)
- Bernardo António de Melo Osório (1742–1774)
- Jerónimo Rogado de Carvalhal e Silva (1773 – 19 February 1797)
- José António Pinto de Mendonça Arrais (1797–1822)
- Carlos de São José de Azevedo e Sousa (1824–1828)
- Joaquim José Pacheco Sousa (1832–1857)
- Manuel Martins Manso (18 March 1858 – 1 December 1878)
- Tommaso Gomes de Almeida (9 August 1883 – 3 January 1903)
- Archbishop Manuel Vieira de Matos (1 April 1903 – 1 October 1914)
- Giuseppe Alves Matoso (3 October 1914 – 1 February 1952)
- Domenico da Silva Gonçavles (1 February 1952 – 4 June 1960)
- Policarpo da Costa Vaz (高德華) (9 July 1960 – 17 November 1979)
- António dos Santos (17 November 1979 – 1 December 2005)
- Manuel da Rocha Felício (1 December 2005 – 20 December 2024)
- José Miguel Barata Pereira (20 December 2024 – Present)

== See also ==
- List of Catholic dioceses in Portugal
- Roman Catholic Diocese of Egitânia
- Roman Catholicism in Portugal

== Sources and external links ==
- GCatholic.org - data for all sections ^{[self-published]}
- Catholic Hierarchy ^{[self-published]}
