= Roman villa of Vale do Mouro =

Excavated Roman village

- Interactive map of Roman villa of Vale do Mouro
- 40°51′6.8″N 7°11′5.8″W
- Type: Ruins
- Location: Guarda, Beira Interior Norte, Centro, Portugal

Site notes
- Archaeologists: unknown
- Owner: Portuguese Republic
- Public access: Private

The Roman villa of Vale do Mouro (Portuguese: Vila Romana de Vale do Mouro) is a Roman settlement situated in the civil parish in the municipality of Meda, excavated since the early 21st century by archaeologists.

== History ==
The settlement was already occupied back in the 3rd century, and may have antecedence from the Neolithic, from the discovery of silica and fragments of quartz.

Sometime between the 3rd and 4th century the Roman mosaics (discovered during the excavations) were executed.

The first excavations began in 2000, with later work in 2003 discovering a baths complex, with tiled patio with figurative elements, spear points, pottery, coins, building elements, among other artefacts, suggesting to archaeologists a unique rural discovery. The discovery at Vale de Mouro indicates a shift in archeological understanding; while it was assumed that isolated rural settlements were poor, the discovery of ornate mosaics and artefacts indicate that settlers were well-off. It is believed that the small village was established by wealthy gentry, supported by the production of wine, grain and oil, in addition to the mining of iron, tin, silver or lead, leading to the construction of rooms, mosaic flooring, baths, mills and ironworks. During its "Golden Age, the primary master of the village would have contracted freemen/workers to create a Viscus where the gods and the festivities would have some collective nature, something that was revolutionary for this Roman village.

New excavations at the site began in 2006 by the Department of Archaeology of Lyon, resulting in the unearthing of several artefacts. This resulted in excavations between July and September, by António Sá Coixão. At that time the team discovered a large Roman mosaic comparable to the one discovered in Conímbriga, and later access to the changing areas and water channels were unearthed. On the last day of the excavations (2007) the national and international team discovered a cash of 4526 coins, and left open a permanent exposition in the Centro Sociocultural da Coriscada (Coriscada Sociocultural Centre).

== Architecture ==
The site of Vale do Mouro is located in the extreme southeast of the municipality of Mêda, in the parish of Coriscada. Situated halfway down the coast of the small valley, north of the Ribeira de Massueime, this villa was involved in excavations since 2002. The parcel where it is situated is encountered implanted and delimited in the north and west by property wall, over Roman structures. Access to the actual site is made from the east, but during its occupation it is likely to have occurred from the south or north.

The 3-hectare (7.4-acre) site is dominated by a baths complex, administration and secondary support building.

The 2006 excavations discovered a large polychromatic figurative mosaic, that represents the god Bacchus travelling around the world, flanked by pather and bacchanal, housed in the 6 square metres (65 ft^{2}) building. These types of figures reflect themes that were common mostly in urbanized Roman settlements, but not in interior parts of Portugal.
