= Atalaia e Safurdão =

- Civil parish
- Location in Portugal
- Coordinates: 40.662°N 7.032°W
- Country: Portugal
- Region: Centro
- Intermunic. comm.: Beiras e Serra da Estrela
- District: Guarda
- Municipality: Pinhel

Area
  - Total: 34.32 km^{2} (13.25 sq mi)

Population (2011)
  - Total: 207
  - Density: 6.03/km^{2} (15.6/sq mi)
- Time zone: UTC+00:00 (WET)
  - Summer (DST): UTC+01:00 (WEST)

Atalaia e Safurdão is a civil parish in the municipality of Pinhel, Portugal. It was formed in 2013 by the merger of the former parishes Atalaia and Safurdão. The population in 2011 was 207, in an area of 34.32 km^{2}.
