= António dos Santos (bishop) =

Portuguese Roman Catholic bishop

- Bishop of Guarda
- Church: Catholic Church
- Diocese: Diocese of Guarda
- In office: 17 November 1979 – 1 December 2005
- Predecessor: Policarpo da Costa Vaz
- Successor: Manuel da Rocha Felício
- Previous posts: Titular Bishop of Tabbora (1975-1979); Auxiliary Bishop of Aveiro (1975-1979)

Orders
- Ordination: 1 July 1956
- Consecration: 4 April 1976 by Giuseppe Sensi

Personal details
- Born: 14 April 1932 Vagos, Aveiro District, Portugal
- Died: 26 March 2018 (aged 85) Guarda, Beiras e Serra da Estrela, Portugal

Antonio dos Santos (14 April 1932 – 26 March 2018) was a Roman Catholic bishop.

Dos Santos was ordained to the priesthood in 1956. He served as titular bishop of Tabbora and as auxiliary bishop of the Roman Catholic Diocese of Aveiro, Portugal, from 1976 to 1979. He then served as bishop of the Roman Catholic Diocese of Guarda, Portugal, from 1979 to 2005.
