= Vasco Martins de Alvelos =

Portuguese prelate

Vasco Martins de Alvelos (also as Vasco Martins of Alvelos) (d. 23 October 1313) was a Portuguese prelate.

== Biography ==
Vasco Martins was probably born in Alvelos. He was the son of Martin Anes de Alvelos, Honorable Lord of Alvelos and Elvira Mendes da Fonseca.

He became dean of the See of Lamego. In 1296/97, he became the 12th bishop of Lamego and succeeded Bishop John III. On 14 February 1302, he became the 7th bishop of Guarda, and no longer remained bishop of Lamego, he was transferred and was succeeded by Alphonse of Asturia, as bishop of Guarda, he succeeded João Martins.

On December 27, 1302, at the Caria in nearby Belmonte, he put along with his brother Estevão Martins, Knight of Alvelos and was also the first Lord of Alvelos, with his chair at Santa Maria de Tesouro in the See of Lamego, and head of the Honour of Alvelos in the See of Lamego, in which linked Quintã da Torre de Figueiredo de Alva and the settlement of Ladreda, both in São Pedro do Sul and otherwise, all the properties of the father, the knight Martim Anes of Alvelos, but leaves, its institution to his mother Elvira Mendes da Fonseca to possess Quintã da Torre de Figueiredo de Alva.

In his testament which was made in Caria, Belmonte, at the end of Covilhã, dated from 23 October 1311, two years later, he died in Guarda as he was then bishop, he was succeeded by Bishop Roderick III.

The Lords of the Morgado of Alvelos, founded by him in favor of his brother, also called Lords of the Honor of Alvelos, also took possession of the Paço de Figueiredo das Donas, the first Figueiredo Manor in Portugal, located in the South (now São Pedro do Sul), with the Morgado dos Alvelos surviving through successive female transmissions over the centuries, which always maintained the surname and the Alvelos arms in use in that house, until the termination of the ties in the 19th century. The current genealogical representation of this medieval house is found in the descendants of Francisco de Assis de Melo Lemos e Alvelos, 1st Viscount of Serrado, and 19th Lord of the Morgado of Alvelos, established with a chapel in the Cathedral of Lamego by its Bishop D. Vasco Martins de Alvelos.

== Sources ==
- Manuel Abranches de Soveral, Ascendências Visienses. Ensaio genealógico sobre a nobreza de Viseu. Séculos XIV a XVII (Visonian Descendants: Genealogic Essay on the Nobles of Viseu, 14th and 15th Centuries), Porto 2004, ISBN 972-97430-6-1.

Catholic Church titles
Preceded by John III	Bishop of Lamego; 1297-1302	Succeeded by Alphonse of Asturia (Afonso de Astúrias)
Political offices
Preceded by João Martins	Bishop of Guarda; 1302-1313	Succeeded by Rodrigo III (Roderick III)
