= Cancelos de Baixo =

Coordinates: 40.991°N 7.281°W

Cancelos de Baixo is a hamlet of Portugal, in the district of Guarda and the town of Mêda.

== Agriculture ==
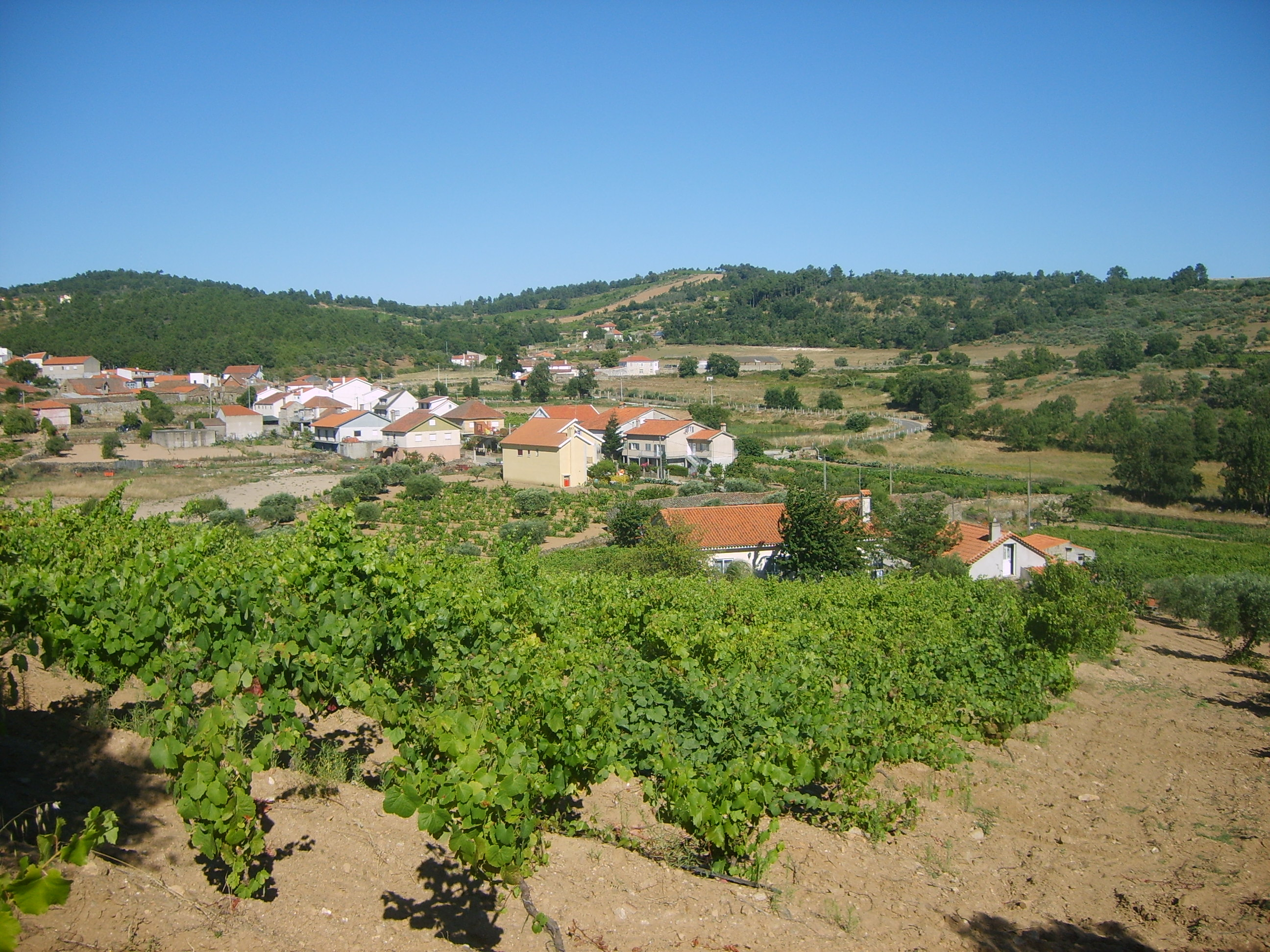
Cancelos de Baixo.

Agriculture is the principal activity in Cancelos de Baixo, including many vineyards. The area produces excellent wine, including varieties of Port (Oporto), as well as traditional red and white wines. In addition, there are olive groves and several types of seasonal farming, such as corn and potatoes, as well as horticultural products (flowers, trees, etc.)

== Historical Sites ==
- Capela Santo António de Cancelos de Baixo
- Fonte do Cancelos de Baixo

== Principal streets ==
- Rua Direita
- EN 324

== Trade ==
Trade does not play a significant role in the economy of Cancelos. There are only the following enterprises:

- The coffee processing company Almeida, which also operates a grocery store.
- The grocer, Francisco.
- A factory which produces windows.

== Climate ==
- In spring the temperature averages 25° to 35 °C.
- In summer the temperature averages 38° to 40 °C.
- With the arrival of autumn the temperature drops to 15° to 25 °C.
- In the winter it ranges from -4° to 10 °C.
