= Guarda Cathedral =

Cathedral in Guarda, Portugal

Coordinates: 40°32′18.01″N 7°16′09.45″W

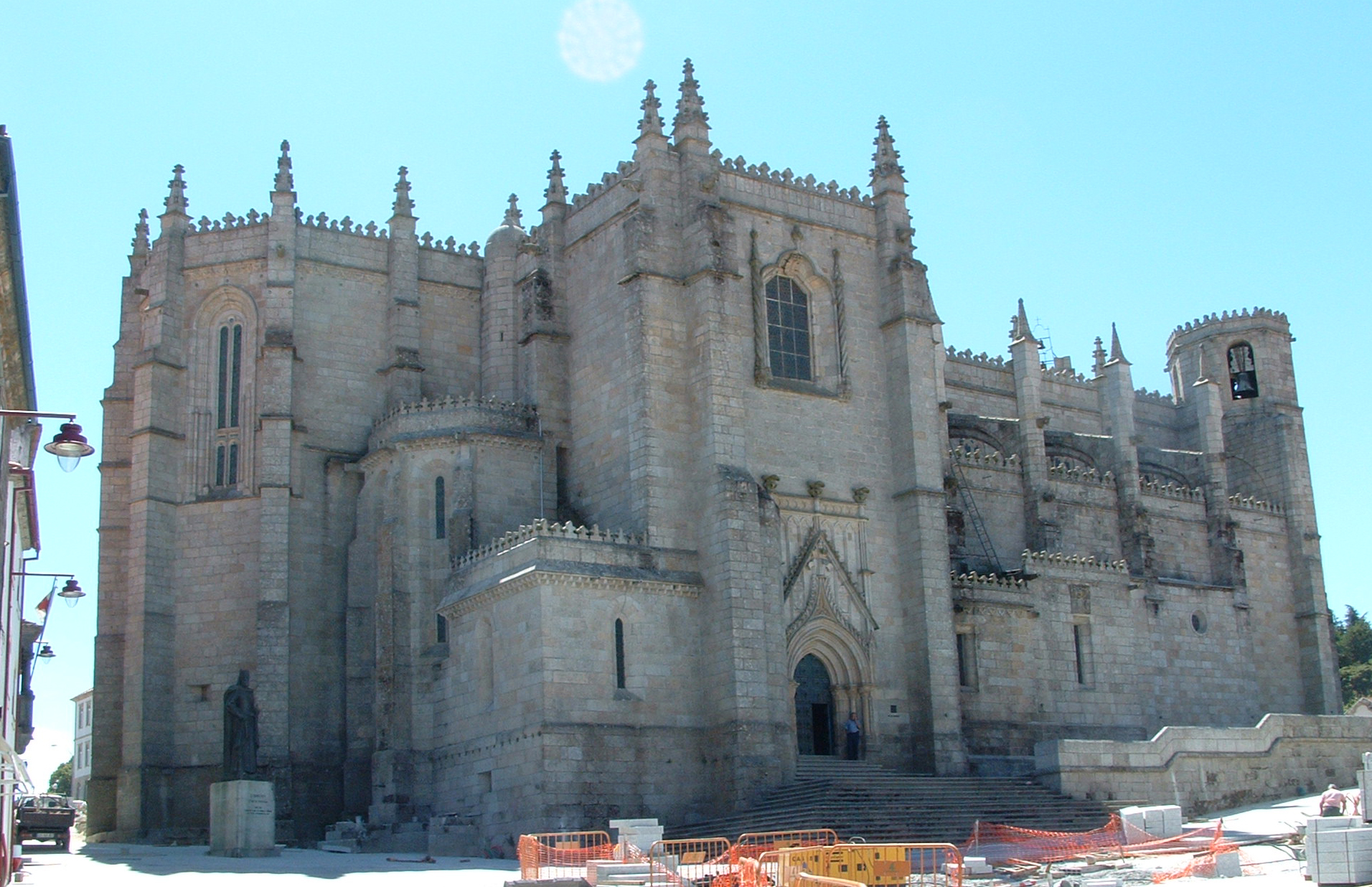
Northern façade of Guarda Cathedral.

The Cathedral of Guarda (Portuguese: Catedral da Guarda, Sé da Guarda) is a Catholic church located in the northeastern city of Guarda, Portugal. Its construction took from 1390 until the mid 16th century, combining Gothic and Manueline architectural styles.

== History ==
The History of Guarda Cathedral begins in 1199, when King Sancho I obtained permission from the Pope to transfer the seat of the bishopric, from nearby Egitania (Idanha-a-Velha) to Guarda. The first cathedral building, in Romanesque style, was soon substituted by another church built on the site occupied today by the Misericórdia Church in Guarda. This second cathedral, of modest proportions and built in the 13th century, was demolished in the second half of the 14th century when the city walls of Guarda were reinforced by King Ferdinand I during the wars with Castile.

The third and definitive Guarda Cathedral started being built in 1390 under bishop Vasco de Lamego, during the reign of King John I. In the early 15th century the apse was built and the nave was begun in Gothic style. In this first stage the works were influenced by the Monastery of Batalha, which was being built at the same time. Construction on the Cathedral proceeded slowly during the second half of the century.

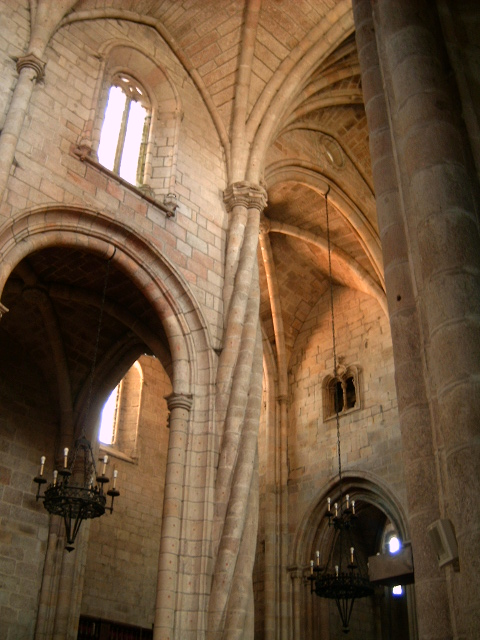
Interior of the cathedral. The typical Manueline spiralling column is visible.

In the period from 1504 to 1517, under bishop Pedro Gavião, the pace of the works increased and the cathedral was almost completed. The architects of this phase were 'Pedro and Felipe Henriques. The Manueline style - a Portuguese mix of Gothic and early Renaissance - was the dominant influence in this second building stage, as attested by the decoration of the windows of the nave and transept, the decorated rib vaulting of the transept, some spiralling columns of the nave as well as the main portal, similar to the Manueline portal of Saint Michael's Chapel of Coimbra University.

Most building activity in Guarda Cathedral was finished around 1540. Around this time, the Renaissance-style Pina Chapel was built as burial site for João de Pina, treasurer of the cathedral. It has a Renaissance portal and a tomb with the recumbent figure of the sponsor of the chapel. Another important addition was the altarpiece of the main chapel, installed in the 1550s. This important Renaissance work was carved in stone by French sculptor João de Ruão, one of the main sculptors from Coimbra.

During the following centuries the cathedral was enriched with other elements. Despite the artistic value of some of these additions - like the Baroque organ - all were removed during a renovation carried out in 1898 by architect Rosendo Carvalheira, which aimed at restoring the cathedral to its primitive, Gothic/Manueline appearance.

== Burials ==
- Pedro Vaz Gaviao, Archbishop (1496–1516)
- Joao De Pina, Treasurer of the Cathedral
