= Castle of Pinhel =

Building in Pinhel, Guarda District, Portugal

Coordinates: 40.777°N 7.062°W

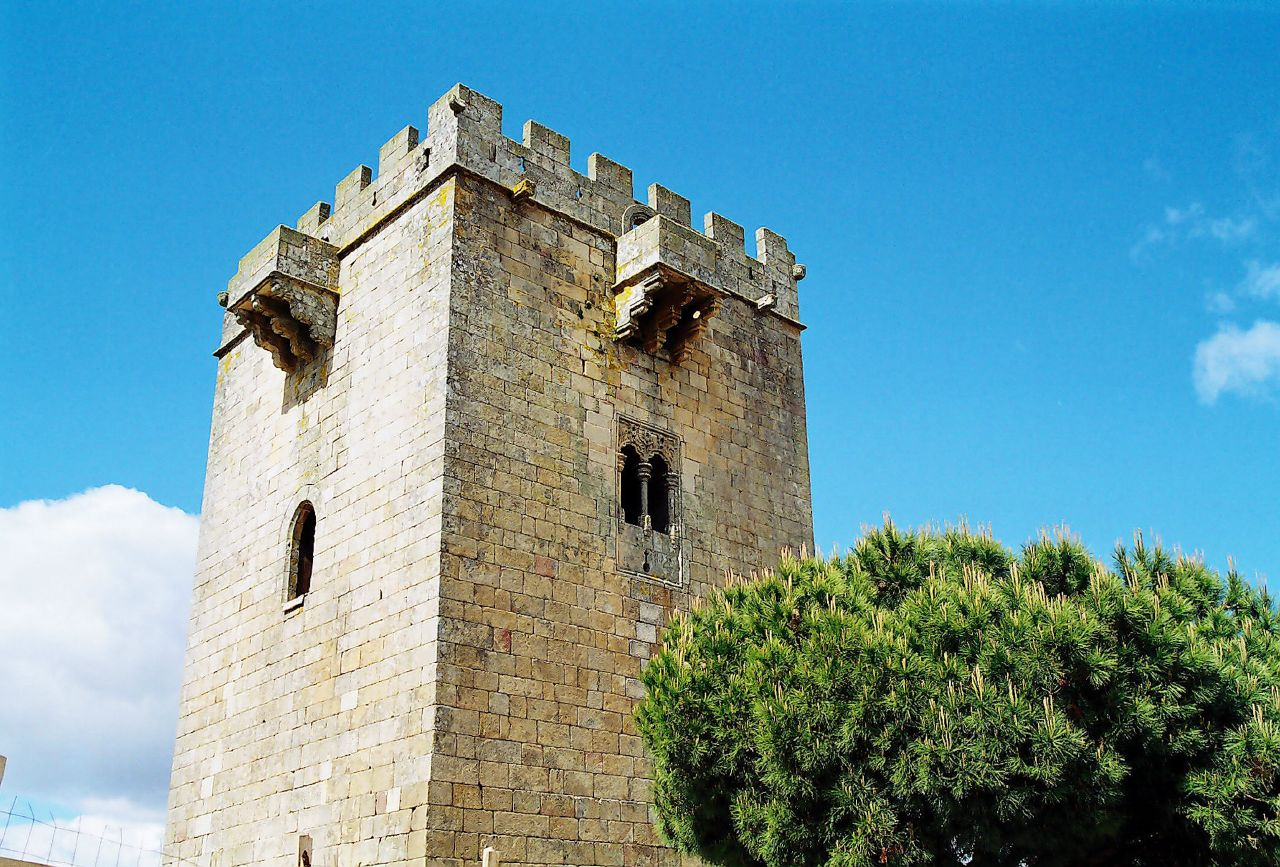
Keep of the Pinhel Castle.

The Castle of Pinhel (Portuguese: Castelo de Pinhel) is a Portuguese castle in the civil parish of Pinhel, in the municipality of Pinhel, central-eastern district of Guarda.

== Importance ==
It has been listed as a Monumento Nacional National monument since 1950. Located in historic Pinhel, often known as Cidade Falcão, on a hill (overlooking the Côa river and Marofa mountain), it is one of the more important castles along the Côa river Valley.
