= Poço do Canto =

- Civil parish
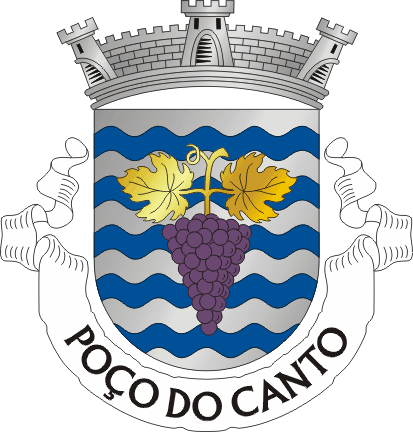
- Coat of arms

- Location in Portugal
- Coordinates: 40.999°N 7.268°W
- Country: Portugal
- Region: Centro
- Intermunic. comm.: Beiras e Serra da Estrela
- District: Guarda
- Municipality: Mêda

Area
  - Total: 16.22 km^{2} (6.26 sq mi)

Population (2011)
  - Total: 443
  - Density: 27/km^{2} (71/sq mi)
- Time zone: UTC+00:00 (WET)
  - Summer (DST): UTC+01:00 (WEST)

Poço do Canto is a freguesia ("civil parish") in the municipality of Mêda, Portugal. The population in 2011 was 443, in an area of 16.22 km^{2}.
