= Américo Henriques =

Portuguese Catholic prelate

The Most Reverend Américo Henriques
- Church: Catholic Church
- See: Diocese of Nova Lisboa
- Appointed: 19 February 1972
- Term ended: 13 April 1976
- Predecessor: Daniel Gomes Junqueira
- Successor: Manuel Franklin da Costa
- Previous posts: Auxiliary Bishop of the Diocese of Lamego (3 July 1966 — 15 April 1967); Titular Bishop of the Titular See of Tisili (3 July 1966 — 2 February 1971); Coadjutor Bishop of the Diocese of Lamego (15 April 1967 — 2 February 1971); Bishop of the Diocese of Lamego (2 February 1971 — 19 February 1972); Bishop of the Diocese of Nova Lisboa (19 February 1972 — 13 April 1976)

Orders
- Ordination: 19 July 1947
- Consecration: 1966 by Maximilien de Furstenberg

Personal details
- Born: 6 October 1923 Portugal
- Died: 14 August 2006 (aged 82)

Américo Henriques (1923—2006) was a Portuguese prelate of the Catholic Church. He served as the second and final Bishop of the Diocese of Nova Lisboa, before its promotion and renaming as the Archdiocese of Huambo.

== Biography ==
Born on 6 October 1923 in Portugal, Américo Henriques was ordained a priest on 19 July 1947 in the Diocese of Lamego.

On 3 July 1966, he was elevated to the prelature as an auxiliary bishop of Lamego. He was consecrated to the episcopacy by Archbishop Maximilien de Furstenberg, who was later elevated to cardinal. He held that position for less than a year before becoming Coadjutor Bishop of the diocese. On 3 February 1966, Henriques was appointed Bishop of the Diocese of Lamego following the retirement of Bishop João da Silva Campos Neves, who had served for more than 20 years. On that same date, he was appointed Titular Bishop of the Titular See of Tisili, and was ordained to the position on 11 October 1966.

He served in that position for a little more than a year, before being appointed Bishop of the Diocese of Nova Lisboa in what is now Angola on 2 February 1971. He was the second and last bishop of that diocese, as it was promoted and renamed the Archdiocese of Huambo following his retirement on 13 April 1976.

He died on 14 August 2006 at the age of 82.
