= Beira Interior Norte =

Coordinates: 40.535942°N 7.270848°W

Map showing the location of the Beira Interior Norte subregion

Beira Interior Norte (European Portuguese pronunciation: [ˈbɐjɾɐ ĩtɨɾiˈoɾ ˈnɔɾtɨ]) is a former Portuguese subregion (NUTS level 3) in the Centro Region. It was abolished at the January 2015 NUTS 3 revision. It was also part of an urban community (ComUrb) called Beiras. The capital and most important city was Guarda (city population approximately 32,000). Other towns with Portuguese city status (cidade) included: Pinhel (3,500), Sabugal (3,200), Trancoso (3,000) and Mêda (2,004).

The subregion had 9 municipalities and its population was 112,766 (2005 statistics).

== Municipalities ==
The municipalities are:

- Almeida
- Celorico da Beira
- Figueira de Castelo Rodrigo
- Guarda
- Manteigas
- Mêda
- Pinhel
- Sabugal
- Trancoso
