= Alvelos =

- Civil parish
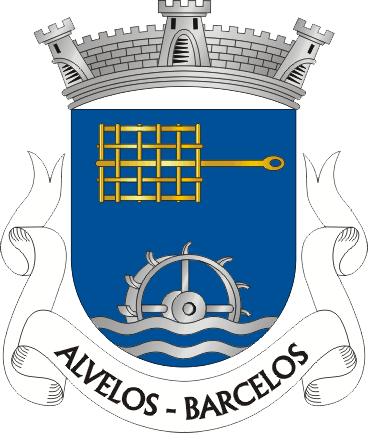
- Coat of arms

- Location in Portugal
- Coordinates: 41.529°N 8.622°W
- Country: Portugal
- Region: Norte
- Intermunic. comm.: Cávado
- District: Braga
- Municipality: Barcelos

Area
  - Total: 3.38 km^{2} (1.31 sq mi)

Population (2011)
  - Total: 2,145
  - Density: 635/km^{2} (1,640/sq mi)
- Time zone: UTC+00:00 (WET)
  - Summer (DST): UTC+01:00 (WEST)
- Website: http://www.alvelos.maisbarcelos.pt/

Alvelos is a Portuguese freguesia ("civil parish"), located in the municipality of Barcelos. The population in 2011 was 2,145, in an area of 3.38 km^{2} (1.31 sq mi).

People are active in a number of sport and cultural associations. The Associação Recreativa Aguias Futebol Clube de Alvelos, founded on February 5, 1961, and the youth association, Mais Juventude, founded in 2005, are the associations with the most activity in the region.

The majority of the population is Roman Catholic and the religion still has an important role on people's daily life.

== Historical Monuments ==
Alvelos has many historical monuments of which most are associated with religious purposes. The Alvelos Church is probably the most important historical site of the parish. Some other monuments are the Chapel of Nossa Senhora das Dores, Chapel of Senhor dos Passos, Chapel of Santa Cruz and Chapel of Socorro.

== Sports ==
Águias F.C. Alvelos is a soccer team and its senior squad team plays in a secondary regional division. Currently, it also has several youth squads.

== Youth Associations ==
In Alvelos several associations have come up during the last decade as result of an active population. The youth association "Mais Juventude" was founded in 2005 by a group of five friends (Elói Figueiredo, Élio Silva, Hugo Sousa, João Sá, and José Carlos Martins) who were willing to support and promote ideas of young people in favor of the parish. The main goal of this association is to promote sport and cultural activities among the inhabitants of Alvelos and surroundings.

The organization of the annual "Carnaval de Alvelos" has been one of the main activities of the "Mais Juventude". It has attracted numerous people from several other parishes of Barcelos. The Carnival has been one of the central events (along with the annual "Festa da nossa Senhora das Dores") for many artists who spend several days getting ready for the Sunday parade. As a street parade and festival, the show is full of vibrant color. Its theme is often centered in social, cultural and political events.

== Statues ==
The construction of two public sculptures (Nossa Senhora das Dores and S. Lorenço) has begun to replace two other monuments located in front of the Church. Although these new landmarks are funded by public donations, their relevancy for the parish are still a controversial issue among the population, especially due to their large initial budget.
