= Church of São Luís (Pinhel) =

- Parochial Church of Pinhel
- Igreja de São Luís
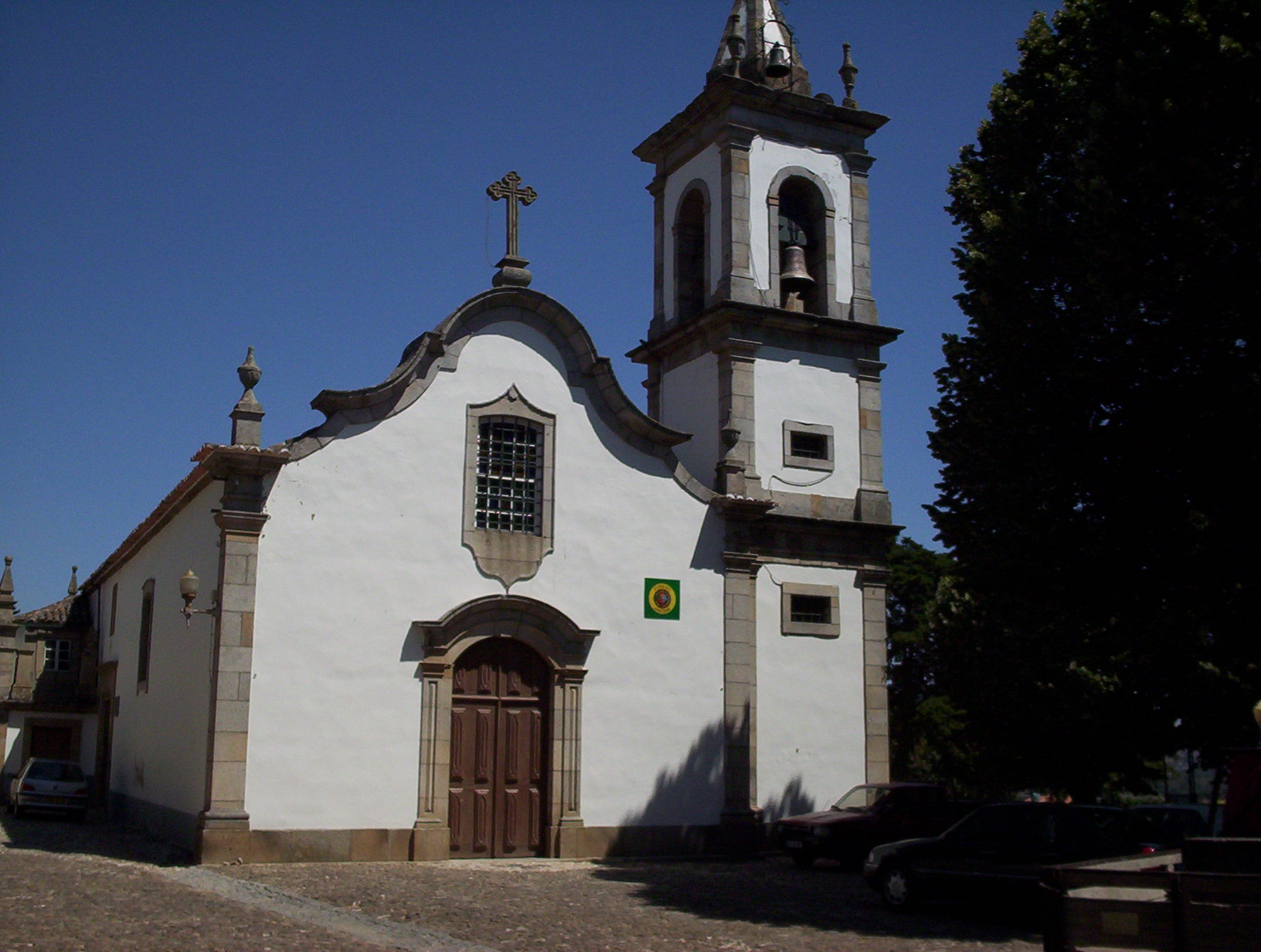
- A view of the front facade of the Church of São Luís in the Praça Sacadura Cabral
- Church of São Luís
- 40°46′30.8″N 7°3′44.8″W
- Location: Guarda, Beira Interior Sul, Centro
- Country: Portugal
- Denomination: Roman Catholic

History
- Dedication: Pinhel

Architecture
- Architect: Oficina Fernandes
- Style: Baroque

Administration
- Diocese: Diocese of Guarda

The Church of São Luís (Portuguese: Igreja de São Luís) is a Latin Catholic Baroque church and former cathedral in the civil parish of Pinhel, in the municipality of the same name, Portuguese district of Guarda.

== History ==
=== Convent ===
The church and monastery of São Luís was founded in 1596, for the Poor Clares sisters by Luís de Figueiredo Falcão. At its founding, it was stipulated that he and his descendants should be buried in the monastery and that the family's coat-of-arms should be inscribed into the walls of the structure. Also, his sister, who was abbess would remain in that position for life, moving from the Convent of Santa Clara in Guarda to take-up her residence, along with 33 other clerics (ten of which were selected by the new abbess) and a stipend of 20$000 réis. It was further stipulated that the convent would be closed to the public and only visited by close family members. The monastery would have an annual rent of 100$000 and 16 moios of bread allocated to the religious sisters.

On 5 December 1602, the convent was transferred to the Order of St. Francis, creating a quarrel between the founder and various prelates, who wanted to expand the monastery. Only in October of the following year the first nuns began to enter the institution. Successive conflicts with the bishop over the status of the sisters, that resulted in the interdiction of the monastery.

In the 17th century, the box-ceiling and retable altar was finally installed in the church, along with azulejo tiles in the presbytery. Religious reliquaries were gifted by Pope Paul V in 1620, consisting of artifacts associated with São Caio Papa, São Vital, Santa Teodora and Santa Cristina.

Its founder, Luís Falcão, was buried onsite in 1631. Within another 15 years his son, António de Figueirdo Falcão would also be buried.

An image of St. Joseph was commissioned in the 18th century.

=== Cathedral ===
Between 1797 and 1828, it was elevated to the status of cathedral of the Diocese of Pinhel by order of its Bishop Don Bernardo Bernardino Beltrão Freire (1797.12.18 – 1828.07.19) following the demolition of the Church of the Saviour (Portuguese: Igreja do Salvador). Work in the interior advanced during this period, with the reconstruction of the principal facade and the addition of a high choir occurring in 1808.

In 1836, though, the convent was extinguished, and the church began to serve as a parochial church. During this era, around 1862, a bell-tower was installed by a local master mason.

=== Simple parish church ===
By papal bull, dated 30 September 1881, Pope Leo XIII extinguished the diocese of Pinhel,merging its territory into the Diocese of Guarda, but in 1969 the see of Pinhel was nominally restored as Episcopal Titular bishopric.

Although a new organ was installed in 1906, following the declaration of the Portuguese Republic, the monastery structures were adapted to function as a teatro, courthouse and other public institutions, while the circus was transformed into public square. The Church of the Misericórdia were also party of the property and possessions of the old monastery.

Between 1904 and 1906, the French-style organ was installed by António Joaquim Claro, while a new bell from Oficina Fernandes from Trancoso.

In 1916, the Arrolamento dos Bens da Freguesia de Pinhel referred to the many vestiges and artefacts, that included a marble crucifix, a new baptistry, a gold-gilded cabinet and three reliquaries, as well images of the Sacred Heart of Jesus, Our Lady of the Encounter, Immaculate Conception (in the hospital chapel), St. Anthony, St. Claire and Saviour (in the Church of Santa Maria), St. Agnes of Rome (from the 17th century) and three bells.

Between 1968 and 1969, there was work on the altars, ambers and pavements, by master mason Albino Alves Hermenigil.

On 6 January 1977, there was a proposal by the DGPC Direção-Geral de Patrimonio Cultural.

The early 20th century organ was restores in 1988, while a new high-choir was constructed over granite. Work on restoring the organ was undertaken by António Simões, supported by the Secretary-of-State for Culture in 1989.

In 1998, a study was elaborated to construct a sacred art museum and a new parochial registry in an annex of the church.

On 22 August 1980, the IPPC Commission proposed classifying the site as an Imóvel de Interesse Público (Property of Public Interest).

== Architecture ==
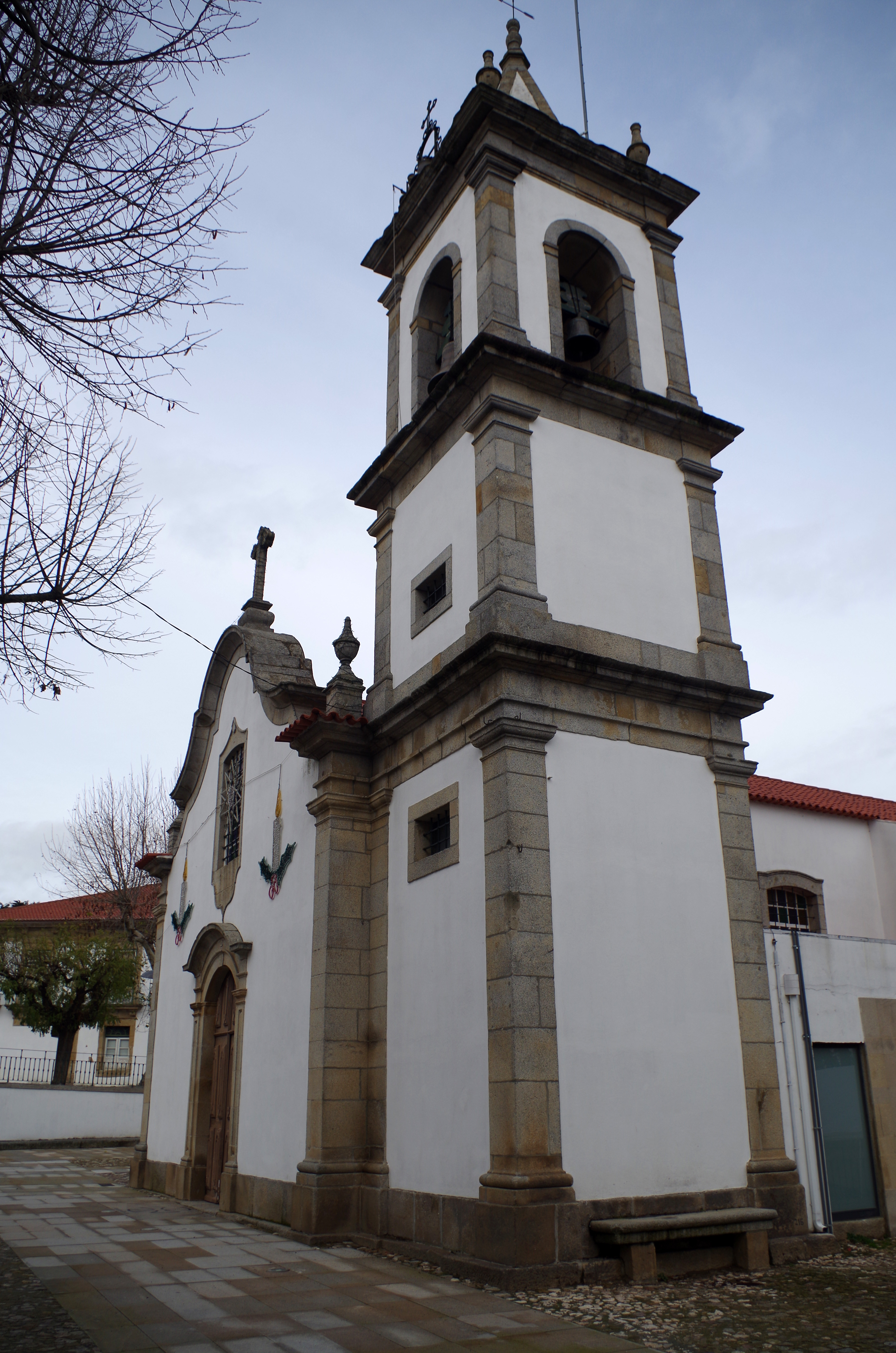
An oblique view of the front facade

The church is located in an urban area, situated in an open square, near the historical pillory and the manorhouse of Antas e Meneses (the municipal palace/hall) addorsed to the Church of the Misericórdia. The monastery occupied the present garden, club, theater, court, secretariat and jail.

The longitudinal plan composed of two juxtapositioned rectangles, a rectangular bell tower, two annexes to the south, and sacristy to the north. The principal facade was oriented to the west with prominent foundation. On the first register is an arched portico flanked by framed pilasters and surmounted by a friese dating back to 1808, and the second floor with large window with curvilinear frame. The three-storey tower is divided by friezes with small rectangular windows on each register and a belfry on the third register, crowned by pyramidal ceiling.

=== Interior ===
In the body of the nave (divided into two registers), there appears, on the first, an adjoining annex and in the upper two, arched windows. The volume of the main chapel also includes an attached/adjoining annex and in the upper register, two straight windows, decorated by cornices. The north facade, in the body of the nave, is a straight portal and half-cane frame surmounted by a protruding frieze and bowed arch with straight window, decorated by the coat-of-arms. In the volume of the chancel, the sacristy appears with two straight windows, decorated with cornices. The blind eastern wall is topped by gable with cornice.

The nave is illuminated by two windows to south and north. On the south side is a pulpit with a square base of stonework and a decorated balcony. It integrates two symmetrical altars, embedded in arches full of stonework and with retables in gilded carving and painted boards. Preceding the main chapel is a triumphal arch that leads into a structure illuminated by two windows to the north and south, with floor slabs and a ceiling covered in 35 panels (7 in the transverse direction and 5 in the longitudinal direction) painted with Marian scenes. On the north side, there is a straight door surmounted by archesolol in an arch with an inscription and topped by coat-of-arms in Ançã stone, opposited by straight door surmounted by arcosolol (similar to the previous one). The walls are fully lined with geometric patterns, polychromatic tile and stylized vegetal motifs. The retable of the main altar in gilded carvings and painted board depicting Christ.

== Sources and external links ==
- GCatholic, with Google satellite photo - Igreja de São Luís
- GCatholic - episcopal see of Pinhel
- Leal, Pinho, Portugal Antigo e Moderno, Lisboa, 1873 (in Portuguese)
- Castro, Osório da Gama e (1902), Diocese e Distrito da Guarda (in Portuguese), Porto, Portugal
- Marta, Ilídio (1943), Pinhel Falcão (in Portuguese), Celorico da Beira, Portugal
- Bigotte, Quelhas (1948), O Culto de Nossa Senhora na Diocese da Guarda (in Portuguese), Lisbon, Portugal
- Almeida, José António Ferreira de (1980), Tesouros Artísticos de Portugal (in Portuguese), Lisbon, Portugal
- Plano da Área Territorial da Guarda, Património Artístico - Cultural, Situação Actual, Concelho de Pinhel (in Portuguese), Lisbon, Portugal: Direcção-Geral do Planeamento Urbanístico, 1984
- Valença, Manuel (1990), A Arte Organística em Portugal (in Portuguese), vol. II, Braga, Portugal
- Marta, Ilídio S. (1993), Perfil de Pinhelenses (in Portuguese), Pinhel, Portugal
- Vaz, Padre Francisco (1995), Santa Maria de Pinhel (in Portuguese), Lisbon, Portugal
- "Intervenção de fundo na Igreja de São Luís", Terras da Beira (in Portuguese), 17 August 2006
