= Mêda =

- Municipality
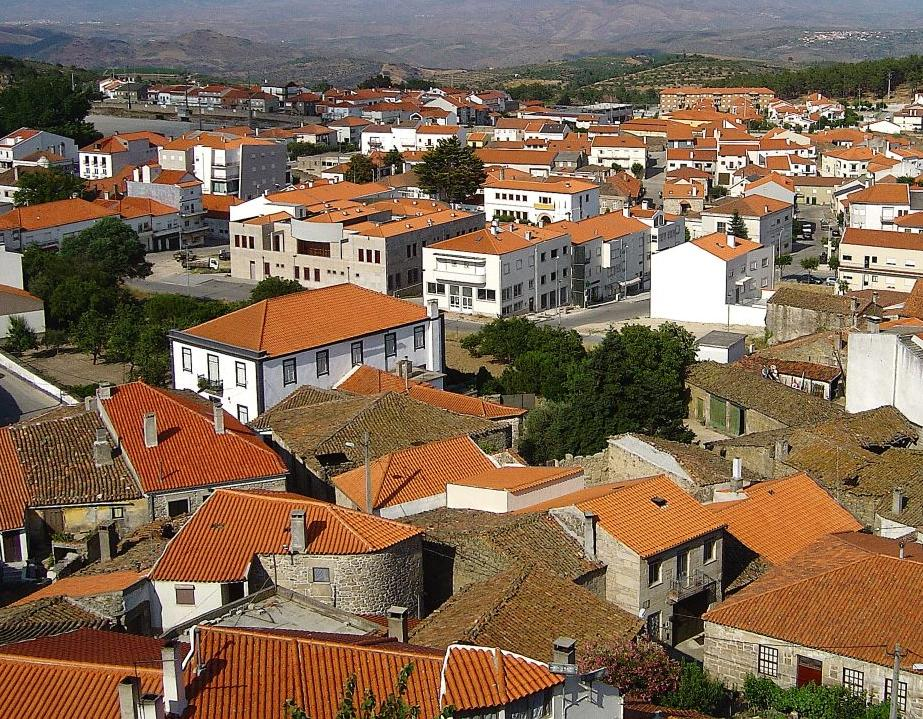

- Flag Coat of arms
- Interactive map of Mêda
- Coordinates: 40°58′N 7°16′W
- Country: Portugal
- Region: Centro
- Intermunic. comm.: Beiras e Serra da Estrela
- District: Guarda
- Parishes: 11

Government
  - President: João Leal Pinto (PSD)

Area
  - Total: 286.05 km^{2} (110.44 sq mi)

Population (2011)
  - Total: 5,202
  - Density: 18.19/km^{2} (47.10/sq mi)
- Time zone: UTC+00:00 (WET)
  - Summer (DST): UTC+01:00 (WEST)
- Local holiday: November 11
- Website: http://www.cm-meda.pt

Mêda (European Portuguese pronunciation: [ˈmeðɐ]) is a municipality in Portugal. The population in 2011 was 5,202, in an area of 286.05 km^{2}. The city of Mêda proper had a population of 2,004 in 2001. It was promoted to city in December 2004.

== Municipality ==
The municipality is located in Guarda District, Centro Region, Beira Interior Norte Subregion. The present Mayor is Anselmo Sousa. The municipal holiday is November 11.

Main monument:

- Marialva Castle/Castelo de Marialva.

Also nearby in the municipalities of Foz Côa and Pinhel is the: Prehistoric Rock-Art Site of the Côa Valley, a World Heritage site.

== Parishes ==
Administratively, the municipality is divided into 11 civil parishes (freguesias):

- Aveloso
- Barreira
- Coriscada
- Dipsy
- Marialva
- Mêda, Outeiro de Gatos e Fonte Longa
- Poço do Canto
- Prova e Casteição
- Rabaçal
- Ranhados
- Vale Flor, Carvalhal e Pai Penela

== See also ==
- Cancelos de Baixo
