= Idanha-a-Velha =

- Civil parish
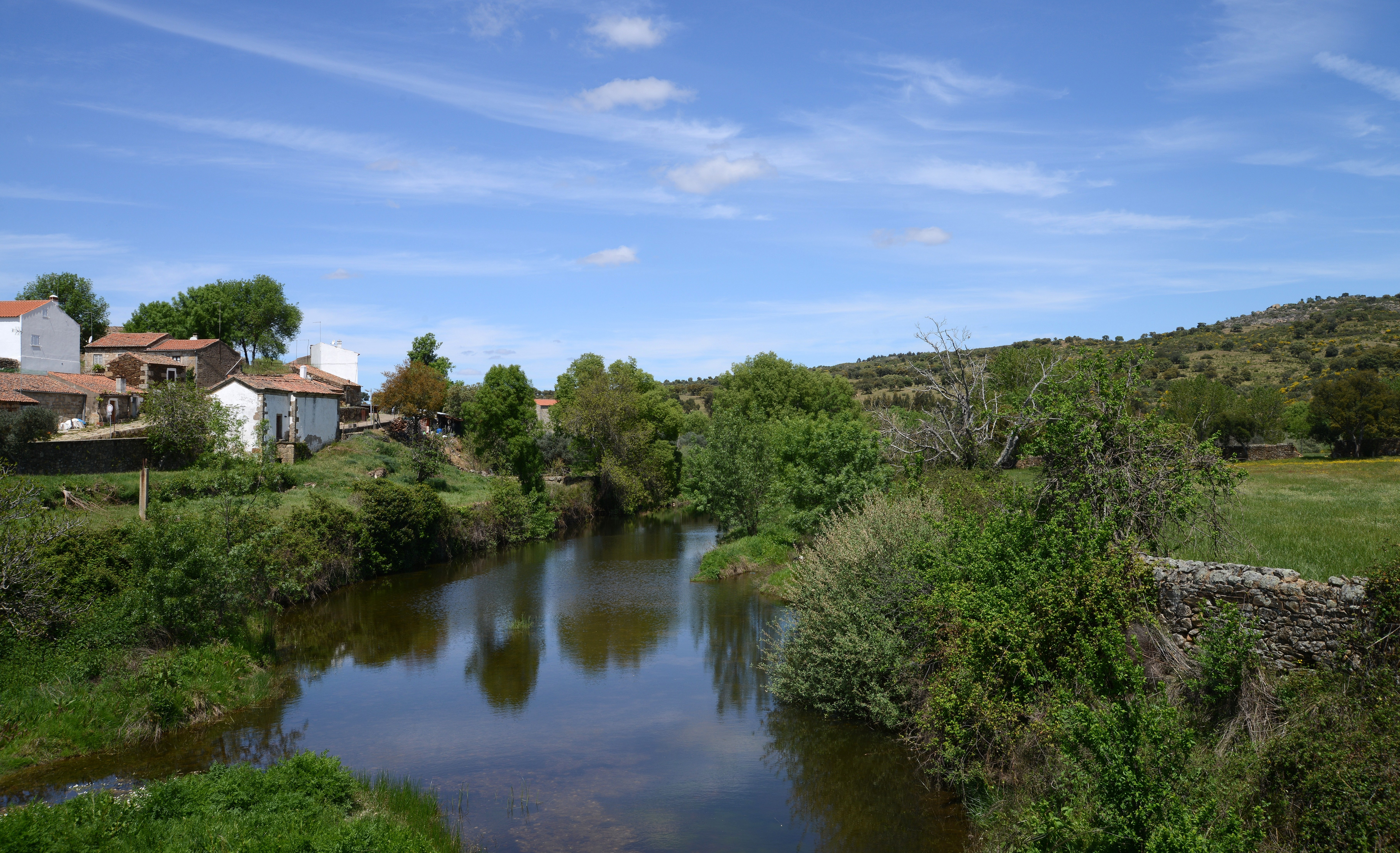
- View of the village, with River Ponsul

- Location in Portugal
- Coordinates: 39.997°N 7.144°W
- Country: Portugal
- Region: Centro
- Intermunic. comm.: Beira Baixa
- District: Castelo Branco
- Municipality: Idanha-a-Nova
- Disbanded: 2013

Area
  - Total: 20.98 km^{2} (8.10 sq mi)

Population (2001)
  - Total: 79
  - Density: 3.8/km^{2} (9.8/sq mi)
- Time zone: UTC+00:00 (WET)
  - Summer (DST): UTC+01:00 (WEST)
- Website: www.cm-idanhanova.pt

Idanha-a-Velha (Idanha "the old") is a village in the civil parish (freguesia) of Monsanto e Idanha-a-Velha, in the municipality of Idanha-a-Nova (Idanha "the new"), central eastern Portugal, and the site of ancient Egitânia, a former bishopric. It covers an area of 20.98 km^{2} and had a population of 79 as of 2001.

It stands in a place where a Roman city located along the Ponsul River once lay, the regional capital of Civitas Igaeditanorum (1st century BC) under the Romans and later the episcopal seat during occupation by the Suebi and Visigoths.

The Muslim invasion of Iberia in the early eighth century and the subsequent wars of Christian reconquest brought with it a setback to the development of the city which before the Muslim invasion was home for thousands of inhabitants. It was occupied by Muslims in the 8th century who called it Exitânia and taken back by Christians in the 12th century.

It was donated to the Knights Templar in the 13th century and still has traces of different ages that attest to permanent occupation by various civilizations.

== History ==
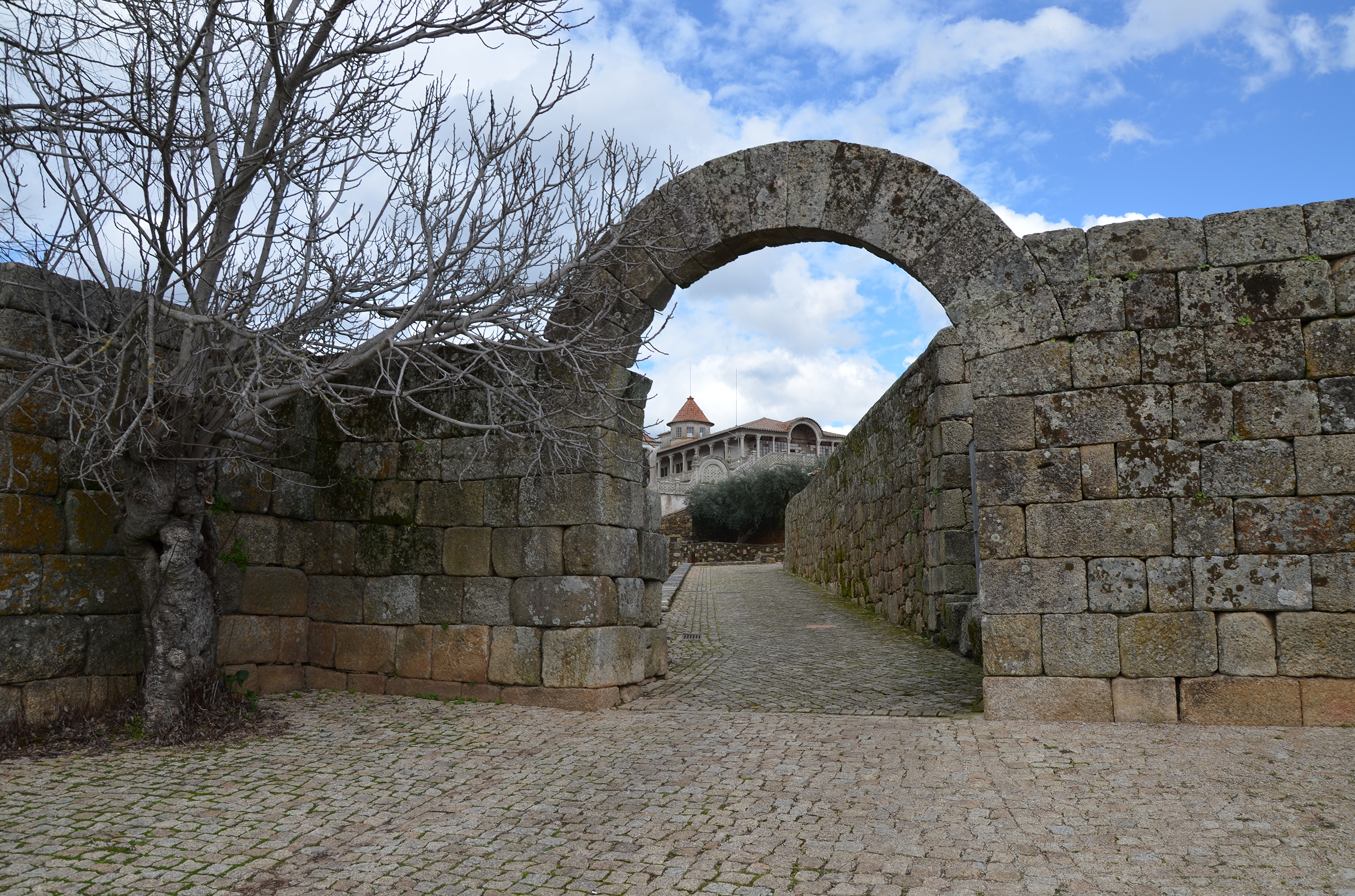
Roman arch of Civitas Igaeditanorum

As one of the oldest towns in Portugal, with a history of Roman settlement recorded since the year 16 AD, Idanha-a-Velha (Idanha "the old") has been described as a "modest village with a rich historical background".

Idanha-a-Velha is built on the site of the city of Egitânia (Civitas Igaeditanorum), which previously had thousands of inhabitants.

The town was repeatedly invaded and looted throughout history, and the ruins evince the influence of different periods of its history: buildings from the Pre-History, Celtic, Classic Roman when it was called Civitas Igaeditanorum, Suebic, Visigothic when it was called Egitânia, Moorish, Medieval and Portuguese Manueline periods.

The town is reputed to have possibly been the birthplace of the famous Visigothic King Wamba, as well as the fourth century Saint Pope Damasus. The Visigoth King Roderic is also said to have been buried here.

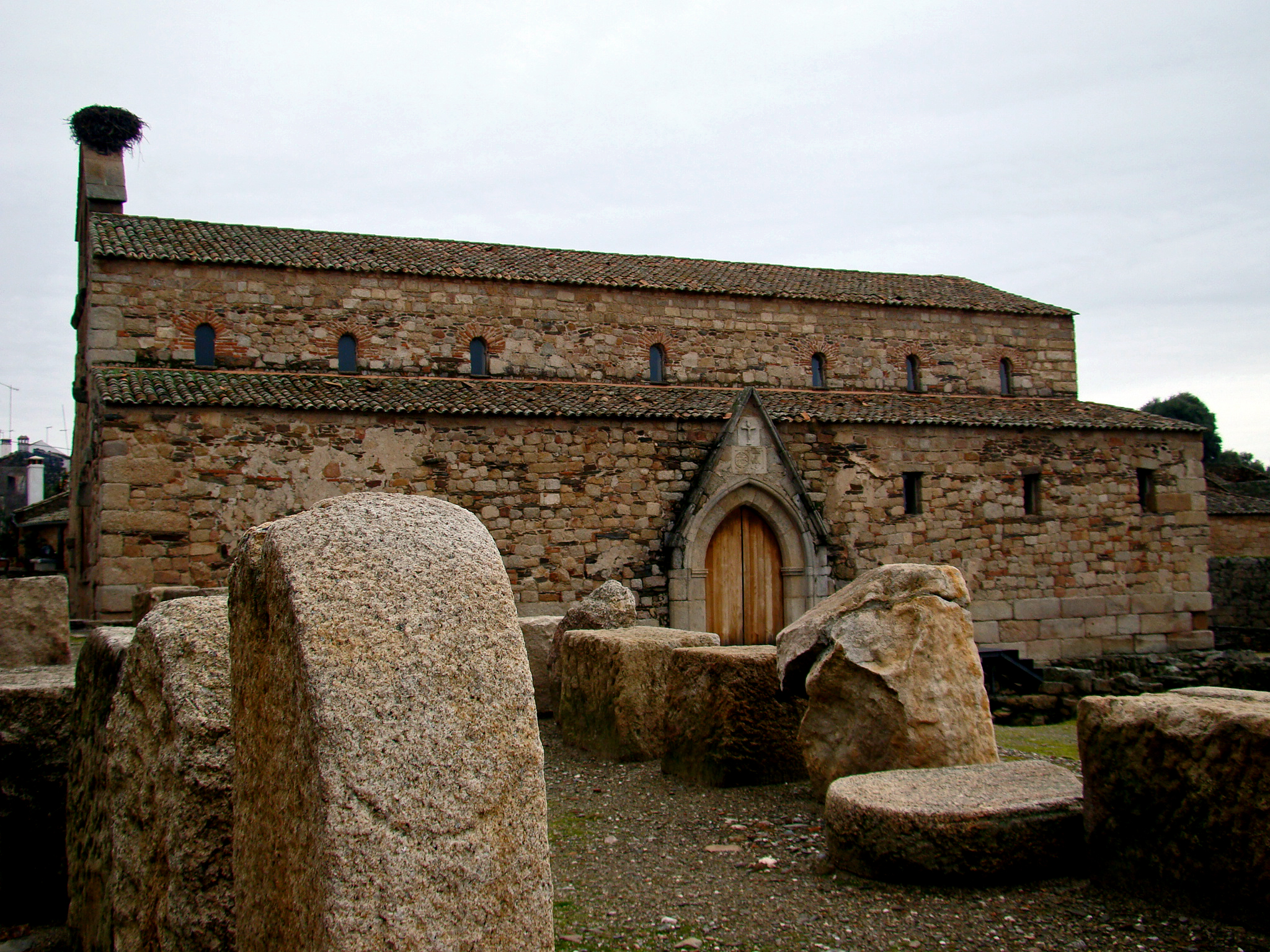
The former cathedral of Idanha-a-Velha and stork’s nest, as seen from the cemetery

The town is host to a restored 16th century church, called "the Cathedral", built on ruins dating from the time of the Suebi, as far back as to the fourth century — the first Visigothic cathedral built on the Iberian Peninsula.

Near the cathedral is the largest collection of Roman epigraphs in Europe, in an ancient building refurbished as a modern museum to contain the carved and inscribed Roman stones.

The Roman epigraphic collection in Idanha-a-Velha is one of the largest and most representative in Portugal. It was compiled during different phases of archaeological investigation in the village. It is located in the grounds of the old olive press in the south-eastern part of the village and was set up to show the collection, which before was at Santa Maria Church or the Cathedral. The new museum project made it possible to study and publish this important collection and organise the exhibition Verba Volant, Scripta Manent (words fly but writing endures). Eighty-six of the 210 pieces are on display, harmonizing traditional exhibition techniques with multimedia technology. Scientific accuracy made it necessary to offer effective access to the contents to a wide audience and so an interactive exhibition was designed where technology helps to contextualize and interpret the pieces. This project encourages the use of local heritage through scientific research, preservation of archaeological findings and the use of new technology to meet the needs of qualified tourism for the location.

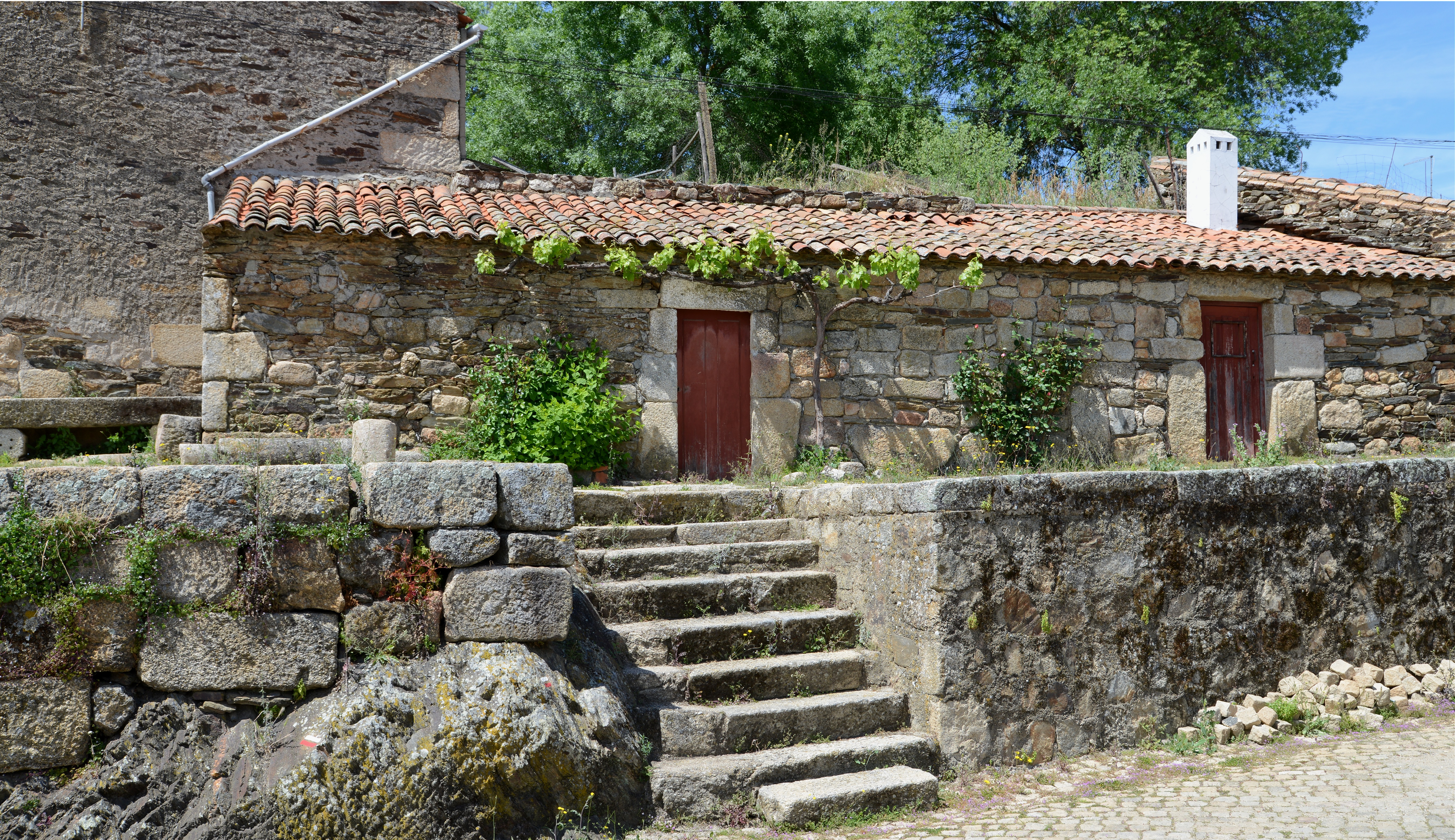
Typical granite house

There is also a 17th-century pillory in the village square. Nearby stand the ruins of a Torre dos Templários, a tower constructed on the ruins of a Roman temple dedicated to Venus.

It was part of the civil parish of Alcafozes from 1900 to the early 1930s. In 2013, the civil parish of Idanha-a-Velha merged into the new parish Monsanto e Idanha-a-Velha.

=== Ecclesiastical History ===
The presence of a primitive basilica (Roman church) constructed in the 4th century influenced King Theodemar of the Suebic Kingdom of Galicia (+570) to choose this town as see when he created the Diocese of Egitânia no later than 559–569.

Around 585, the Romanesque cathedral started to be constructed, that included not only the main structure by the baptistery and the hypothetical palace. That was also the year that Suebic Galicia was annexed by the Visigoths, and was turned into the sixth province of the Visigothic Kingdom of Hispania.

In 715 however, the diocese was suppressed (possibly with an apostolic succession of errant bishops), due to the Moorish invasion of Iberia, rendering the church's cathedral function moot. Between the 9th and 10th century, during the Moorish occupation, the temple was transformed into a mosque.

When the bishopric could finally be restored in 1199 (after the Reconquista), initially at Idanha-a-Velha, its apostolic succession was assigned to a new see, after which it was (re)named Diocese of Guarda, where a new cathedral was built, while the former cathedral at Idanha-a-Velha, which had served local purposes, notably under Knights Templar influence, was not even made a co-cathedral.

Suffragan Bishops of Egitânia

- Adorico (550?569 – 572?)
- Comundo (? – 589)
- Licério (? – 610)
- Montésis (? – 638)
- Arménio (? – 646)
- Siclua (? – 666)
- Monefonso (? – 688)
- Argesindo (? – 693)
- Rodrigo (1199–1199)

== See also ==
- Idanha-a-Nova
- List of Catholic dioceses in Portugal

== Sources and external links ==
- Freguesias - Idanha-a-Velha (in Portuguese)
- GCatholic - Egaria bishopric
- Catedral Visigótica de Idanha-a-Velha
