= Diocese of Lamego =

Roman Catholic diocese in Portugal

Diocese of Lamego Dioecesis Lamacensis Diocese de Lamego

Catholic
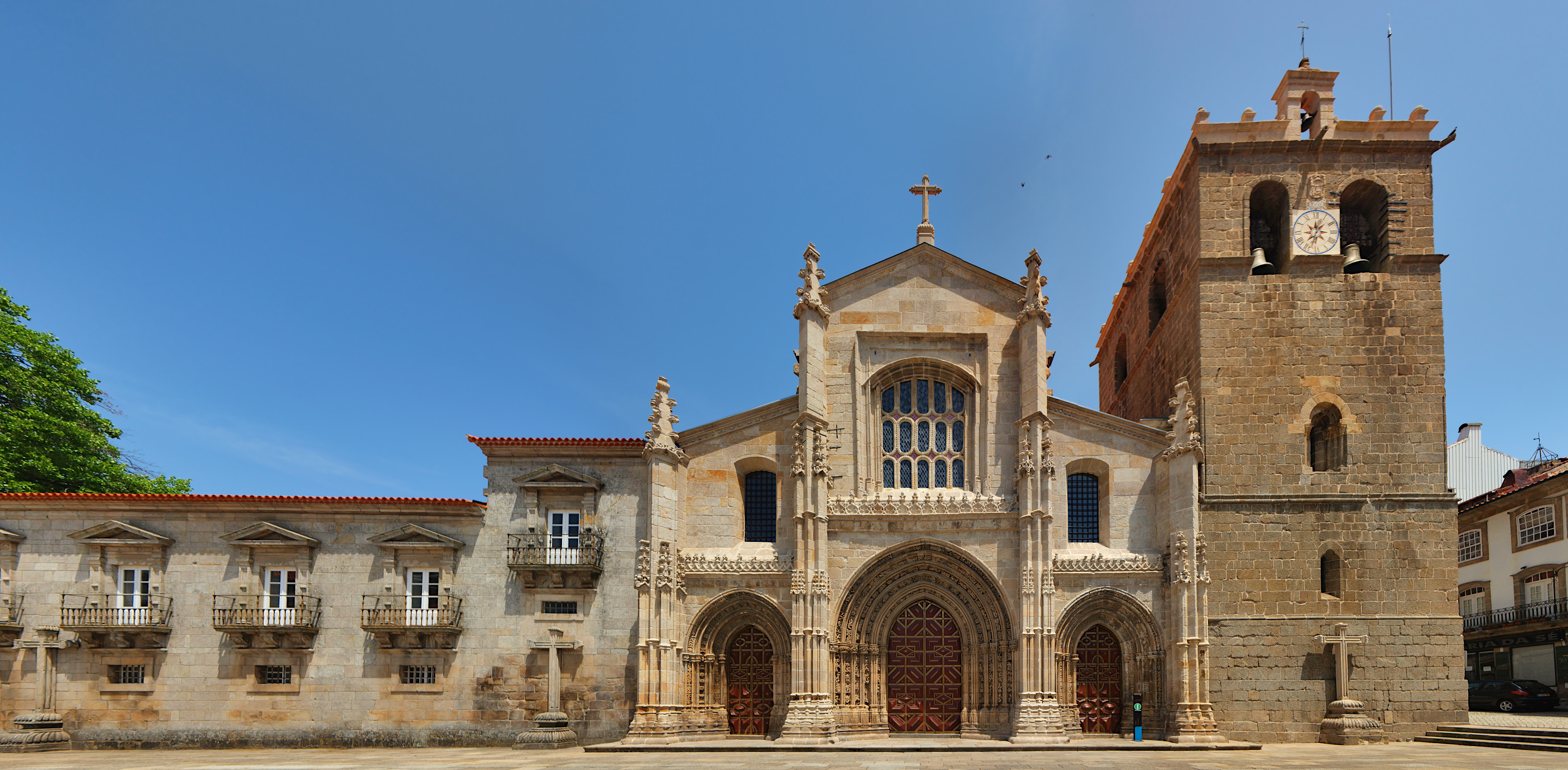
- Cathedral of Our Lady of the Assumption

Location
- Country: Portugal
- Ecclesiastical province: Braga
- Metropolitan: Archdiocese of Braga
- Coordinates: 41°5′47.6844″N 7°48′23.4252″W

Statistics
- Area: 2,848 km^{2} (1,100 sq mi)
- Population: Total; Catholics: (as of 2013); 160,700; 157,500 (98.0%)

Information
- Denomination: Roman Catholic
- Sui iuris church: Latin Church
- Rite: Roman Rite
- Established: 569
- Cathedral: Cathedral of Our Lady of the Assumption

Current leadership
- Pope: Leo XIV
- Bishop: António José da Rocha Couto, SMP
- Metropolitan Archbishop: Jorge IV
- Bishops emeritus: Jacinto Tomás de Carvalho Botelho Bishop Emeritus (2000-2011)

Map

Website
- http://www.diocese-lamego.pt

The Diocese of Lamego (Latin: Dioecesis Lamacensis) is a Latin Church diocese of the Catholic Church in Portugal.

== History ==
Lamego became Catholic when the Visigothic king Reccared I converted to Catholicism. According to local tradition, the city of Lamego received the Gospel from either St. James the Greater or St. Paul. Some Portuguese authorities name St. Peter of Rates as the first Bishop of Lamego during the middle of the 1st century, and later the first Bishop of Braga, purportedly appointed by St. James, though this theory is probably a myth, given that it is proven that St. James was celebrating Easter in Jerusalem precisely the same year.

The true origins of the diocese start with Bishop Sardinário (or Sardinarius), whose signature from the Second Council of Braga in 572 exists among the suffragan bishops of Archbishop Martin of Braga. Just three years before this, at the Council of Lugo in 569, several new dioceses were created. Hence, it is very likely that the Diocese of Lamego was established between 569 and 572. Very little about the diocese's early history. Some of the early bishops' names are known, but nearly nothing else: Philippus (c. 580–89), Profuturus (c. 630–38), Witaricus (c. 646), and Filimirus (653–56).

From 693 to 876 it is unknown who the bishops of Lamego were. Upon the Moorish invasion in 714, the Bishop of Lamego was forced to flee northbound to the region of Galicia in the northern Iberian Peninsula. In 876, the first known Bishop of Lamego in nearly 200 years is Argimirus, who was still reigning as late as 899, when he partook in the consecration of the cathedral of Compostela. Argimirus was known to have resided in the Diocese of Lamego, but it is uncertain whether other bishops of Lamego actually stayed in the city. It is likely that they were only titular bishops after the invasion, especially because the Moors destroyed the city in 982.

Ferdinand the Great of León recaptured the city in 1057 and the Diocese of Lamego was able to function normally again. Despite this, for several decades, the seat of the bishop appears to have been empty for several decades around the late 11th century and early 12th century. In 1143, King Alfonso I of Portugal reestablished the Diocese of Lamego and Mend Godinus, an Augustinian friar, became the new bishop.

On 30 September 1881, Pope Leo XIII by the Bull "Gravissimum" placed the Diocese of Lamego under the metropolitan of the Archdiocese of Braga.

As of 1909, the Diocese of Lamego had 273,741 inhabitants, almost entirely Catholic, 283 parishes, 283 parish churches, 1144 public chapels, 314 diocesan priests, one secondary school for boys run by Benedictines; two convents of Franciscan nuns, and one convent of the Sisters of St. Joseph of Cluny.

== Ordinaries ==
- Sardinário (c. 569 — 572)
- Philippus (c. 580 — 589)
- Profuturus (c. 630 —638)
- Witaricus (c. 646)
- Filimirus (c. 653 — 656)
- Argimirus (c. 876 — 899)
- Brandericus
- Pantaleon
- Jacobus
- Peter (c. 1071)
- Mend Godinus, OSA (1143 — 1176)
- Alfonso das Asturias (14 February 1302 — 3 November 1306)
- Diego Fernandi (3 November 1306 — 14 May 1311)
- Martin Pedro (24 September 1477 — 1478)
- Antonio Pallavicini Gentili (26 March 1492 — 20 March 1493)
- Fernando de Menezes Coutinho e Vasconcellos (26 August 1513 — 24 September 1540)
- Agostinho Ribeiro (1540 — 24 March 1549)
- Simão de Sá Pereira (28 February 1575 — 13 November 1579)
- Martim Afonso de Melo (19 July 1599 — October 1613)
- Martin Alphonso Mexia de Tovar (1 June 1615 — 2 December 1619)
- João de Lencastre (21 July 1622 — 13 January 1626)
- João Coutinho (14 June 1627 — 3 December 1635)
- Miguel de Portugal (14 May 1636 — 13 January 1644)
- Luís de Sousa (15 December 1670 — 8 February 1677)
- Luís da Silva Teles, OSST (8 March 1677 — 9 April 1685)
- José de Menezes (14 May 1685 — 10 March 1692)
- António Vasconcelos e Sousa (15 October 1692 — 14 December 1705)
- Tomás de Almeida (6 December 1706 — 22 July 1709)
- Nuno Álvares Pereira de Melo (7 May 1710 — 8 May 1733)
- Manuel Coutinho (2 January 1741 — 7 August 1742)
- Feliciano de Nossa Senhora (26 November 1742 — 15 April 1771)
- Nicolau Joaquim Torel da Cunha Manuel (17 June 1771 — 26 July 1772)
- Manuel de Vasconcellos Pereira (10 November 1772 — 29 January 1786)
- João António Binet Pincio (24 July 1786 — 19 September 1821)
- José de Jesus Maria Pinto, CRSA (24 September 1821 — 6 March 1826)
- José da Assunção Vieira, OFM (29 July 1833 — 18 November 1841)
- José de Moura Coutinho (22 January 1844 — 3 October 1861)
- Antonio da Trindade de Vasconcellos Pereira de Melo (1 October 1863 — 19 November 1895)
- Antonio Tomas da Silva Leitão e Castro (19 November 1895 — 3 December 1901)
- Francisco José Ribeiro de Vieira e Brito (8 January 1902 — 12 July 1935)
- Agostinho de Jesus e Souza (12 July 1935 — 16 May 1942)
- Ernesto Sena de Oliveira (15 June 1944 — 29 October 1948)
- João da Silva Campos Neves (29 October 1948 — 2 February 1971)
- Américo Henriques (2 February 1971 — 19 February 1972)
- António de Castro Xavier Monteiro (1 July 1972 — 5 January 1995)
- Américo do Couto Oliveira (5 January 1995 — 2 December 1998)
- Jacinto Tomás de Carvalho Botelho (20 January 2000 — 19 November 2011)
- António José da Rocha Couto, SMP (19 November 2011 — present )

== Demographics ==
Statistics
| Year | Population | | | Priests | | | | Permanent Deacons | Religious | | Parishes |
| Year | Catholics | Total | % | Diocesan | Religious | Total | Catholics per Priest | Permanent Deacons | Male | Female | Parishes |
|---|---|---|---|---|---|---|---|---|---|---|---|
| 1909 | Almost entire pop. | 273,741 | - | 314 | - | 314+ | ≈872 | - | - | - | 283 |
| 1949 | 224,398 | 224,969 | 99.7 | 215 | 9 | 224 | 1,001 | - | 11 | 58 | 217 |
| 1970 | 220,112 | 220,114 | 100.0 | 191 | 13 | 204 | 1,078 | - | 15 | 94 | 221 |
| 1980 | 230,500 | 235,600 | 97.8 | 162 | 16 | 178 | 1,294 | - | 18 | 86 | 223 |
| 1990 | 171,280 | 172,000 | 99.6 | 171 | 15 | 186 | 920 | - | 15 | 79 | 223 |
| 1999 | 147,250 | 148,547 | 99.1 | 157 | 11 | 168 | 876 | - | 12 | 82 | 223 |
| 2000 | 146,826 | 148,123 | 99.1 | 151 | 11 | 162 | 906 | - | 12 | 79 | 223 |
| 2001 | 143,470 | 144,727 | 99.1 | 141 | 10 | 151 | 950 | - | 11 | 80 | 223 |
| 2002 | 142,926 | 144,218 | 99.1 | 143 | 10 | 153 | 934 | 2 | 11 | 79 | 223 |
| 2003 | 145,378 | 147,608 | 98.5 | 146 | 11 | 157 | 925 | 2 | 12 | 76 | 223 |
| 2004 | 159,758 | 162,297 | 98.4 | 147 | 9 | 156 | 1,024 | 2 | 10 | 70 | 223 |
| 2013 | 157,500 | 160,700 | 98.0 | 127 | 6 | 133 | 1,184 | 1 | 6 | 57 | 223 |
