= Beira Baixa Province =

Beira Baixa
- Province
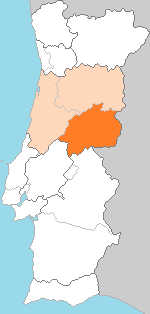
- Location of Beira Baixa in Portugal in 1936 (Dark orange). In the region of Beira (Light orange).
- Country: Portugal
- Seat: Castelo Branco

Beira Baixa (European Portuguese pronunciation: [ˈbɐjɾɐ ˈβajʃɐ]; "Lower Beira") was a Portuguese province. It was abolished with the Constitution of 1976.

It was created in 1936 from the Beira Province.

== Municipalities ==
The 13 municipalities in the province:

- Belmonte - Castelo Branco District - Cova da Beira Subregion
- Castelo Branco - Castelo Branco District - Beira Interior Sul Subregion
- Covilhã Municipality - Castelo Branco District - Cova da Beira Subregion
- Fundão Municipality - Castelo Branco District - Cova da Beira Subregion
- Idanha-a-Nova Municipality - Castelo Branco District - Beira Interior Sul Subregion
- Mação Municipality - Santarém District Pinhal Interior Sul Subregion
- Oleiros Municipality - Castelo Branco District - Pinhal Interior Sul Subregion
- Pampilhosa da Serra Municipality - Coimbra District - Pinhal Interior Norte Subregion
- Penamacor Municipality - Castelo Branco District - Beira Interior Sul Subregion
- Proença-a-Nova Municipality - Castelo Branco District - Pinhal Interior Sul Subregion
- Sertã Municipality - Castelo Branco District - Pinhal Interior Sul Subregion
- Vila de Rei Municipality - Castelo Branco District - Pinhal Interior Sul Subregion
- Vila Velha de Ródão Municipality - Castelo Branco District - Beira Interior Sul Subregion
