= Pinhal =

Pinhal may refer to:

== Brazil ==
- Pinhal, Rio Grande do Sul, a municipality
- Pinhal Grande, Rio Grande do Sul, a municipality
- Pinhal de São Bento, Paraná
- Pinhal da Serra, Rio Grande do Sul
- Balneário Pinhal, Rio Grande do Sul, a municipality
- Espírito Santo do Pinhal, São Paulo, a municipality
- Pinhal River, a river in Rio Grande do Sul

== Portugal ==
- Pinhal Novo, a parish in the municipality of Palmela
- Pinhal Litoral
- Pinhal Interior Norte
- Pinhal Interior Sul

== China ==
- El Piñal, named Pinhal in Portuguese, a former Spanish trading port

== See also ==
- Pinhalão, Paraná, Brazil
