= Monsanto (disambiguation) =

Monsanto is a former American agrochemical and agricultural biotechnology corporation acquired by German chemical company Bayer in 2018.

Monsanto may also refer to:

== Places ==
- Monsanto, Illinois, a community in the United States
- Monsanto (Idanha-a-Nova), Portuguese town and former civil parish
  - Castelo de Monsanto, a castle in the town
- Monsanto Forest Park, a park in Lisbon, Portugal
  - Circuito de Monsanto, a former race track

== People ==
- Monsanto family, a Sephardic Jewish merchant family
- Dionne Monsanto (born 1985), Filipina actress
- Gus Monsanto (born 1974), Brazilian singer
- Monsanto Pope (born 1978), American footballer

== Other uses ==
- G.D.R. Monsanto, football club
- Monsanto Canada, the Canadian division of Monsanto Company
