= Castle of Penamacor =

Medieval castle in Penamacor, Castelo Branco, Portugal

- Castelo de Penamacor
- Castelo Branco, Beira Interior Sul, Centro in Portugal
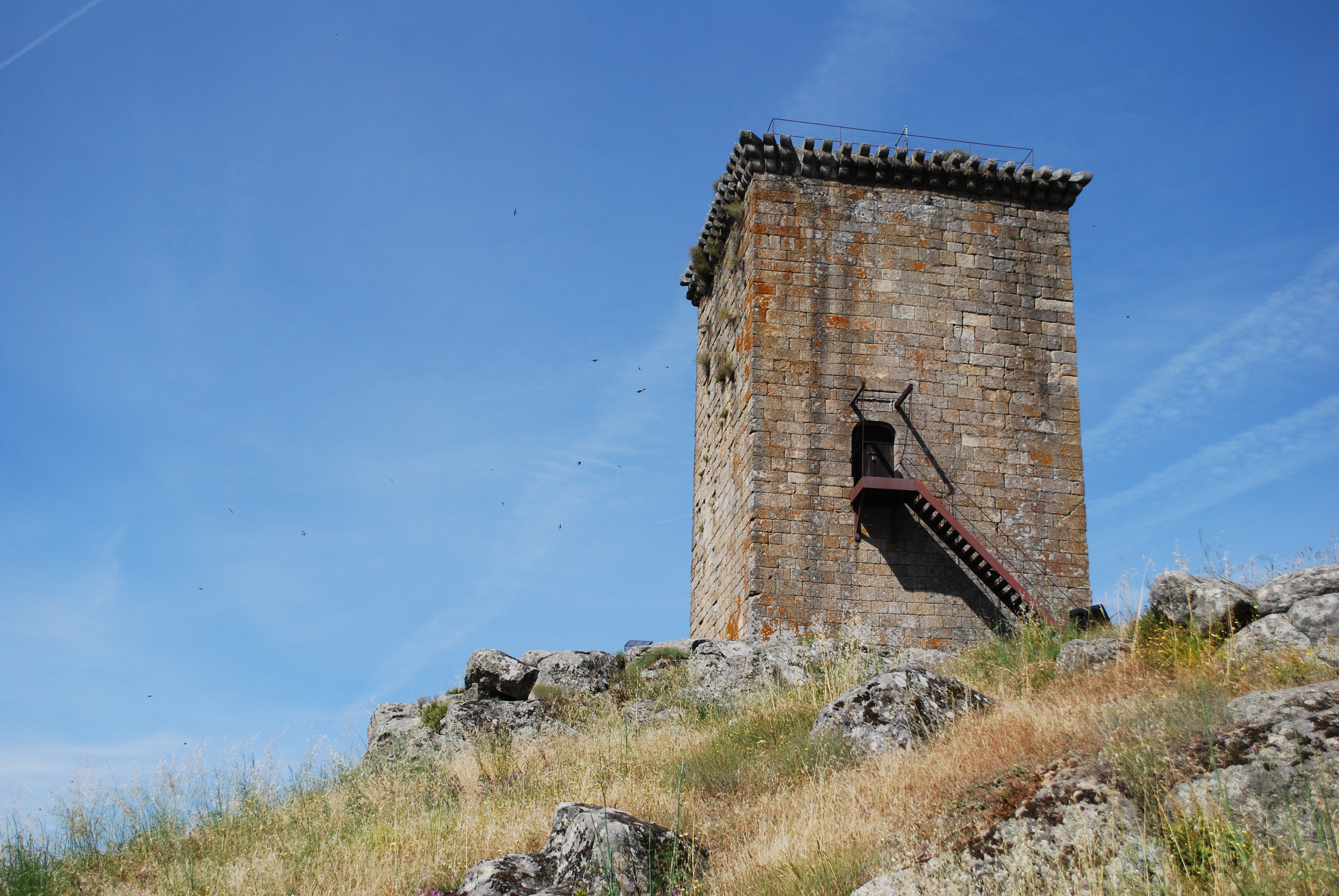
- The keep tower of the fortress and castle of Penamacor

Site information
- Type: Castle
- Owner: Portuguese Republic
- Open to the public: Private

Location
- Coordinates: 40°10′1.3″N 7°9′56.9″W

Site history
- Built: 12th century
- Materials: Granite, Masonry

The Castle of Penamacor (Portuguese: Castelo de Penamacor) is a medieval castle located in the civil parish of Penamacor, in the municipality of Penamacor, Portuguese district of Castelo Branco.

== History ==
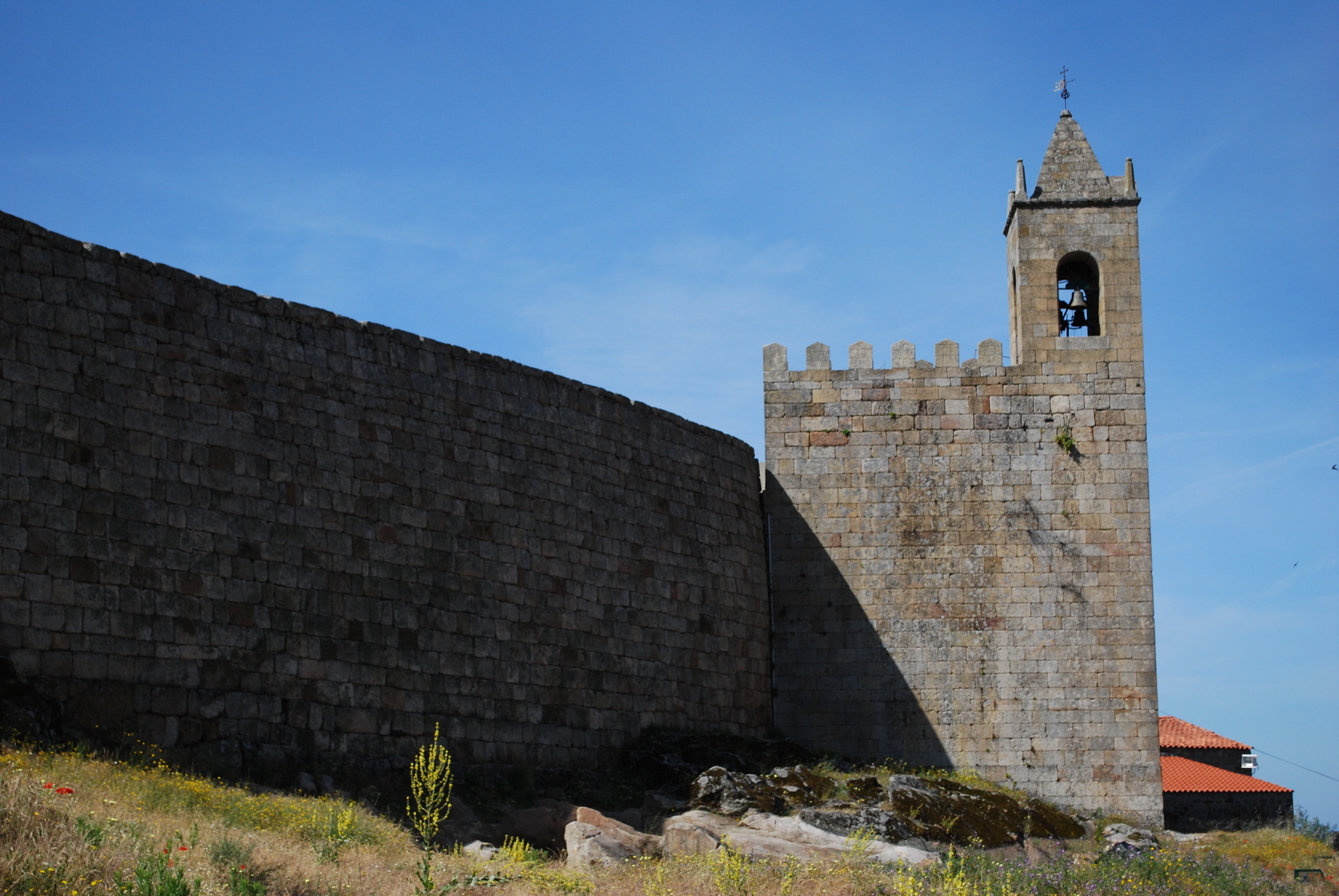
The clocktower at the entrance of the fortress

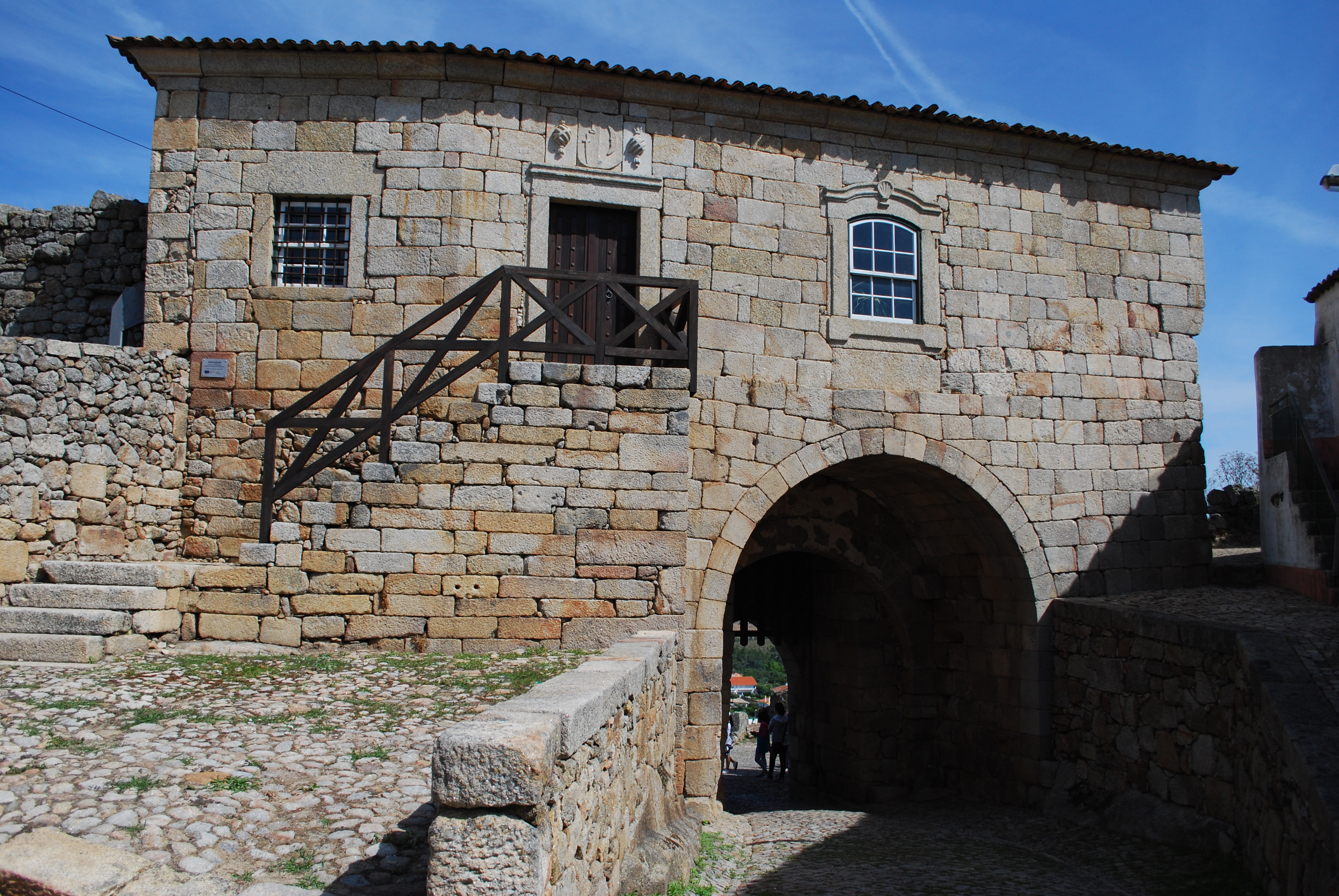
The house of the municipality within the fortress

The origins of the castle date to reign of King D. Sancho I, around 1189. At that time, the castle was settled and donated to D. Gualdim Pais, Master of the Order of the Temple (Knights Templar), resulting in the establishment of a fortification on a pre-existing castro. Its construction dates from this period (or following the donation) when the fortification's courtyard was begun, similar to other Templar donations, the site had a military significance associated with a period of colonization or defense. Contemporary excavations in the Cimo da Vila area have still not affirmatively indicated its period of occupation. It was A foral (charter) was conceded to Penamacor in 1199 by King D. Sancho I, which was ratified in 1209, following the similar model of Ávila/Évora. It was likely during this period that the castle was ordered built by D. Sancho I.

The second line walls, the keep tower and urban circus was also expanded in 1300 during the reign of King D. Denis. Little remains of the early medieval castle, and those remnants that do date to the period of the early Middle Ages, during the monarchy of King D. Dinis, when the walls and significant keep tower were constructed. Meanwhile, the barbican and other elements date from the reigns of King D. Ferdinand I and King D. John I, between the late 13th century and early 14th century.

In 1379, the couto was instituted.

In the 15th century, King D. Afonso V created the countship of Penamacor, bestowing it on D. Lopo de Albuquerque.

The 1496 Inquirição (Inquiries) refers to the existence of 389 inhabitant on the site.

The principal element was the 16th century keep tower, erroneously identified as a Torre de Vigia (lookout tower) by Landeiro (1982) and systematically characterized by other authors. Constructed in the reign of King D. Manuel, the rectangular structure included an elevated entrance over the ground with staircase. It was uniformly crowned by balcony with machicolations, a military solution which was relatively rare in Portugal, influenced by interventions in this century, and designed by local master mason João de Ortega, who added two circular corbels. Drawings by Duarte de Armas between 1509-1510, represent the walls around the settlement as an irregular polygon, that accompanied the contours of the terrain. The design also included an adarve decorated with merlons in the north, and a lower curtain of ruined exterior walls. The castle was situated on the extreme east, projected to the exterior. Opposite to this, and on the outside of the walls, is an isolated rectangular tower (the lookout tower) surmounted by merlons. Addorsed to the town wall is a U-shaped barbican that partially includes in the south, west and north, followed by protected adarves with merlons and cruciform bombardments with cylindrical corbels with slits on the northwestern and northeastern angles. Entrance to the structure came from the western wall, under an arched doorway. The Irregular castle plan included walls decorated with merlons to the keep tower in the southeast. This structure was marked by, as the author intonated "it was not finished at the time I saw it and was at a height of 14 varas and a half". The interior of the courtyard was filled with three oversized two-storey spaces, surrounded by patios (one with a cistern).

In the 1527 Numeramento (ecclesiastical survey) the population of the castle included 864 inhabitants.

In 1568, the Casa da Câmara building was accessible from the gate overlooking the town. It had two halls, one for sessions and another for scribes. In 1500, though, the civil registry office burned down.

By the middle of the 17th century, renovation of the defensive structures were undertaken during the context of the Portuguese Restoration Wars, being Military Governor of Beiras, Marquess of Castelo Melhor, who initiated work on the construction of six bastions.

Alterations to the residence occurred in the 18th century, that included repairs to the castle in 1719, by Manuel Pinto Vilalobos. But, in 1739, the keep tower was obliterated following an accident, when it was being used as a powder magazine. In addition to the keep, several of the buildings in the interior courtyard were damaged. This, as an infantry regiment was stationed on site.

The 1758 Memórias Paroquiais indicated that Penamacor was the possession of the King, and described the castle as including a southern tower, the palace of the "king" in the east, in addition to municipal hall and jailhouse, both accessible by the exterior wall with clock tower. Signed by the vicar Ascênsio de Carvalho, the Memórias indicated that the walls were built of simple, single stone, with six bastions and with two gates: the Carros in the east and the Santo António in the west. A later revision, signed by prior of the parish of Santa Maria, Manuel da Gama Reixa, the Penamacor castle was referred as having walls in ruins in two areas: right of the gate, provoked by a storm, and along the tower, following a violent fire, caused by an explosion. In addition, it referred to a triangular square and a niche in the archway of the gate, with a painting of Senhora do Pé da Cruz.

Further damage was evidenced in 1762.

By the 19th century, the castle had 5 bastions functioning and principal gate that was situated by the municipal palace/hall, named the Gate of Santo António, which followed the walls along the avenue, to the Gate of Monturo dos Negros. The walls followed the locality and garrison to the keep tower, the actual clock tower. From the tower, a curtain of walls extended to the old municipal hall and the Poço de El-Rei, situated a few metres from the lookout tower. From here, the walls extended to the Church São João, where the Gate of Carros was located, followed by the post of the fiscal guard, passing through the Cavaleira with vestiges of the redoubt. The walls then climbed along the Rua do Outeiro until the Gate of Santo António that was constituted of outer neighbourhoods.

In 1834, the military garrison was removed from the castle, thus initiating a progressive destruction of the walls, whose materials were being reused for various construction projects in the municipality. An attempt to catalogue the site was initiated in 1853, by Engineer, Captain Joaquim António Dias. But, in 1867, the Gate of Santo António was demolished and the stone acquired by the municipality for 60$000 réis. A new municipal clock tower was constructed for 100$000 réis by Cesário Correia da Silva, and using a 115$325 réis bell, by José António Linhares of Ourondo (who acquired the older bell). On 30 October 1874, Baltasar Pereira da Silva requested permission to remove stone from the bastion, resulting in the extraction of 30 carts of stone and debris. Similarly, on 17 July 1886, the stone from the Gate of Monturo dos Negros (situated alongside the Jardim da República), was resold and reused for the construction of the avenue and sidewalks of the town.

At the beginning of the 20th century, descriptions of the bastions were made by Lieutenant-Colonel Júlio Rodrigues da Silva. In 1933, the cistern (or Poço d'El Rei) was filled-in by the municipality. This was a precursor to modernization of the spaces, that included in the installation the Municipal Museum in the old municipal house in 1943, under the initiative of Mário Pires Bento, municipal secretary.

On 18 May 1973, the Junta Nacional de Educação (National Junta for Education) proposed the classification of the site as a national monument. On 8 August 1973, a dispatch from the Secretary-of-State for Instruction and Culture (Portuguese: Secretário de Estado da Instrução e Cultura) indicated their interest in supporting the reclassification of the site. Archaeological excavations began in September 2003, along the perimeter of the castle by Arqueonova, under the directions of archaeologist Silvina Silvério e André Teixeira, that continued between July and September 2006, by the same team, that resulted in the discovery of various bones, skeletons and a 15th-century dish, in addition to a false doorway. On 31 October 2012, the decision was published to classify the site as a national monument (Announcement 13641/2012, Diário da República, Série 2, 211).

== Architecture ==
The castle is situated on hilltop, at approximately 573 metres (1,880 ft) above sea level, located between the Ribeira de Ceife and the Ribeira de Taliscas, tributaries of the Pônsul River (affluent of the Tagus River) along the southern part of Cova da Beira. The castle overlooks much of the frontier of the Serra da Estrela along with the Castle of Monsanto, and includes a clock tower and municipal house, integrated into the walls of the fortress. Nearby is the Church of the Misericórdia.

The urban circus occupies an irregular, ovular track of which only a few segments of the identifiable perimeter still remain: a line without merlons between the House of the Câmara and the keep tower, and the section in the southern wall.

The Torre de Menagem (keep tower) or clock tower is addorsed to the exterior line of walls that confronts the urban circus. Its regular, rectangular plan includes embrasure, with two blind registers, and a partially-broken arch on the ground floor to the west, surmounted by a base relief image of a knight. The adarve is decorated by pentagonal merlons, integrated in the northeast by a bell/clock tower with pyramidal roof. The clock face is oriented to north. The rectangular lookout tower is three-storey's tall. The eastern facade over embrasure, that succeed the first and third registers, with the second marked by door with curved lintel, surmounted by an unintelligible inscription. The north face with high bilevel embrasure includes royal coat-of-arms, flanked by armilar spheres and framed by rectangular on the upper floor. On the western facade is a similar embrasure, on the second register and a window with straight lintel without frame on the third. The southern facade with similar embrasure, is partial addorsed over rocky outcroppings integrated into the construction, with a decorative adarve with machicolations composed of tripartite corbels.

The subsistent bastions, which are contiguous to the House of the Câmara, fall along the escarpment curtains, integrated into the canon emplacements (to the north). These are partially integrated into the clifftops, along the south face of the Convent of Santo António, where the other bastion is located. A fourth bastion, known as the Redoubt of the Cavalaria, is situated in the barracks of the Fiscal Guard (to the north), known as the Redoubt of Outeiro (located alongside the Rua do Outeiro, to the west).

The House of the Câmara is integrated into the urban circus, erected over the Gate of the Vila near the town pillory. This building is two-storey rectangular plan decorated with cornices and barrels with tiled roof. The northern facade is marked by an arched wall door surmounted by two windows decorated and framed by stone friezes. The coat-of-arms of Penamacor, armillary spheres and Portuguese shield with the date "1568". The rear facade is broken by a wall doorway with double arch and staircase to the upper areas, which includes door and rectangular window and lintel, flanked by the municipal coat-of-arms and an identical window opposite it.
