= Castle of Freixo de Numão =

Medieval castle in Portugal

- Castelo de Freixo de Numão
- Guarda, Pinhal Interior Norte, Centro in Portugal
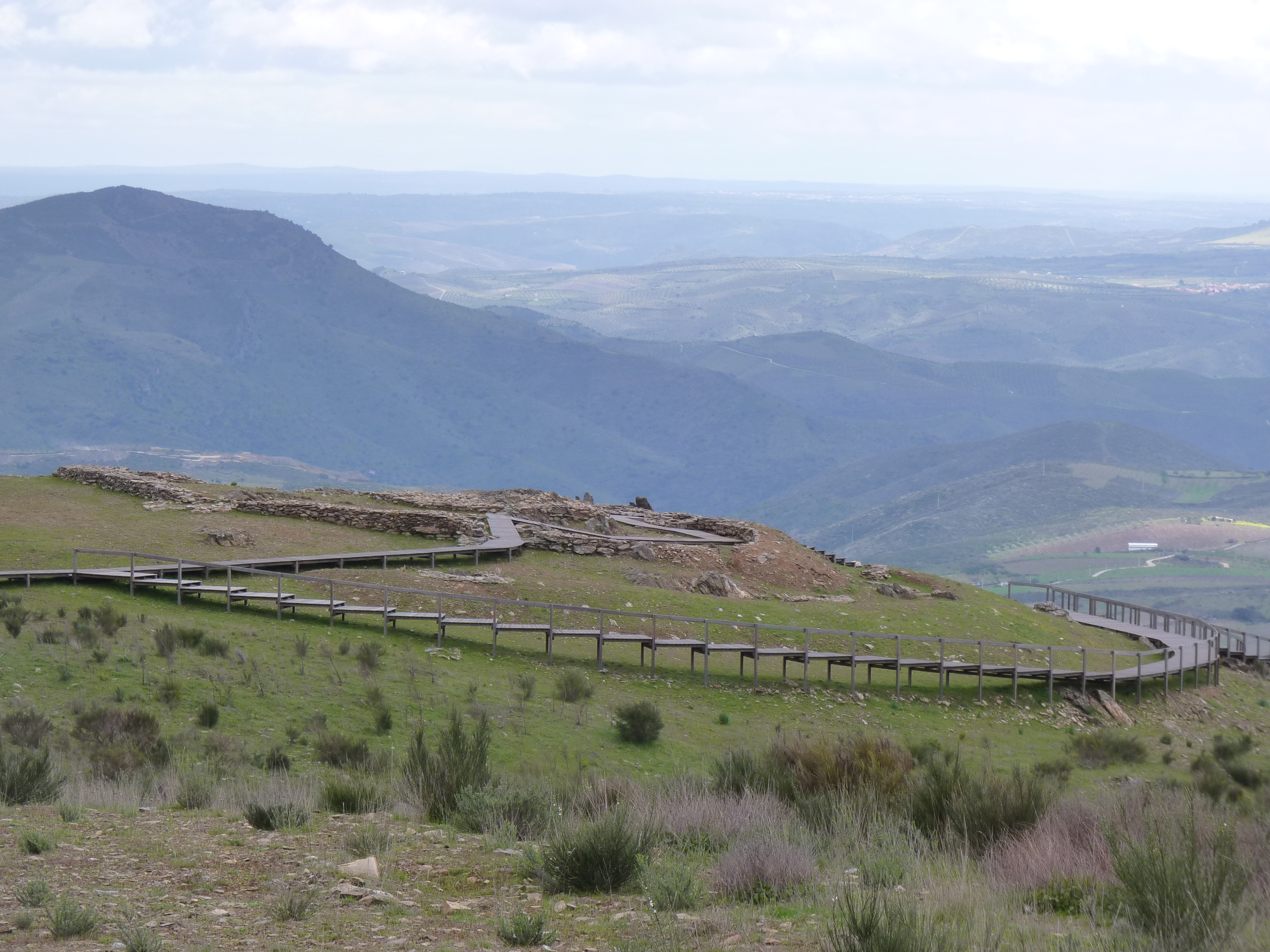
- A view of the old castle on the Monte de São Gabriel

Site information
- Type: Castle
- Owner: Portuguese Republic
- Operator: DRCNorte (Dispatch 829/2009, Diário da República, Série 2, 163, 24 August 2009)
- Open to the public: Public

Location
- Coordinates: 41.072387°N 7.191814°W

Site history
- Built: 3rd millennium B.C.

The Castle of Freixo de Numão (Portuguese: Castelo de Freixo de Numão) is a Portuguese calcolithic and bronze age walled enclosure in civil parish of Freixo de Numão, in the municipality of Vila Nova de Foz Côa, in the district of Guarda.

== History ==
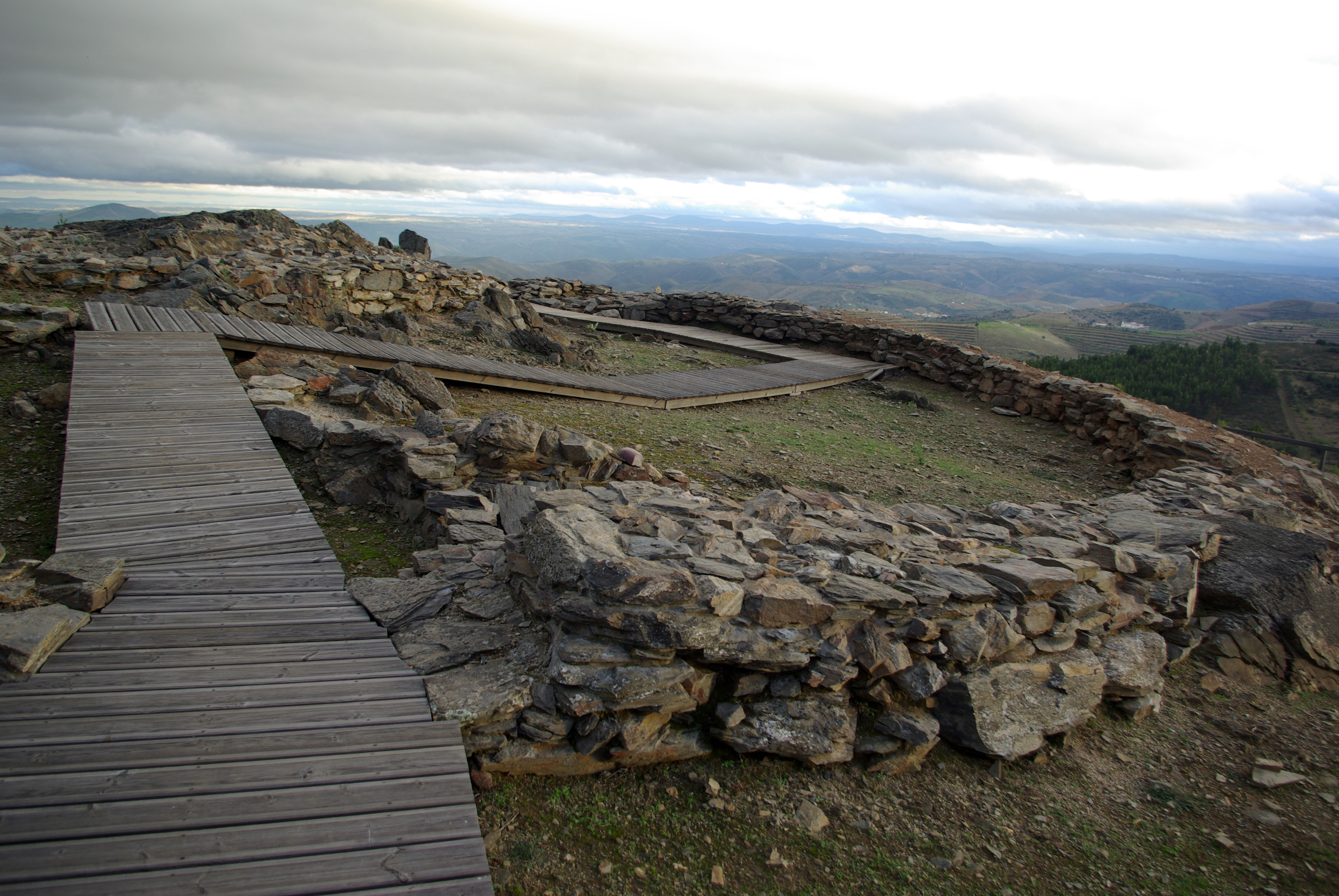
A trail along the outer wall of the castle structures

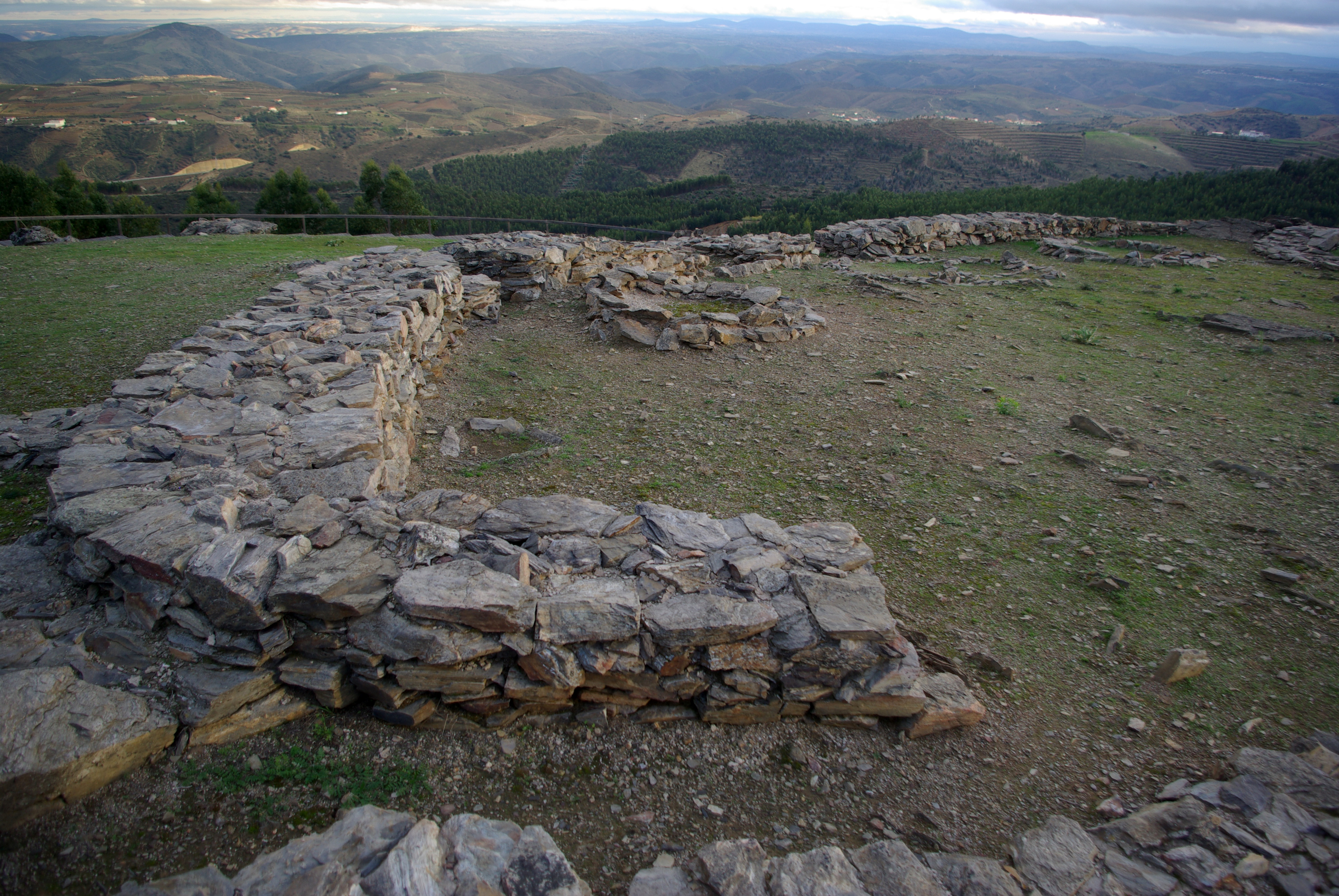
Overlooking the Viega valley from the outer wall

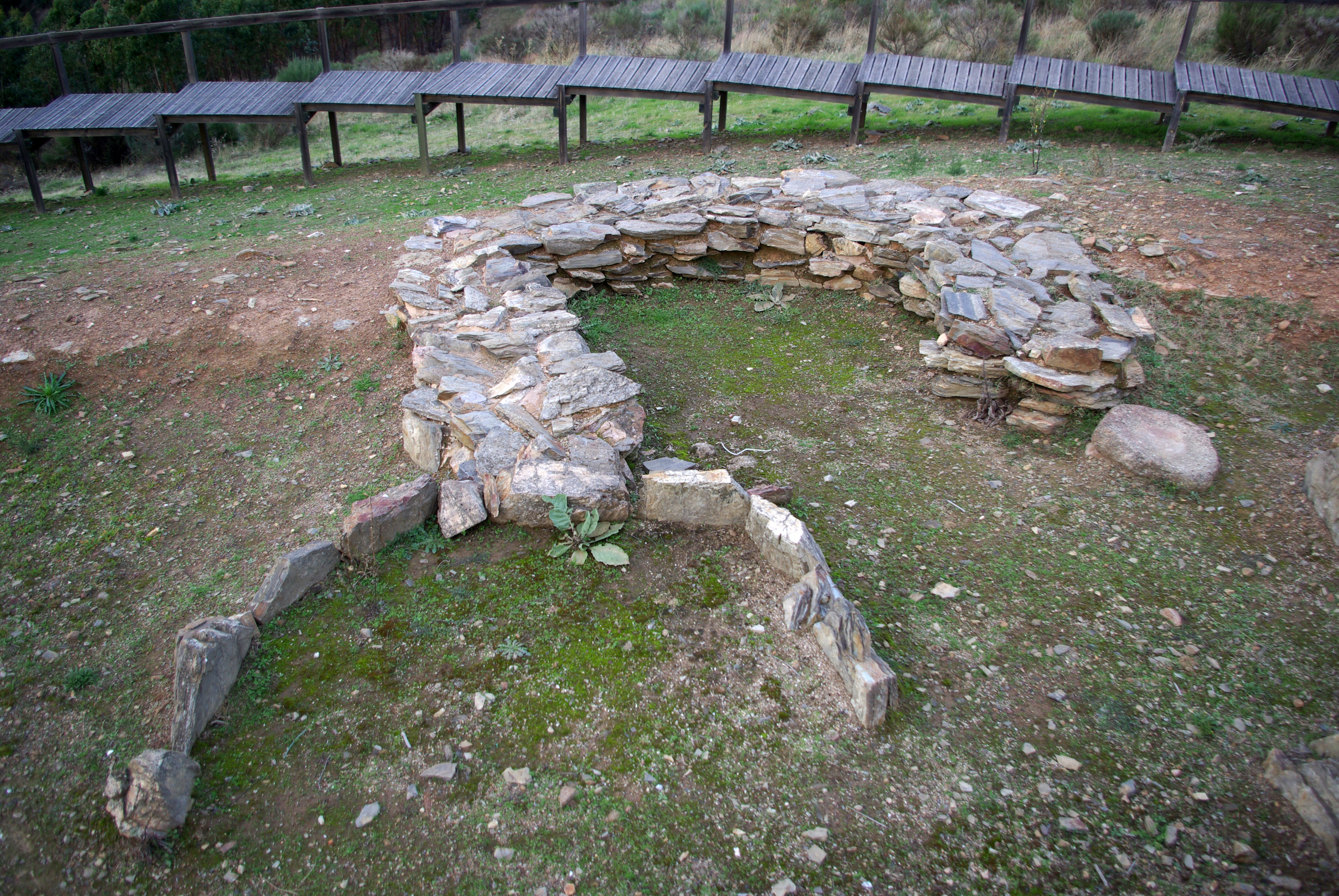
One of the individual "huts" and semi-circular structures

The first time the hilltop was occupied occurred sometime in the 3rd millennium, from the early Chalcolithic to the late Bronze Age. The oldest structures on the hill date from this period, which was followed by a stage of important construction sometime in the middle period. This period was responsible for the group of edifices and courtyards, platforms, slopes and ramps.

Sometime between 1300 and 1200 B.C., the monument was reduced to stone, either intentionally or ritualized, and left abandoned, in particular the outer zones.

In 1987, A.N. Sá Coixão planted eucalyptus in the locality, following several surveys and field studies. But, two years later, Susana Oliveira Jorge initiated excavations in the locality.

The castle was transferred to the management of the IPPAR, by CELBI (STORA) in the 1990s. This move lead to the 28 September 1998 dispatch to begin a process of classification of the site, supported by Susana Oliveira Jorge.

In 2004, further archaeological excavations and consolidation of the structures began in 2004, with construction of reception/interpretative centre built to allow visitors to visit the site. The site was open to the public in 2007. Meanwhile, on 19 March 2010, the monument reached the classification of Monumento de interesse público (MIP), following dispatch 219/2010 (published in the Diário da República, Série 2, 55). It was rectified on 15 April, under article 734/2010 (published in the Diário da República, Série 2, 73) and classified as a Sítio de interesse público (SIP).

== Architecture ==
The castle is implanted strategically on a hilltop oriented to the east, over the Veiga valley, and extends to the south, along the geological fault of Vilariça. The old castle dominates the landscape on Monte de São Gabriel and, in the background the Meseta and Serra da Marofa. In most directions, except the north and northwest, the hilltop has natural defense conditions.

At the limit is a courtyard constructed in masonry schist, consolidated mortar, with various openings and small random, semi-circular structures. In the interior, there is a circular platform consisting of various, small stone structures. Outside the enclosure are small walls and ramps in clay and shale that take advantage of rocky outcrops.
