= Castle of Monsanto =

Medieval castle in Monsanto e Idanha-a-Velha, Portugal

- Castelo de Monsanto
- Castelo Branco, Beira Interior Sul, Centro in Portugal
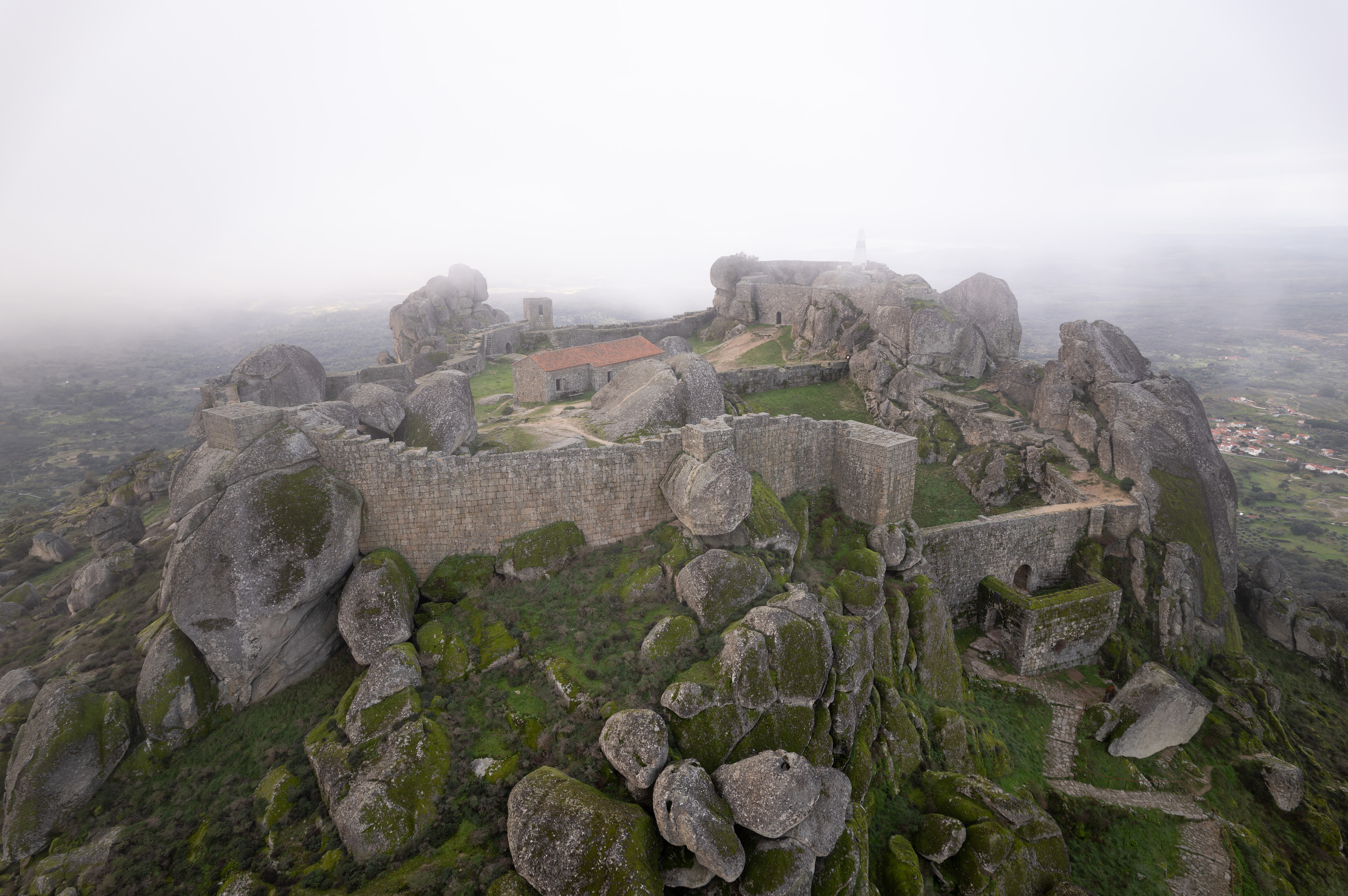
- Aerial view of the Castle of Monsanto.

Site information
- Type: Castle
- Owner: Portuguese Republic
- Operator: Junta de Freguesia de Monsanto (ceded on 10 March 1949)
- Open to the public: Private

Location
- Coordinates: 40°2′9.6″N 7°6′49.5″W

Site history
- Built: 12th century
- Materials: Granite, Masonry

The Castle of Monsanto (Portuguese: Castelo de Monsanto) is a medieval castle located in the civil parish of Monsanto e Idanha-a-Velha, in the municipality of Idanha-a-Nova, Portuguese district of Castelo Branco.

== History ==
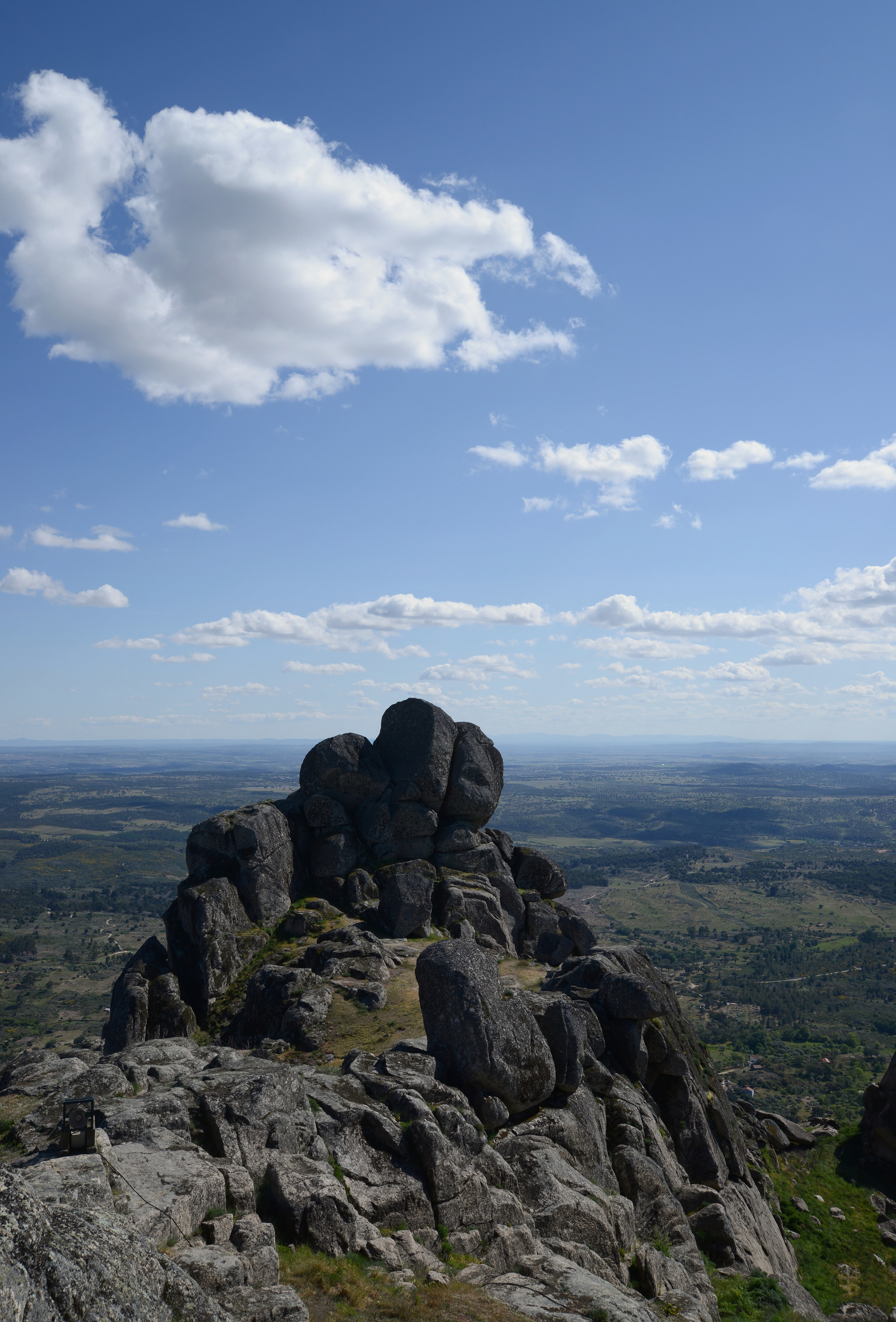
A modern view of the same view of the fortress of Monsanto

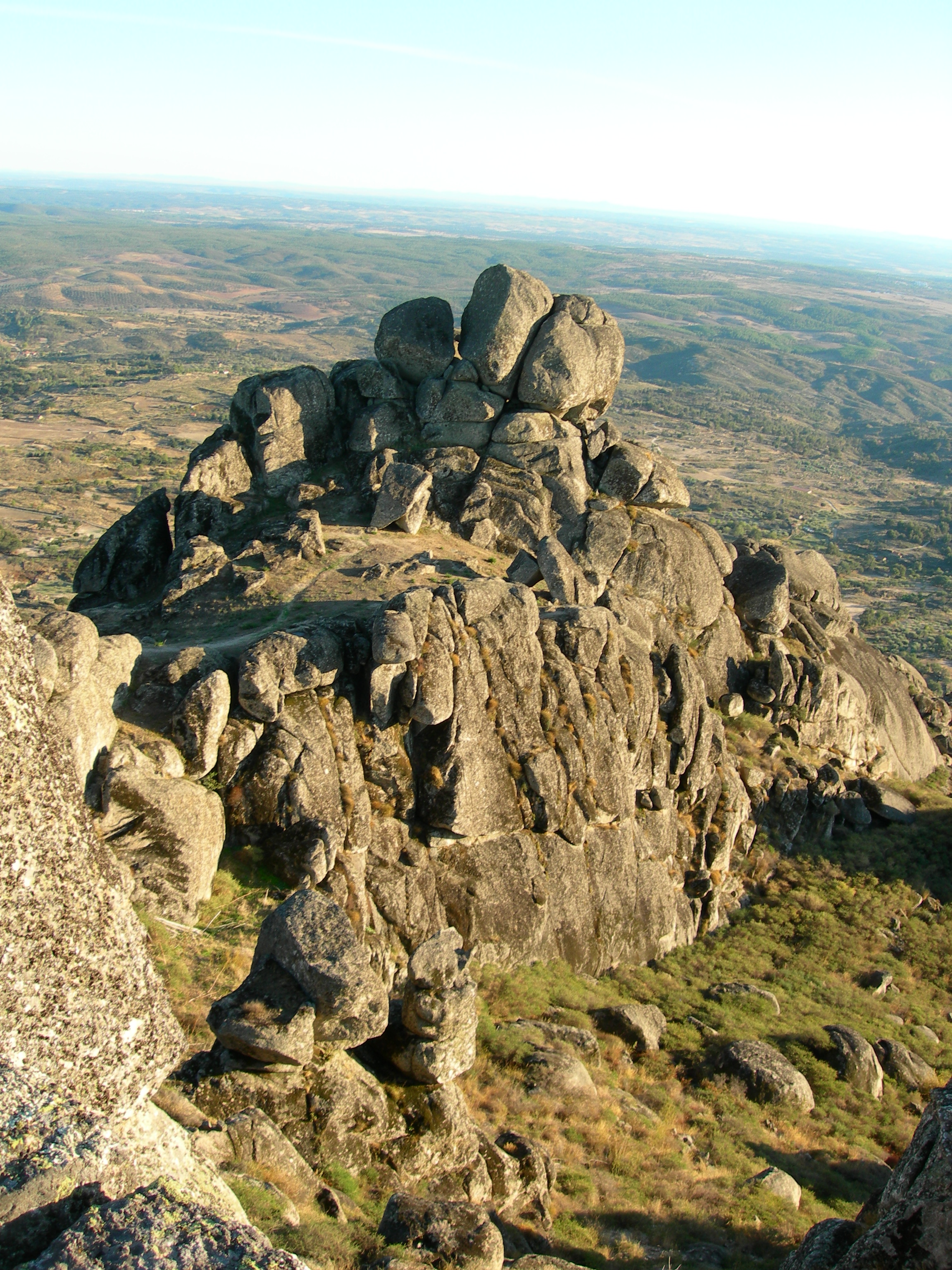
Another view above the hilltop fortress and fortifications of Monsanto

The site was likely the location of fortified settlement during prehistory. Legend suggests that during the 2nd century a castro was taken and colonized on the hilltop of Mons Sanctus, by Roman Praetor Lucius Aemilius Paullus. The castro was destroyed and progressively settled by settlers from Idanha-a-Velha.

Between the 5th and 11th century was occupied by Visigoths and Arabs.

In order to build a defensive line and strengthen his presence in the region, D. Afonso I of Portugal donated the area to D. Gualdim Pais, Master of the Templars; a vast region, that extended to the territory of Egitânea (corresponding to Idanha-a-Velha) along the Rio Erges.

"Afonso, remarkable king of the Portuguese" (Portugalensium rex)", son of Henry and Queen D. Teresa and grandson of the great and illustrious Emperor of Hispania, for us to master Galdino and all the brothers of the Knights Templar who are in my kingdom, I make a wide and giving very strong in the region of Idanha [-a-Velha] and Monsanto with the limits: Following the course of the river and between Erges my kingdom and the 'legions' to enter the [river] Tagus and the other party following the course of water [river] Zêzere River which also enters the river Tagus (...). " (Letter of Donation on 30 November 1165.)

The castles of Monsanto and Idanha-a-Velha were constructed by 1171, when a foral (charter) was donated to the settlement, following the model of Ávila/Évora. During the course of litigation with the Order of the Temple in 1172, the castle was donated to the Order of Santiago ("facio cartam donationis de castello meo proprio quad dicitur Mons Sanctus"), with the condition of not nominating an unknown commander. As a result of this change, in 1174, a new foral was issued to the inhabitants of Monsanto, by D. Afonso Henriques, which was confirmed in 1190 by D. Sancho I.

A contemporary castle was constructed during the 13th century.

It was reconstructed in the 14th century, during the reigns of King D. Dinis and D. Fernando.

But, following its alignment with the Kingdom of Castile during the 1383–1385 Portuguese interregnum, the site began to fall into disorder. According to the chronicler Fernão Lopes, Monsanto was a village that had been loyal to Queen Beatrice. But, later however, Lopes listed the town among those aligned themselves with D. John by 1384. Beginning in the 1476, the area was reconstructed during the reign of King D. John I, resulting in the construction of a barbican and protection over the well, a large 15 metres (49 ft) chamber that belonged to the Castro family (later identified as providing abundant water for the site). By 1496, the Inquirição indicated 309 inhabitants.

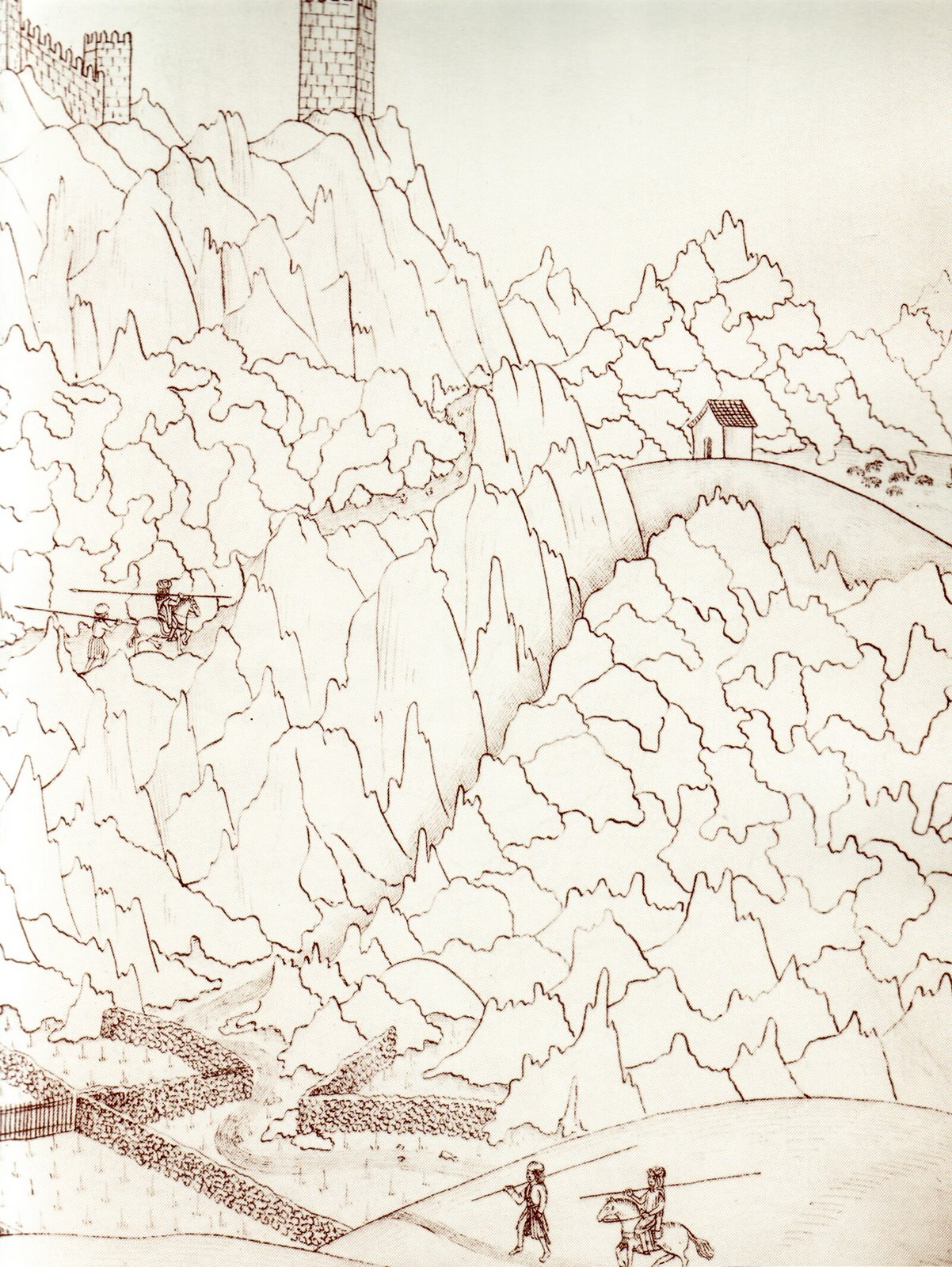
The engraving from the Book of Fortresses by Duarte d'Armas showing the castle on the clifftops

At the beginning of the 16th century, Duarte de Armas conducted a graphic survey for his Book of Fortresses, designing the castle with two access gates (the oldest opened to the cliffs) and protected by two towers. In total there were four towers, a keep and cistern. The Torre do Pião (lookout tower) was in ruins at that time. Supported by an alcaide, the urban nucleus included the parish of São Miguel and the parish of São Salvador. In the late 16th century, there was work performed during the reign of King D. Manuel I.

By 1527, during the Numeramento (medieval census) there were 494 inhabitants.

In the second half of the 17th century, the structures were adapted to support artillery, with the construction of earthenworks, batteries and canon emplacements, as well as fortification walls for the colony. This followed the 1704 siege by Franco-Spanish forces, under the command of the Duke of Berwick, but later liberated by the Marquess of Minas. By 1758, surveys of the site indicated one of the towers in ruin. Reconstruction of the fortification walls were undertaken by order of William, Count of Schaumburg-Lippe following the Spanish invasion of Portugal. Similar alterations were built in 1801, a slope was established in order to implant canons.

Major Eusébio Furtado was later responsible for the installation military garrison in 1813, resulting in major works on the castle. But, in 1815, there was an explosion of the magazine powder keg, resulting in the partial destruction of the castle. Surveys were undertaken by military engineer Maximiano José da Serra following the disaster, and military descriptions for the site were written in 1823, by Eusébio Cândido Cordeiro Pinheiro Furtado.

An 1831 collapse of a cliff resulted in the destruction of an exterior wall and a time when the Chapel of Santa Maria was in a state of ruin. Meanwhile, the Church of São Miguel continued to be open to the cult as late as 1834.

In 1853, the municipality of Monsanto was extinguished, leaving its second-order military status and militia. The 12th Infantry Regiment was stationed to the square of Monsanto in 1887.

The first work on repairing or conserving the site began in 1940, when the DGEMN Direção-Geral de Edifícios e Monumentos Nacionais (Directorate-General of Buildings and National Monuments) began restoration of the walls, detailed excavations on site and removal of topsoil. In the following two years, the work continued with consolidation of the walls and granite, construction and placement of masonry. Between 1957 and 1958, further work began that included further repairs to the walls, reconstruction of the towers and reinforcement of the ashlar stones.

In 1986, complementary work continued in the castle area that included repairing loose ashlars and consolidation of the pavement along the adarve in the west. Between 1988 and 1989, there was work on consolidating the walls and pavements, the adarve and accessways to the castle. Much of the archaeological artefacts extracted from Monsanto were dispersed throughout various museums, among which were the Museum Francisco Tavares Proença Júnior in Castelo Branco.

== Architecture ==
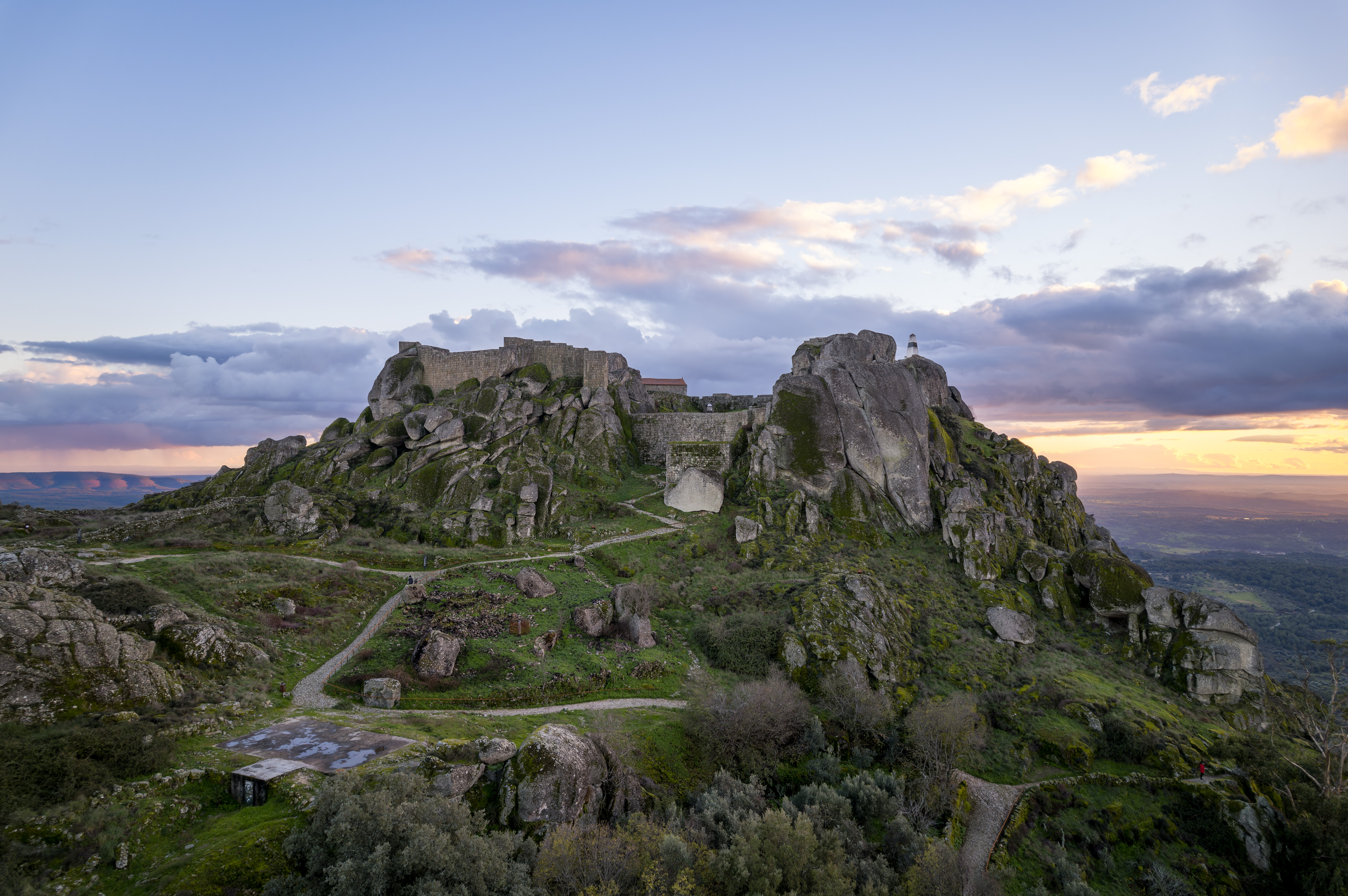
The aerial view of the accessway to the castle

The castle was located in an urban-rural location, in an area that marks the territory, on a hilltop that is 763 metres (2,503 ft) above sea level, situated on the right margin of the Rio Ponsul and overlooking the urban nucleus and parish of São Salvador. The site dominates the plains that extend to the Serra da Gardunha (in the west), Idanha and reservoir. Within its walls is the Chapel of Santa Maria do Castelo, the ruins of the Chapel of São João and Romanesque Church of São Miguel, vestiges of the old settlement, and several telecommunication towers. Surrounding this are several tombs and carved openings in the rock faces, an area characterized by granite outcroppings and abrupt cliff faces. In the east, is a lookout to the eastern frontier, with the south and southeast overlooking the valleys of Ponsol and Aravil, in addition to the Cerro da Cardoza. In the north is the Serra da Estrela (Portugal's tallest continental mountain range) and views of the Castle of Penamacor and Castle of Belmonte (Belmonte).

=== Fortress ===
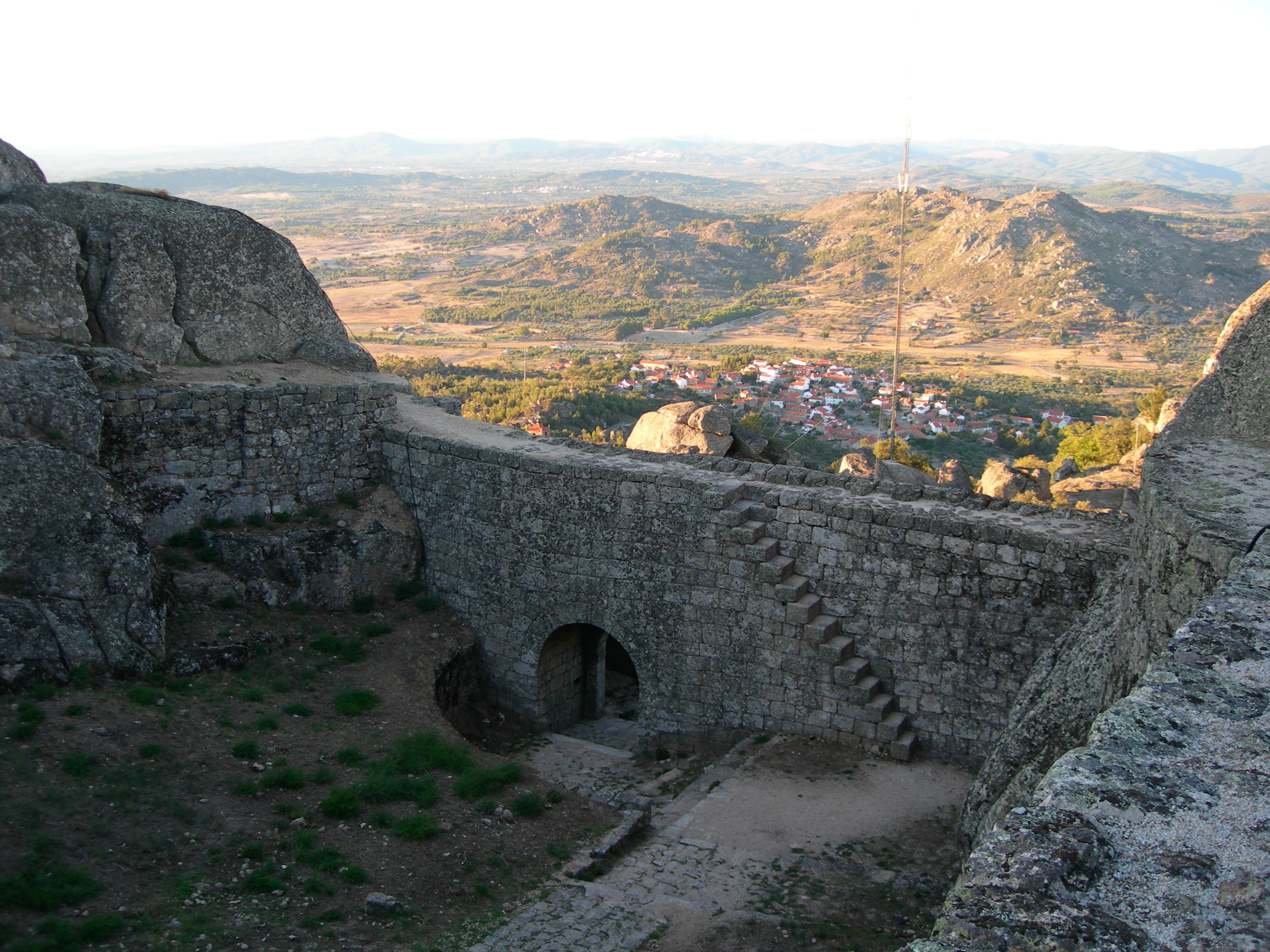
The entranceway into the courtyard from within the compound

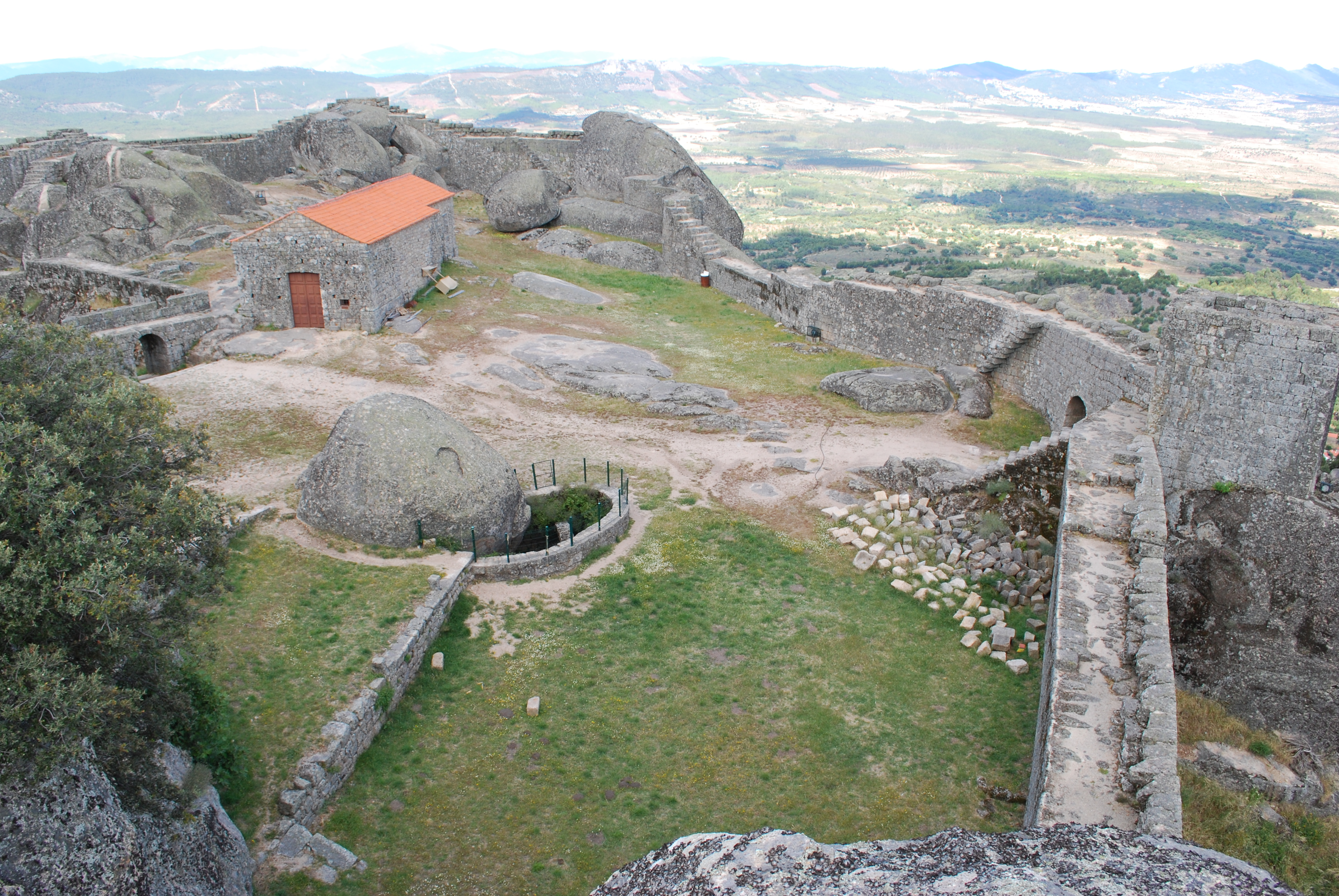
A view of the inner courtyard of castle with walls and towers

The fortress consists of three walled courtyards: an outer irregular exterior wall that encircles two other lines of walls. These segments, with staircases to access the adarve, lack merlons. The enclosure includes a main door preceded by Casa do Guarda (guardhouse), a rectangular floored compartment, with arched eastern access door. In the interior, there is an archway, surmounted by an orifice for the coat-of-arms, flanked by an armillary sphere. On the right hand side is an inscription that is indecipherable. On the northern elevation are three cross-sectional bombardments, one on the northeastern angle. The main arched gate in the north covered by vaulted ceiling and false door on the south tower.

The enclosure includes four towers attached on the outer side of the walls. Two have rectangular plans and are devoid of spans, in the north; an identical tower on the east; and a square-shaped tower on the south, with access via a flight of stairs perpendicular to the adarve, presenting a straight lintel doorway in the northern elevation. Inside the enclosure is a cistern next to a cliff, presenting two full arches and absence of cover.

The walled enclosure, adjacent to the main entrance, features a rectangular outline and a full arch door inserted in the south section, that includes battery with four canon emplacements, equipped with two ramps. Inserted into the western side is an irregular oblong segment with full arched door and protrusions that integrates a square-shaped tower on the exterior. A geodetic marker is situated over this segment. From this enclosure are rocky outcroppings with grooves and rubble corresponding to the foundations of other towers and missing wall segments.

The Torre do Pião is located outside the walls, in an elevation bordering the castle, overlooking the ruins of the Church of São Miguel. A square plan, only part of the walls corresponding to the first incomplete register are visible.

Defensive structures of São Salvador include the Gates of Santo António and Espírito Santo, the so-called bulwark or battery and wall section annexed to the Chapel of Santo António and cemetery. The Gate of Santo António, faces the west, and includes a straight lintel integrating laterally three gaps, surmounted by the royal coat-of-arms and topped by small parapet. Addorsed to the gate is a square guard tower covered in stonework, with door of straight lintel in the east. The Gate of Espírito Santo is oriented in a full arch on the outside and a straight lintel on the inner side, flanked by two gaps, with an attached guard post partially covered, with door and lintel in the west, as well as cracks in the north and east. The battery over the parking area, in Largo do Baluarte, is trapezoidal, with curtain walls over the escarpment, with door and flanked by two rectangular windows in the west.

=== Chapels ===
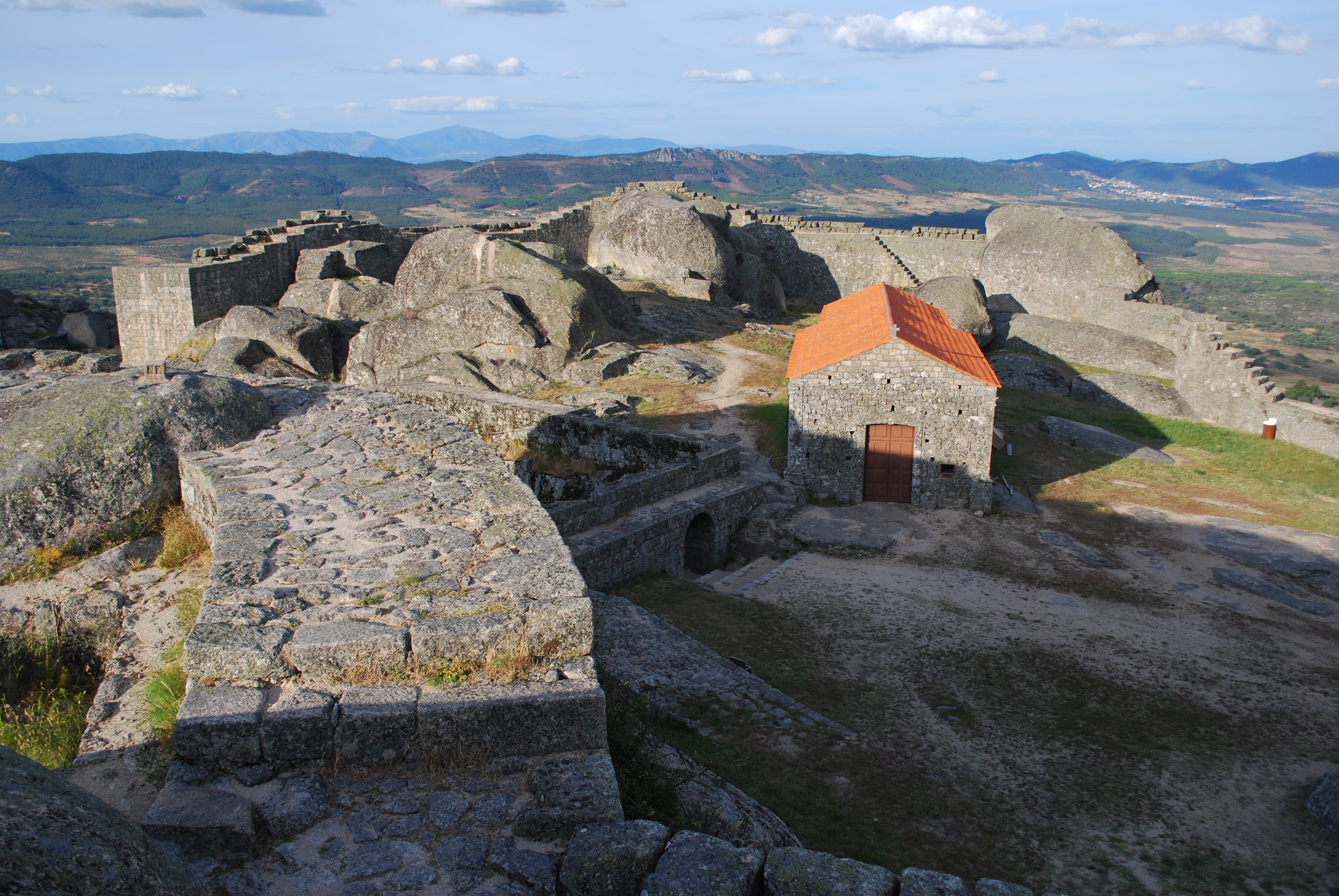
A view of the Chapel of Santa Maria do Castelo

The Chapel of Nossa Senhora do Castelo is located inside the walls, next to the battery, with longitudinal plan and comprising two juxtaposed rectangles. Its main facade (to the west) is delimited by Tuscan pilasters, torn by a hollowed arch portal with protruding stone and flanked by a small quadrangular opening and gable with cornice. The lateral elevations include doors of straight lintels, and a southern window in the body of the main chapel.

Near the chapel are three trapezoidal tombs and a group of anthropomorphic excavations in the isolated rocks. The ruins of the Chapel of São João includes a perfect arch and is isolated in the eastern flank of the castle.

=== Church ===
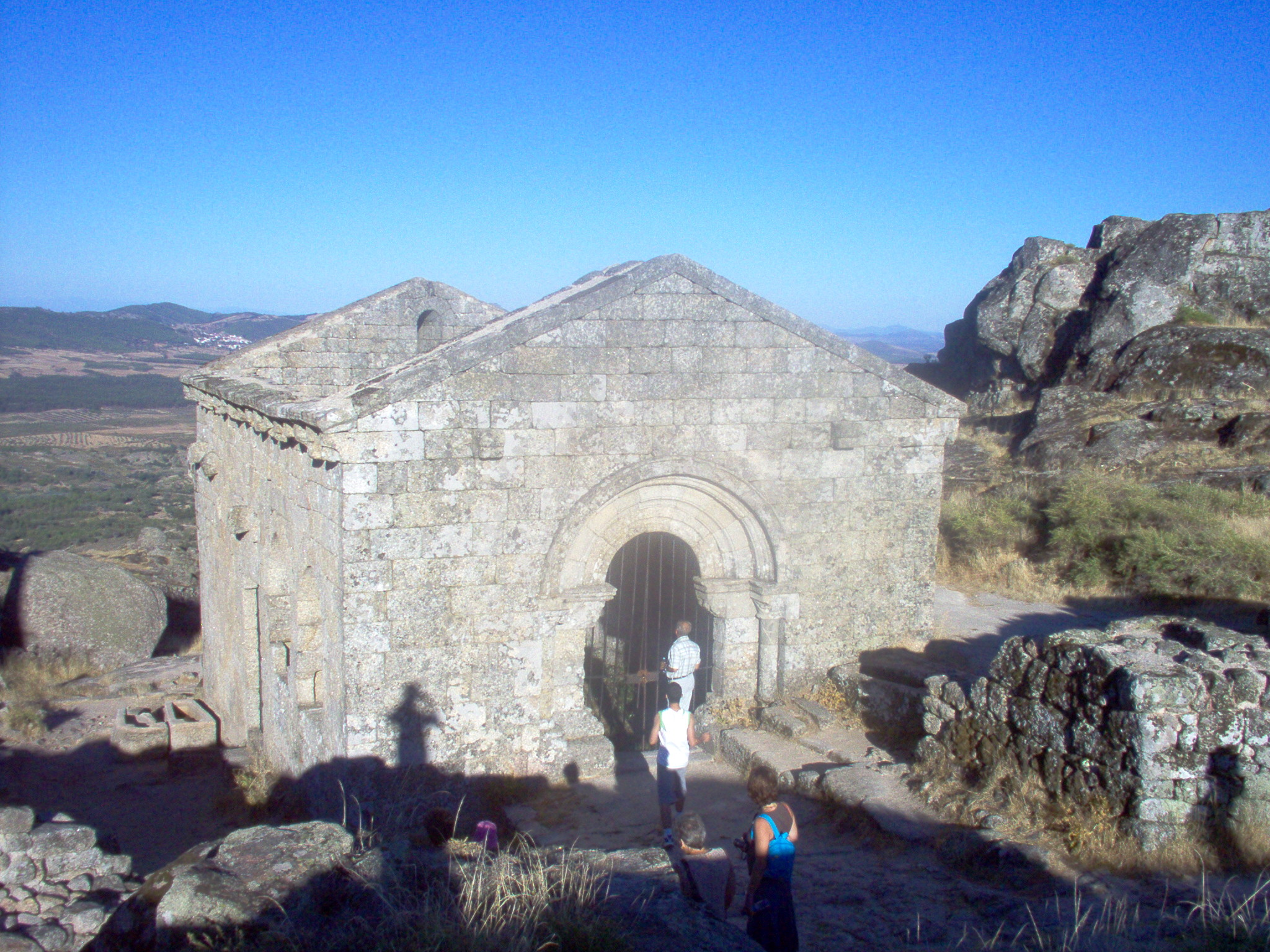
The ruins of the Church of São Miguel do Castelo

The ruins of the Church of São Miguel with longitudinal plant composed of two juxtaposed rectangles and absence of cover/ceiling. Its main facade is oriented to the west, and includes full arch door with four archivolts, imposing towers and capitals with zoomorphic decoration. The northern column displays a standard cubit measure, and it is decorated in cornices. Also in the northern facade are three arcosolia in a broken arch, two in the nave and one in the main chapel, with a full arch doorway with straight tympanum and a straight lintel. The cornice was decorated in spheres and geometric motifs. In the east there are gaps in the nave and chapel with simple cornice.

The unique nave temple is situated on a slope accessed by seven steps and conserves a rectangular altar, fragment of baptismal fountain (in the form of a chalice), columnar base and other fragments of granite. A triumphal arch are supported with posts decorated with armillary spheres. The bell tower is situated on a granite cliff, over two/twin arches.
