= Monsanto (Idanha-a-Nova) =

Village in Portugal

Coordinates: 40.039°N 7.114°W

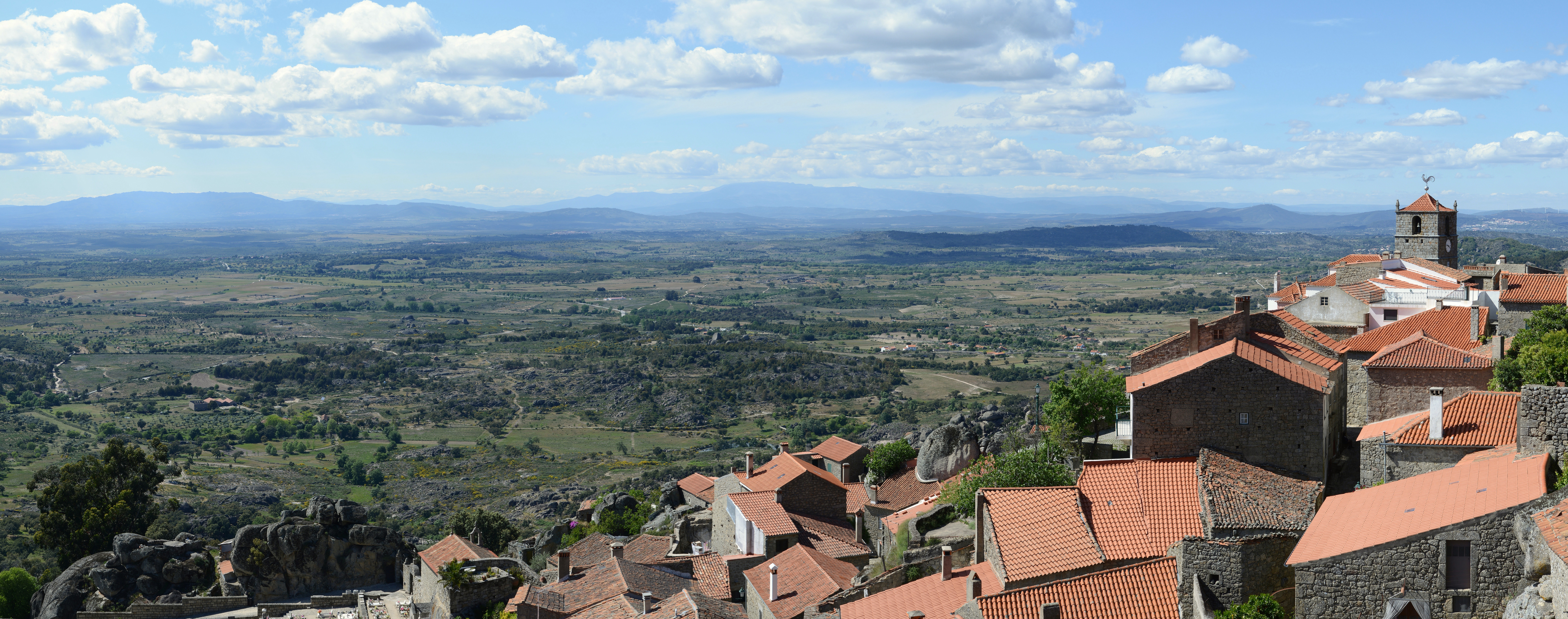
Monsanto and its granite houses.

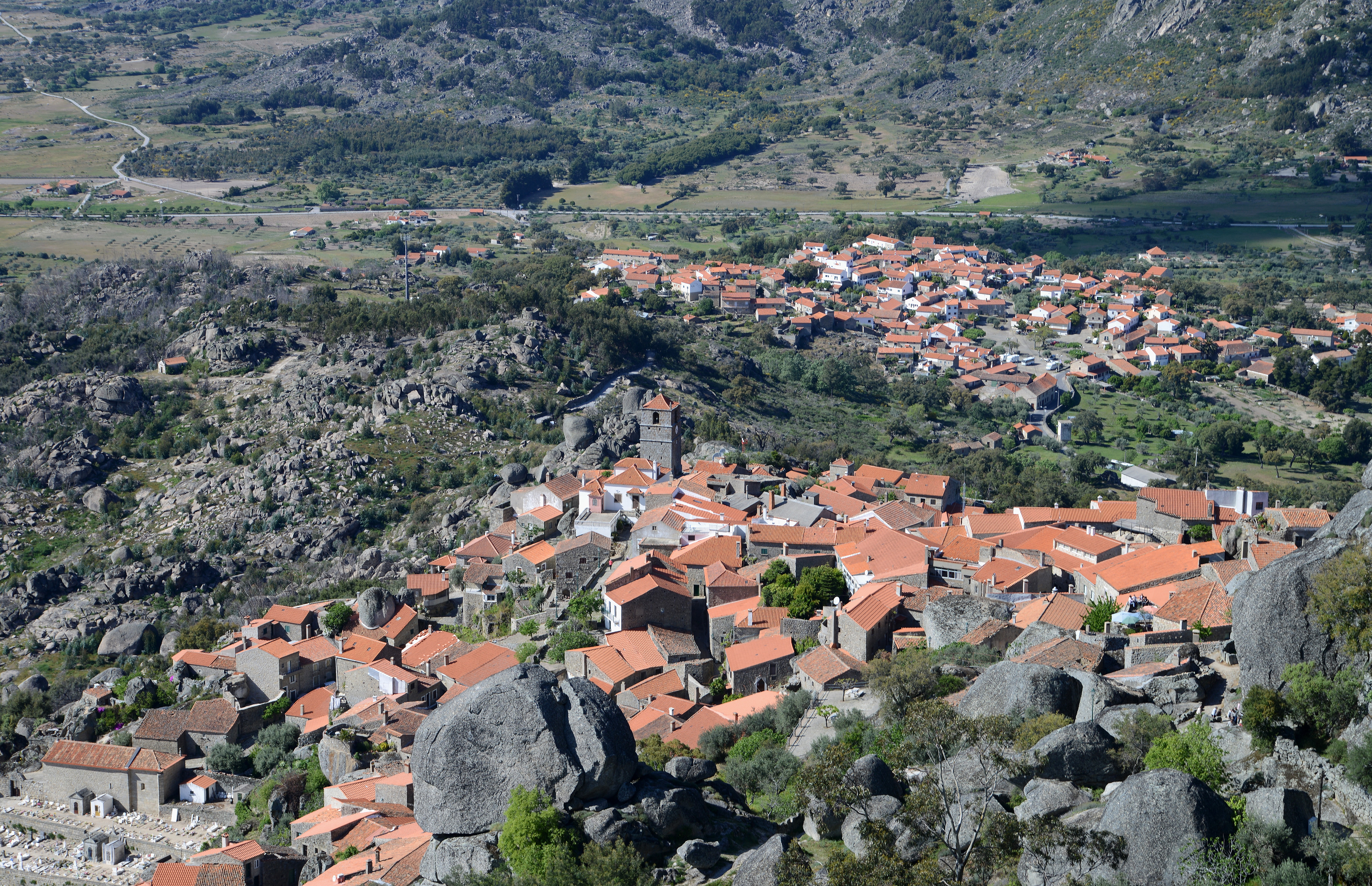
View of Monsanto from the castle.

Monsanto is a village in the civil parish of Monsanto e Idanha-a-Velha, in the municipality of Idanha-a-Nova, District of Castelo Branco, Portugal. In 2011, it covered an area of 131.76 km^{2} and had 828 inhabitants (June 30, 2011). Monsanto would become popularly known as "the most Portuguese village of Portugal" due to a government-sponsored competition that awarded twelve historic villages the distinction of Most Portuguese Village of their own province in 1938.

== History ==
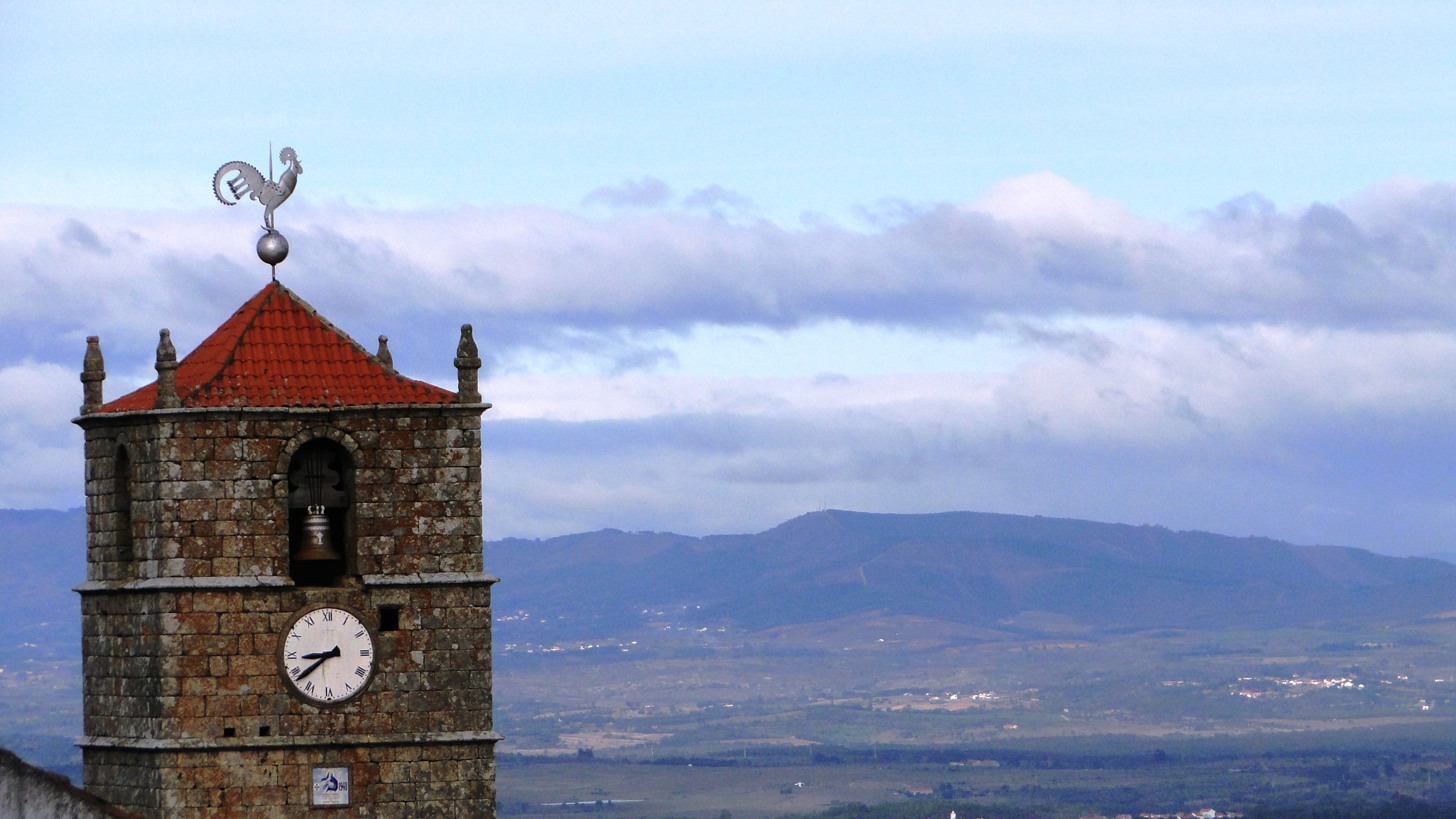
The Clock Tower or Lucano Tower with its Silver Rooster which was the trophy for winning the title of Portugal's Most Portuguese Village in 1938.

It was the main town of the concelho between 1174 and the beginning of the 19th century, and the county seat in the period of 1758-1853. The mountain Monsanto (Latin: Mons Sanctus) rises abruptly to the East of the Idanha-a-Nova up to 758 meters above sea level. The earliest traces of human activity are from the Early Stone Age, dating back to the ice ages. Later, Romans settled at the base of the mountain. Traces from Visigothic in the early Middle Ages and even earlier Arab presence have been found in the area. In the 12th century, King Afonso I of Portugal conquered Monsanto from the Moors as part of the Christian Reconquista. In 1165, he granted the custody of the city to a knights' order of the church, first to the Order of the Knights Templar, and later to the Order of Santiago. The city was given to the military orders to maintain the reconquered city within Christian hands. The Grand Master of the Order of the Knights Templar, Gualdim Pais, was manager of the building of the fortress. Later, King Sancho I of Portugal reconstructed and repopulated it after the wars with the Leonese. Unfortunately, the medieval castle was destroyed in the nineteenth century because of an explosion in the ammunition depot of the castle. Monsanto would become popularly known as "the most Portuguese village of Portugal" due to a government-sponsored competition that awarded Monsanto this distinction in 1938. The title was awarded by the Portuguese Secretariat for Propaganda under the Estado Novo regime. A symbol of Portugal, the Silver Rooster (Galo de Prata), designed by Abel Pereira da Silva, was the coveted trophy in this competition and can be seen atop the Clock Tower or Lucano Tower of Monsanto. In 2013, the parish evolved into the new parish Monsanto e Idanha-a-Velha.

== Geography ==
In 2011, it covered an area of 131.76 km^{2} and had 828 inhabitants (June 30, 2011). The mountain rock is granite upon which the historic and present villages are built in a fusion of nature and its landforms. This fusion can be seen in the uses of caves and rocks being converted into construction parts.

== Places ==
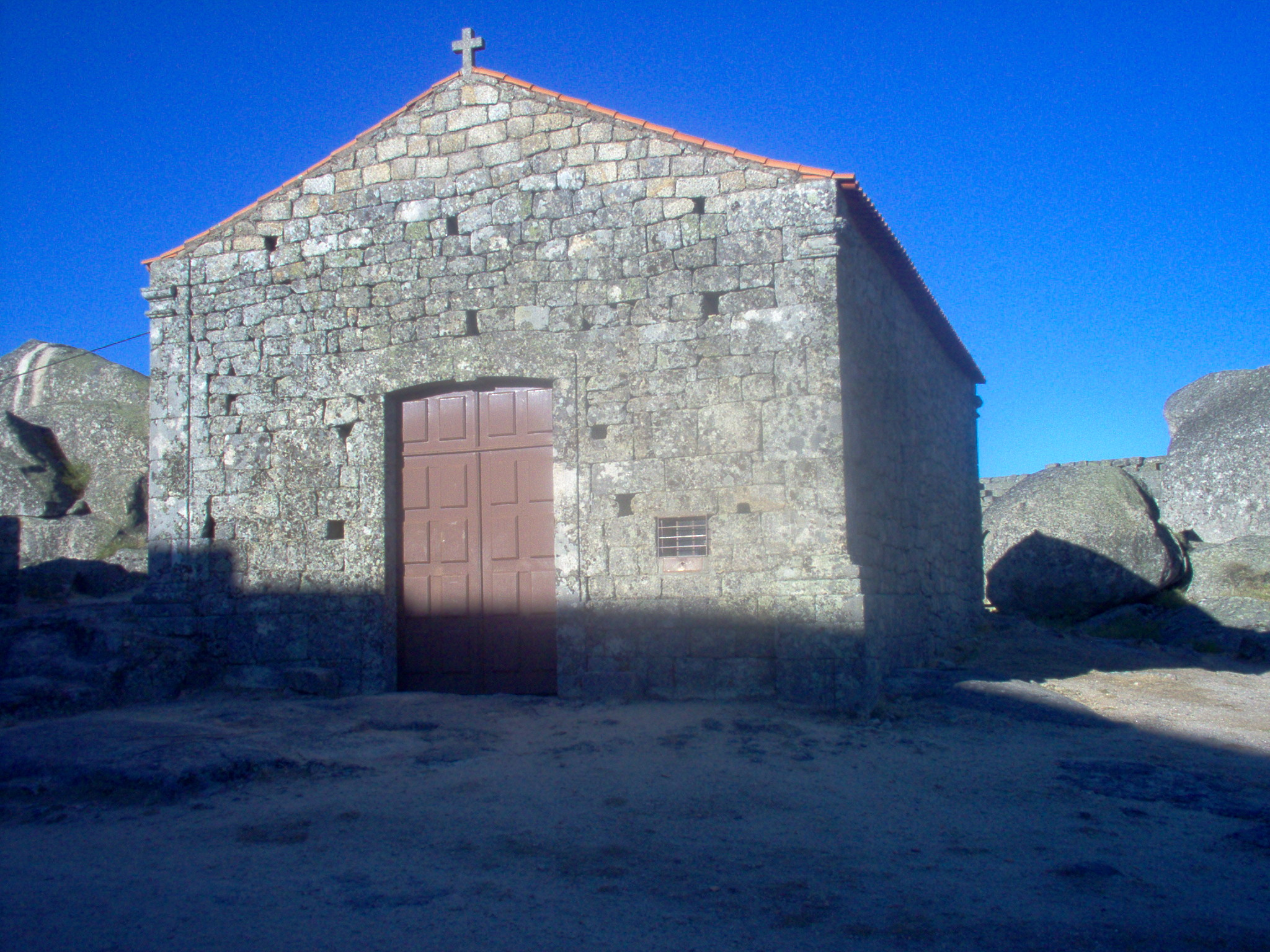
Chapel of Saint Mary of the Castle

- Castle of Monsanto
- Chapel of Saint Peter de Vir à Corça o Chapel of Saint Peter de Vira-Corça
- Roman archaeological site of Saint Lawrence
- Old village of Monsanto
- Pillory of Monsanto
- Tower of Lucano
- Chapel of Our Lady of Azenha
- Chapel of Our Lady of the Foot of the Cross
- Chapel of Saint Mary of the Castle
- Chapel of Saint Anthony
- Chapel of Saint Joseph
- Chapel of Saint Michael of the Castle
- Chapel of Saint Sebastian
- Chapel of the Holy Spirit
- Ferreiro Fountain
- Church of Mercy of Monsanto
- Parish Church of Monsanto or Church of the Saint Savior
- Solar of the Marquis of Graciosa Family (Posto de Turismo do Monsanto)
- Solar of Melo Family or Solar of the Counts of Monsanto
- Solar of Pinheiro Family or Solar of the Mono Fountain
- Solar of the Priors of Monsanto
