= Monsanto e Idanha-a-Velha =

- Civil parish
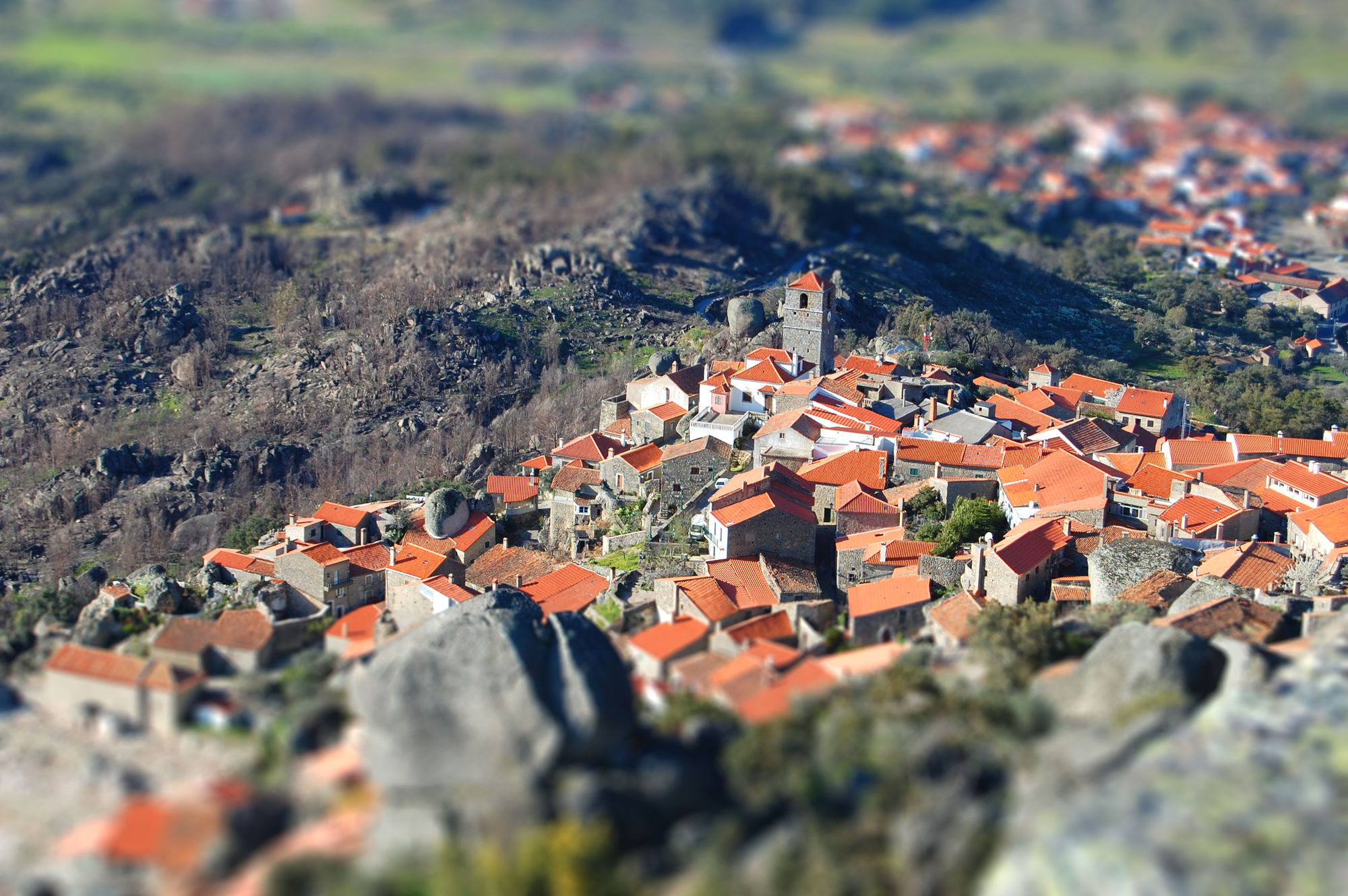
- Monsanto Village

- Location in Portugal
- Coordinates: 40.039°N 7.114°W
- Country: Portugal
- Region: Centro
- Intermunic. comm.: Beira Baixa
- District: Castelo Branco
- Municipality: Idanha-a-Nova

Area
  - Total: 152.73 km^{2} (58.97 sq mi)

Population (2011)
  - Total: 892
  - Density: 5.84/km^{2} (15.1/sq mi)
- Time zone: UTC+00:00 (WET)
  - Summer (DST): UTC+01:00 (WEST)

Monsanto e Idanha-a-Velha is a civil parish in the Idanha-a-Nova Municipality, Portugal. It was formed in 2013 by the merger of the former parishes Monsanto and Idanha-a-Velha.

The population in 2011 was 892, in an area of 152.73 km^{2}.

The village of Idanha-a-Velha keeps ancient Roman archaeological sites of the capital of Civitas Igaeditanorum (1st century BC) – later the episcopal seat during occupation by the Suebi and Visigoths. It was occupied by Muslims in the 8th century and taken back by Christians in the 12th century. It was donated to the Knights Templar in the 13th century and still has traces of different ages that attest to permanent occupation by various civilisations.

Perched on a hilltop, that oversees all the surrounding horizons, the village of Monsanto has earned it two titles in the 20th century – the Most Portuguese Village in Portugal in 1938, a title awarded by the Portuguese Secretariat for Propaganda under the Estado Novo regime, and Historical Village in 1995. Monsanto is one of the region's main tourist attractions and offers visitors a unique experience. The oldest part is also the highest point, where the Knights Templar built a wall with the donjon.

It was granted charters by King D. Afonso Henriques, King Sancho I, King Sancho II and King Manuel.

== See also ==
- Idanha-a-Velha
- Monsanto, Portugal
