= Pinhal de São Bento =

Coordinates: 26.03°S 53.4828°W

- Municipality
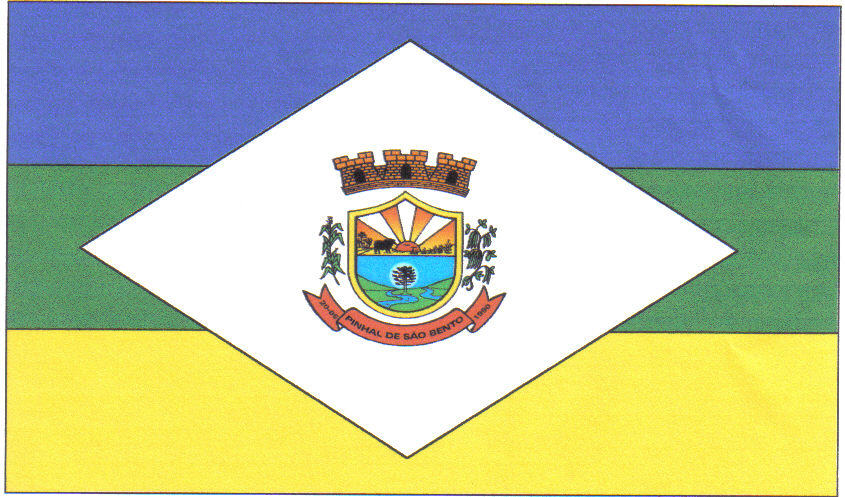
- Flag
- Interactive map of Pinhal de São Bento
- Country: Brazil
- Region: Southern
- State: Paraná
- Mesoregion: Sudoeste Paranaense

Population (2020)
  - Total: 2,737
- Time zone: UTC−3 (BRT)

Pinhal de São Bento is a municipality in the state of Paraná in the Southern Region of Brazil.

== See also ==
- List of municipalities in Paraná
