= Beira Interior Sul =

Coordinates: 39°49′08″N 7°29′59″W

Map showing the location of the Beira Interior Sul subregion

Beira Interior Sul (European Portuguese pronunciation: [ˈbɐjɾɐ ĩtɨɾiˈoɾ ˈsul]) is a former NUTS3 subregion of Portugal integrating the NUTS2 Centro Region. It was abolished at the January 2015 NUTS 3 revision. It was bordered to the east and south by Spain, to the north by the Cova da Beira and Beira Interior Norte subregions and to the west by the Pinhal Interior Sul subregion. It was created around the city of Castelo Branco (pop. 32,000).

The main economic activity is agriculture and some related light industry. In its borders lies the International Tagus Natural Park that is one of the least densely populated areas in Portugal.

The subregion covers an area of 3,738 km^{2} for a population of 75,925 inhabitants and an overall density of 20,3 inhabitants/km^{2} (the third least densely populated Portuguese NUTS3 subregions)

== Municipalities ==
Its four municipalities are:

- Castelo Branco
- Idanha-a-Nova
- Penamacor
- Vila Velha de Ródão
