= Pinhal Interior Sul =

Coordinates: 39°48′N 8°06′W

Pinhal Interior Sul (Portuguese pronunciation: [piˈɲal ĩtɨɾiˈoɾ ˈsul]) is a former subregion in the Centro region of Portugal. It was abolished at the January 2015 NUTS 3 revision. Its main town was Sertã.

== Municipalities ==
Municipality	Population (2011)	Area (km^{2})	Intermunicipal community
Oleiros	5,721	471.09	Beira Baixa
Proença-a-Nova	8,314	395.40	Beira Baixa
Mação	7,338	399.98	Médio Tejo
Sertã	15,880	446.73	Médio Tejo
Vila de Rei	3,452	191.55	Médio Tejo
