= Pinhal Interior Norte =

Coordinates: 40°7′N 8°15′W

Pinhal Interior Norte (Portuguese pronunciation: [piˈɲal ĩtɨɾiˈoɾ ˈnɔɾtɨ]) is a former Portuguese subregion, in Centro Region, Portugal. It was abolished at the January 2015 NUTS 3 revision. The principal and most populous town is Lousã. The only city is Oliveira do Hospital.

Pinhal Interior Norte

== Municipalities ==
- Alvaiázere
- Ansião
- Arganil
- Castanheira de Pêra
- Figueiró dos Vinhos
- Góis
- Lousã
- Miranda do Corvo
- Oliveira do Hospital
- Pampilhosa da Serra
- Pedrógão Grande
- Penela
- Tábua
- Vila Nova de Poiares
