= List of cathedrals in Portugal =

This is the list of cathedrals in Portugal sorted by denomination.

== Catholic ==
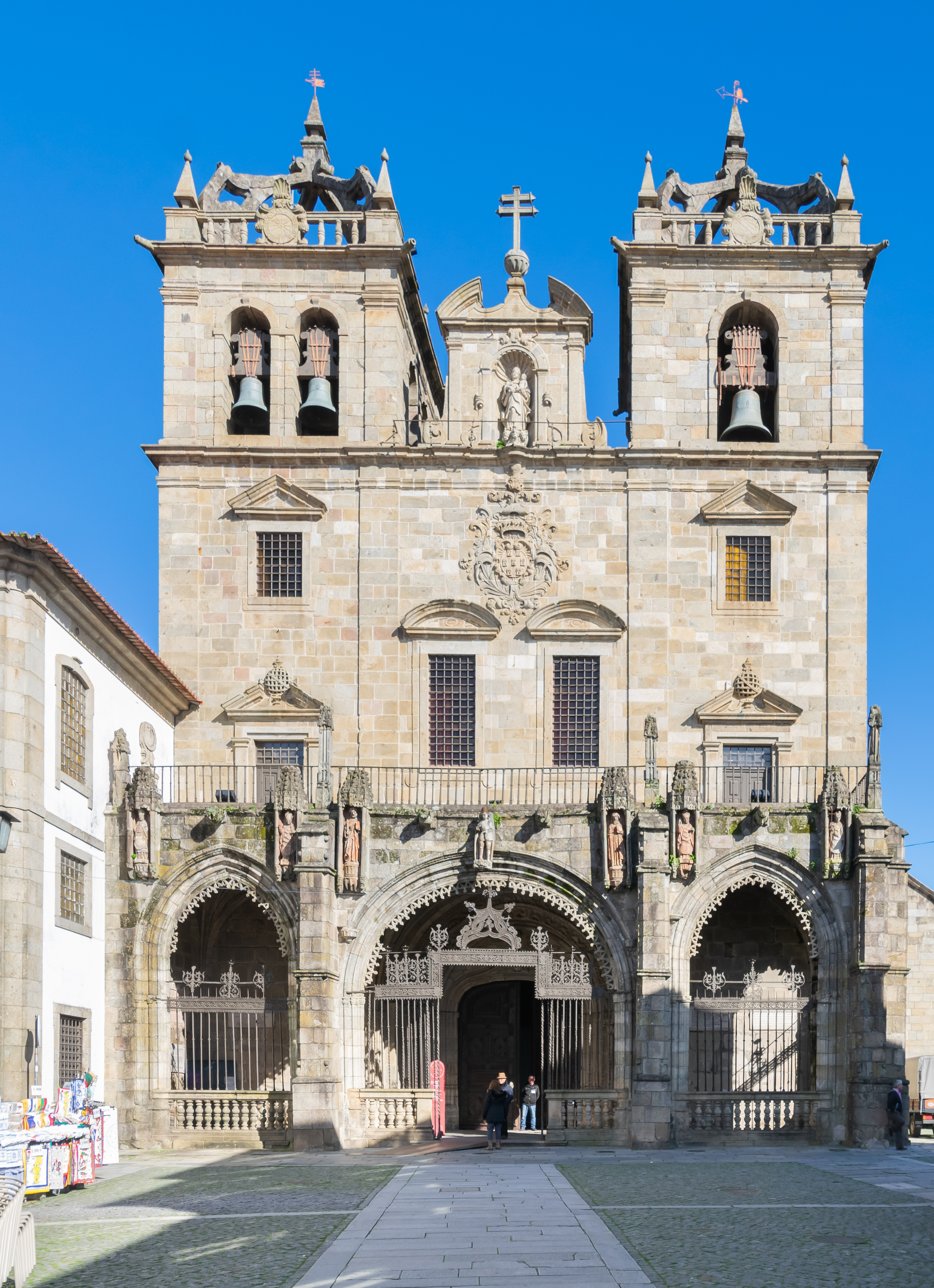
The Cathedral of St. Mary in the municipality of Braga

The New Cathedral of Coimbra in the university town of Coimbra

Cathedrals of the Catholic Church in Portugal:

- Angra do Heroismo Cathedral/Church of the Blessed Saviour (Portuguese: Sé de Angra do Heroísmo/Catedral do Santíssimo Salvador)
- Aveiro Cathedral/Church of Saint Dominic or Church of Our Lady of Mercy(Portuguese: Sé de Aveiro/Catedral de Aveiro/Igreja de São Domingos ou de Nossa Senhora da Misericórdia)
- Beja Cathedral/Church of Saint James the Great (Portuguese: Sé de Beja/Catedral de Beja)
- Braga Cathedral/Cathedral of Saint Mary (Portuguese: Sé de Braga/Cathedral de Santa Maria)
- Bragança Cathedral/ Church of Our Lady Queen (Portuguese: Igreja Catedral de Nossa Senhora Rainha)
  - Co-Cathedral of Miranda do Douro/Church of Saint Mary the Great (Portuguese: Sé de Miranda/Igreja Matriz de Miranda/Igreja de Santa Maria Maior)
- Coimbra New Cathedral/Church of the Society of Jesus (Portuguese: Igreja do Colégio de Jesus/Igreja das Onze Mil Virgens/Sé Nova de Coimbra/Museu de História Natural)
- Évora Cathedral/Cathedral of Our Lady of the Assumption (Portuguese: Sé de Évora)
- Faro Cathedral/Church of Saint Mary (Portuguese: Sé de Faro/Catedral de Faro/Igreja de Santa Maria)
- Funchal Cathedral/Church of Our Lady of the Assumption (Portuguese: Sé de Faro/Catedral de Faro/Igreja de Santa Maria)
- Guarda Cathedral/Cathedral of Our Lady of Consolation (Portuguese: Sé da Guarda)
- Lamego Cathedral/Cathedral of Our Lady of the Assumption (Portuguese: Sé de Lamego)
- Leiria Cathedral/Cathedral of Our Lady of the Immaculate Conception (Portuguese: Sé de Leira/Catedral de Leiria)
- Lisbon Cathedral/Patriarchal Cathedral of Saint Mary the Great (Portuguese: Sé de Lisboa/Igreja de Santa Maria Maior)
- Portalegre Cathedral/ Cathedral of Our Lady of the Assumption (Portuguese: Sé de Portalegre/Catedral de Portalegre)
  - Castelo Branco Co-Cathedral/Church of Saint Michael (Portuguese: Sé de Castelo Branco/Igreja de São Miguel)
- Porto Cathedral/Cathedral of the Assumption of Our Lady (Portuguese: Sé de Porto)
- Santarém Cathedral/College of Our Lady of the Assumption/Seminary of Santarém (Portuguese: Colégio de Nossa Senhora da Conceição/Seminário de Santarém/Sé de Santarém/Vestígios do Antigo Paço Real)
- Setúbal Cathedral/Church of Saint Mary of Grace (Portuguese: Sé de Setúbal/Igreja de Santa Maria da Graça)
- Cathedral of Viana do Castelo (Portuguese: Sé de Viana do Castelo/Igreja Matriz de Viana do Castelo)
- Vila Real Cathedral/Church and Convent of Saint Dominic (Portuguese: Sé de Vila Real/Igreja e convento de São Domingos)
- Viseu Cathedral/Cathedral of St. Mary (Portuguese: Sé de Viseu)

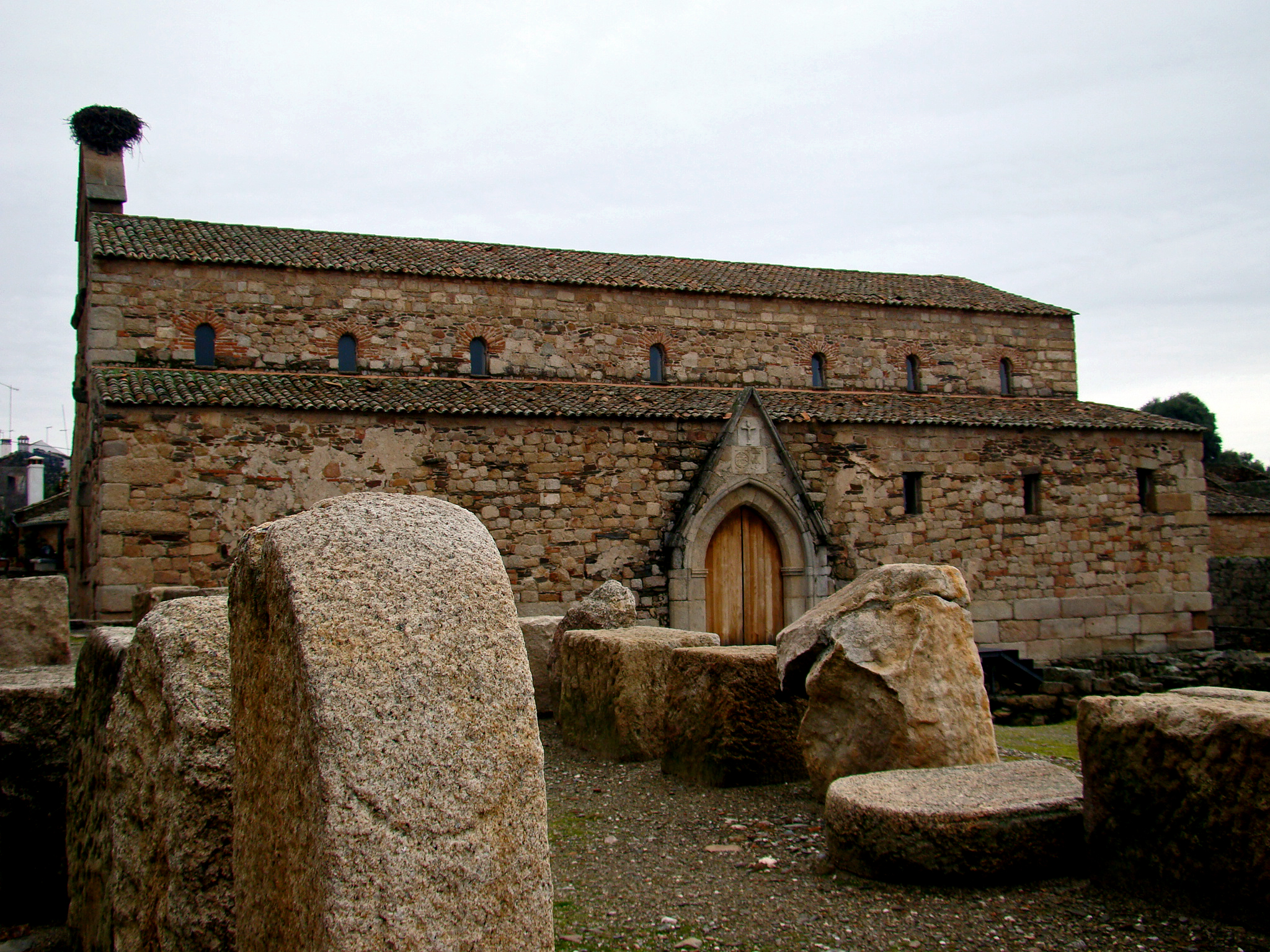
Idanha-a-Velha Cathedral

Former cathedrals

- Sé Cathedral of Bragança/Church of Saint John the Baptist (Portuguese: Colégio do Santo Nome de Jesus/Sé de Bragança/Igreja de São João Baptista)
- Sé Cathedral (Old) of Coimbra/Old Cathedral of Our Lady of the Assumption (Portuguese: Sé Velha de Coimbra/Igreja da Sé Velha)
- Cathedral of Elvas/Church of Our Lady of the Assumption (Portuguese: Sé de Elvas/Catedral de Elvas/Igreja de Nossa Senhora da Assunção)
- Cathedral of Idanha-a-Velha (Portuguese: Cathedral de Idanha-a-Velha)
- Silves Cathedral/Former Cathedral of Our Lady of the Assumption (Portuguese: Sé-Catedral de Silves)

== Anglican ==
Cathedrals of the Lusitanian Catholic Apostolic Evangelical Church:

- St Paul's Cathedral in São Paulo, Lisbon

== See also ==
- Lists of cathedrals
- Christianity in Portugal
  - Roman Catholicism in Portugal
  - Protestantism in Portugal
