= List of Catholic dioceses in Portugal =

Dioceses in Portugal

The Roman Catholic Church in Portugal is composed only of a Latin hierarchy, joint in the national episcopal conference of Portugal (Conferência Episcopal Portuguesa ), consisting of

- three ecclesiastical provinces, headed by Metropolitan Archbishops (one of which (Lisbon) holds the superior rank of Patriarch), with a total of 17 suffragan dioceses.
- an exempt military ordinariate.

There are no Eastern Catholic jurisdictions.

There is also an Apostolic Nunciature to Portugal as papal diplomatic representation (embassy-level), in the national capital Lisbon.

== Current Latin Dioceses ==
Ecclesiastical Province	Metropolitan	Metropolitan's Seat	Diocese	Diocese's Seat
Lisbon	Patriarchate of Lisbon	Cathedral of St. Mary Major	Diocese of Angra	Cathedral of the Holy Saviour
Lisbon	Patriarchate of Lisbon	Cathedral of St. Mary Major	Diocese of Funchal	Cathedral of Our Lady of the Assumption
Lisbon	Patriarchate of Lisbon	Cathedral of St. Mary Major	Diocese of Guarda	Cathedral of Guarda
Lisbon	Patriarchate of Lisbon	Cathedral of St. Mary Major	Diocese of Leiria-Fátima	Cathedral of Our Lady of the Conception
Lisbon	Patriarchate of Lisbon	Cathedral of St. Mary Major	Diocese of Portalegre-Castelo Branco	Cathedral of Portalegre Co-Cathedral of Castelo Branco
Lisbon	Patriarchate of Lisbon	Cathedral of St. Mary Major	Diocese of Santarém	Cathedral of Our Lady of the Assumption
Lisbon	Patriarchate of Lisbon	Cathedral of St. Mary Major	Diocese of Setúbal	Our Lady of Grace Cathedral
Braga	Primatial Archdiocese of Braga	Cathedral of Braga	Diocese of Aveiro	Cathedral of Aveiro
Braga	Primatial Archdiocese of Braga	Cathedral of Braga	Diocese of Bragança-Miranda	Cathedral of Braganza Co-Cathedral of Miranda do Douro
Braga	Primatial Archdiocese of Braga	Cathedral of Braga	Diocese of Coimbra	Cathedral of the Holy name of Jesus
Braga	Primatial Archdiocese of Braga	Cathedral of Braga	Diocese of Viana do Castelo	Cathedral of St Mary Major
Braga	Primatial Archdiocese of Braga	Cathedral of Braga	Diocese of Vila Real	Cathedral of Vila Real
Braga	Primatial Archdiocese of Braga	Cathedral of Braga	Diocese of Viseu	Cathedral of Viseu
Braga	Primatial Archdiocese of Braga	Cathedral of Braga	Diocese of Lamego	Cathedral of Our Lady of the Assumption
Braga	Primatial Archdiocese of Braga	Cathedral of Braga	Diocese of Porto	Cathedral of the Assumption of Our Lady
Évora	Archdiocese of Évora	Cathedral of Évora	Diocese of Beja	Cathedral of St. James the Greater
Évora	Archdiocese of Évora	Cathedral of Évora	Diocese of Faro	Cathedral of Saint Mary

=== Exempt : immediately subject to the Holy See ===
- Military Ordinariate of Portugal (Ordinariato Castrense de Portugal : army bishopric)

== Defunct jurisdictions ==
=== Titular sees ===
- Seven (Latin) Episcopal Titular bishoprics : Aquæ flaviæ, Diocese of Caliábria, Diocese of Dume, Diocese of Elvas, Diocese of Magnetum, Diocese of Penafiel, Diocese of Pinhel

=== Other defunct sees ===
- Diocese of Betecas, Diocese of Egitânia, Diocese of Elbora, Diocese of Miranda, Diocese of Olisipo, Diocese of Ossonoba, Diocese of Portucale, Diocese of Salácia, Diocese of Silves (Algarve precursor of present Faro).

== See also ==
- List of Catholic dioceses (structured view)

== Sources and external links ==
- GCatholic.org - data for all sections.
- Catholic-Hierarchy entry.
