= Américo Aguiar =

Portuguese Catholic bishop (born 1973)

His Eminence Dom Américo Aguiar
- Cardinal; Bishop of Setúbal
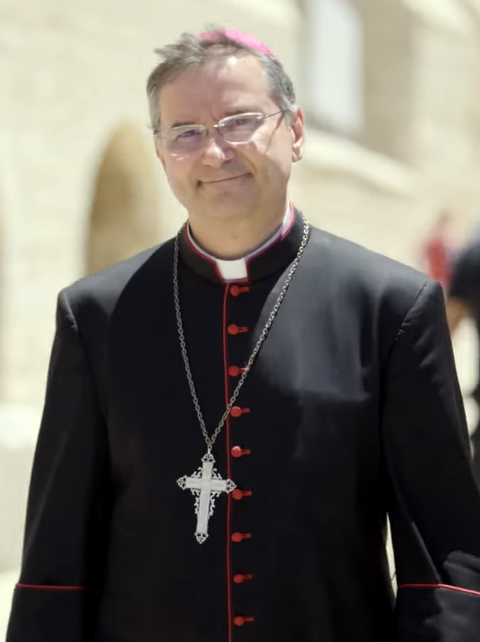
- Aguiar in 2023
- Church: Roman Catholic Church
- Archdiocese: Lisbon
- See: Setúbal
- Appointed: 21 September 2023
- Installed: 26 October 2023
- Other post: Cardinal Priest of Sant'Antonio da Padova in Via Merulana (2023-)
- Previous posts: Vicar general of Porto (2004-16); Auxiliary bishop of Lisbon (2019–2023); Titular Bishop of Dagnum (2019–2023)

Orders
- Ordination: 8 July 2001 by Armindo Lopes Coelho
- Consecration: 31 March 2019 by Manuel Jose Macario do Nascimento Clemente
- Created cardinal: 30 September 2023 by Pope Francis
- Rank: Cardinal-Priest

Personal details
- Born: Américo Manuel Alves Aguiar; 12 December 1973 (age 52) Leça do Balio, Porto, Portugal
- Education: Catholic University of Portugal
- Motto: In manus Tuas ("Into Your hands")
- Coat of arms

Américo Manuel Alves Aguiar (born 12 December 1973) is a Portuguese prelate of the Catholic Church who has been bishop of Setúbal since 2023. He was an auxiliary bishop of the Patriarchate of Lisbon from 2019 to 2023 and headed the organization responsible for planning World Youth Day in August 2023.

Pope Francis made him a cardinal on 30 September 2023.

== Biography ==
Américo Aguiar was born in Leça do Balio in Matosinhos in the Porto metropolitan area on 12 December 1973. He participated in electoral politics in his youth in both Matosinhos and the neighboring municipality of Maia, working with members of the city council in both. He served on the City Council of Matosinhos from 1994 to 1997 as a member of the Socialist Party. He has called his political engagement "great fun" (divertidíssimo).

After completing middle school, he entered the seminary in Ermesinde and then studied at the major seminary of the Diocese of Porto and the Porto section of the Portuguese Catholic University.

He was ordained a priest of the Diocese of Porto on 8 July 2001 by Armindo Lopes Coelho, Bishop of Porto.

He served as parish priest of São Pedro de Azevedo (Campanhã) from 2001 to 2002; special secretary to the bishop of Porto, Armindo Lopes Coelho, and parish priest of the cathedral from 2002 to 2004; and vicar general of the diocese from 2004 to 2006. In 2014 he earned a master's degree in communication sciences from the Catholic University of Portugal, Lisbon.

He was president of the administrative board of Rádio Renascença (Lisbon) from 2017 while continuing to provide pastoral services in Porto. In 2017 he became national director of the Secretariat of Church Social Communications and head of the Episcopal Commission for Culture, Cultural Assets and Social Communications. He led the diocese's Fellowship of Priests from 2011 to 2019.

On 1 March 2019, Pope Francis appointed him auxiliary bishop of Lisbon and titular bishop of Dagno. He received his episcopal ordination from the Cardinal Patriarch of Lisbon, Manuel Clemente, at the Santissima Trindade Church in Porto on 31 March 2019. He was then the youngest bishop in Portugal. In January 2023, he praised the funeral Mass for Pope Benedict XVI, saying it balanced Benedict's desire for simplicity with the significance of the occasion.

He led the Commission for the Protection of Minors and Vulnerable Persons of the Patriarchate of Lisbon until March 2023, when the Portuguese Episcopal Conference decided that only laypeople should serve on such bodies. He heads Fundação da JMJ, the body responsible for organizing World Youth Day in Portugal on 1–6 August 2023. In July 2023, being responsible for World Youth Day 2023, he stated in an interview that the purpose of the event was not "to convert young people to Christ". The comment drew some criticism from the faithful, members of the clergy and the media.

On 9 July 2023, Pope Francis announced plans to make him a cardinal at a consistory scheduled for 30 September. Aguiar will be the second youngest cardinal. He said his appointment "has to do with youth, it has to do with Portugal, it has to do with World Youth Day" rather than himself. That this results in two active cardinals from the see of Lisbon has been called "a genuine novelty" and provoked speculation about his future in the Roman Curia. At that consistory he was made cardinal priest of Sant'Antonio da Padova in Via Merulana. At the time, he was the second youngest member of the College of Cardinals.

Pope Francis named him bishop of Setúbal on 21 September 2023. He was installed there as the fourth bishop of Setúbal on 26 October.

He participated as a cardinal elector in the 2025 papal conclave that elected Pope Leo XIV.

== Coat of arms ==
Coat of arms of Américo Aguiar
Notes This coat of arms was adopted after he was created cardinal Adopted 30 September 2023 Motto IN MANUS TUAS (Latin for "INTO YOUR HANDS Ps 31:6") Previous versions

== See also ==
- Cardinals created by Francis

== Notes ==
Catholic Church titles
Preceded by Ángel Francisco Caraballo Fermín	— TITULAR — Titular Bishop of Dagnum; 2019 – 2023	Succeeded by Onécimo Alberton
Preceded by José Ornelas Carvalho	Bishop of Setúbal; 2023 – present	Incumbent
Preceded by Cláudio Hummes	Cardinal Priest of Sant'Antonio da Padova in Via Merulana; 2023 – present	Incumbent
