= José Ornelas Carvalho =

Portuguese Catholic prelate

His Most Reverend Excellency José Ornelas Carvalho, S.C.J.
- Bishop of Leiria-Fátima
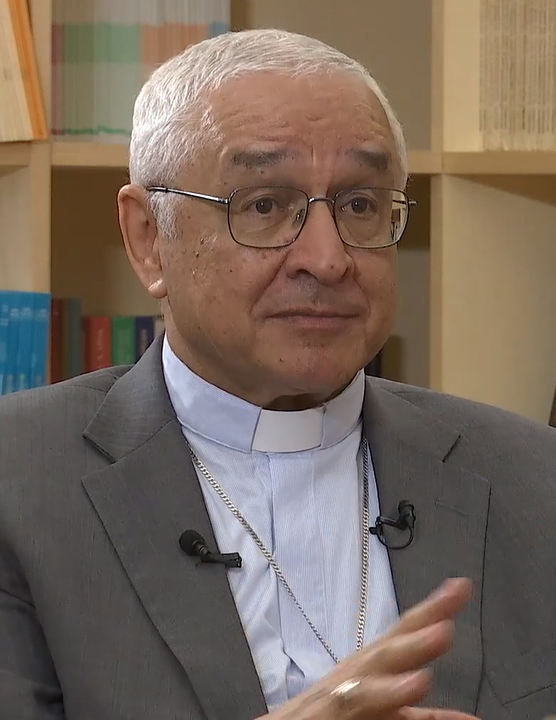
- José Ornelas Carvalho in 2023
- Church: Roman Catholic Church
- Metropolis: Patriarchate of Lisbon
- Diocese: Leiria-Fátima
- Appointed: 28 January 2022
- Installed: 13 March 2022
- Predecessor: António Marto
- Previous posts: Superior General of the Congregation of the Priests of the Sacred Heart (2003–15); Bishop of Setúbal (2015–22)

Orders
- Ordination: 9 August 1981
- Consecration: 25 October 2015 by Manuel Clemente

Personal details
- Born: 5 January 1954 (age 72) Porto da Cruz, Madeira, Portugal
- Denomination: Roman Catholic
- Motto: "O Filho do Homem veio para servir e dar a vida" ("The Son of Man came to serve and to give his life", Mk 10:45)
- Coat of arms

José Ornelas Carvalho, SCJ (born 5 January 1954) is a Portuguese prelate of the Catholic Church who has been bishop of Leiria-Fátima since 2022. He was the bishop of Setúbal from 2015 to 2022. He was the Superior-General of the Congregation of the Priests of the Sacred Heart from 2003 to 2015.

He was elected to a three-year term as President of the Portuguese Episcopal Conference in 2020.

== Early life ==
José Ornelas Carvalho was born in 1954 in the parish of Porto da Cruz, in Machico, Madeira, the son of António Tomás Carvalho and Benvinda de Ornelas. He studied at the Diocesan Minor Seminary of Funchal from 1964 to 1967. Wishing to become a missionary, he joined the Missionary College of the Priests of the Sacred Heart in Funchal (1967-1969), and then studied at the Congregation's Missionary Institute in Coimbra (1969-1971).

On 29 September 1972 he made his temporary vows in Aveiro and, after two years of studies in philosophy, he spent two years as a missionary in Mozambique, from 1974 to 1976. Back in Lisbon, he concluded his degree in theology from the Catholic University of Portugal, in 1979.

== Ordained ministry ==
=== Priesthood ===
He was ordained priest on 9 August 1981, in his hometown of Porto da Cruz, in a ceremony presided by Maurílio de Gouveia, then Titular Archbishop of Mitylene. In 1983, he started teaching at the Faculty of Theology of the Catholic University of Portugal; he interrupted his teaching activities to prepare his doctorate in Biblical Theology in Rome and Germany, which he concluded on 14 July 1997. He also taught at the Major Seminary of Our Lady of Fátima, in Alfragide.

José Ornelas Carvalho was elected Superior General of the Congregation of the Priests of the Sacred Heart on 27 May 2003, after having served as the Provincial Superior of the Dehonian Portuguese Province. He was in the position until 6 June 2015.

=== Episcopate ===
He was appointed Bishop of Setúbal on 24 August 2015, by Pope Francis, succeeding Gilberto Canavarro dos Reis; he received his episcopal consecration on 25 October 2015 from the Patriarch of Lisbon Manuel Clemente in the Cathedral of Our Lady of Grace, in Setúbal.

Pope Francis appointed him bishop of Leiria-Fátima on 28 January 2022. He was installed there on 13 March.

== Allegations of cover-up of sexual abuse cases ==
In October 2022, it was reported that José Ornelas is being investigated by the Portuguese Attorney General's Office on suspicion of "participation in the cover-up" of cases of sexual abuse of minors.

The case allegedly happened in 2011, in Mozambique, when José Ornelas was a high-ranking representative of the Dehonians (Congregation of Priests of the Sacred Heart of Jesus), a congregation to which the priest who ran the orphanage where the abuse allegedly occurred belonged.

Catholic Church titles
Preceded by Virginio Bressanelli	Superior General of the Priests of the Sacred Heart; 2003 – 2015	Succeeded by Heiner Wilmer
Preceded by Gilberto Canavarro dos Reis	Bishop of Setúbal; 2015 – 2022	Vacant
Preceded by Manuel Clemente	President of the Portuguese Episcopal Conference; 2020 – present	Incumbent
Preceded by António Marto	Bishop of Leiria-Fátima; 2022–present	Incumbent
