= Our Lady of the Assumption Cathedral, Santarém =

Coordinates: 39°13′59″N 8°41′12″W

Cathedral of Our Lady of the Immaculate Conception
- Sé Catedral de Nossa Senhora da Conceição
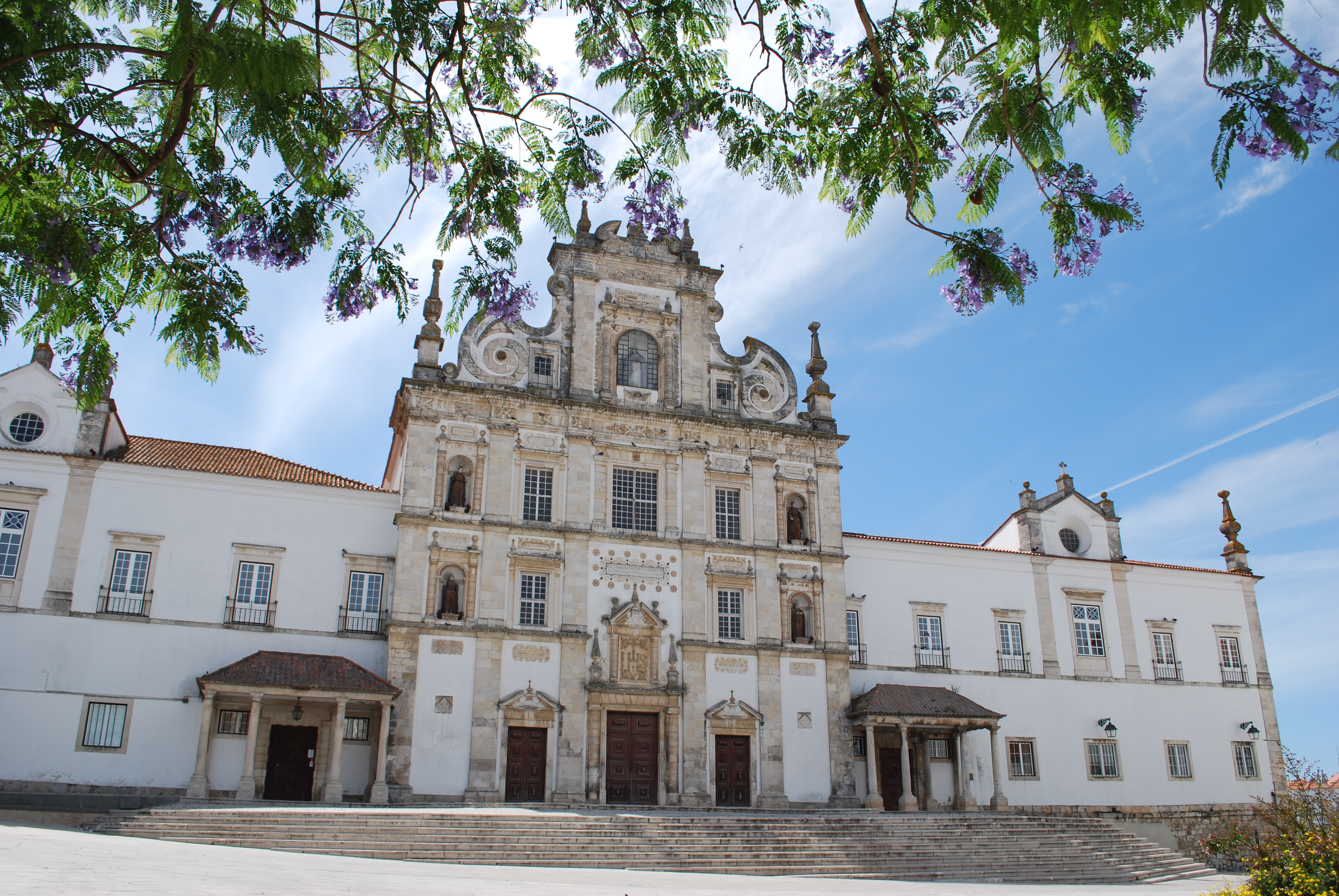
- Cathedral of Our Lady of the Immaculate Conception
- Location: Santarém
- Country: Portugal
- Denomination: Roman Catholic Church

The Cathedral of Our Lady of the Immaculate Conception (Portuguese: Sé Catedral de Nossa Senhora da Conceição; Igreja de Nossa Senhora da Conceição do Colégio dos Jesuítas) also called Santarém Cathedral formerly known as Church of Our Lady of the Immaculate Conception, is located in the historic centre of Santarém, more precisely in the parish of São Salvador in Portugal.

== History ==
This Jesuit church, dating from the seventeenth century, was erected on the site of the royal palace of the Alcazaba Nova, abandoned since the time of King John II. Later, with the expulsion of the Jesuits from Portugal by order of the Marquis of Pombal, the building became host to the Patriarchal Seminary after being donated by D. Maria I for this purpose, and it remained in that use until the twentieth century.

When the Diocese of Santarém was created, in 1975, the church was elevated to the status of cathedral.

The Diocesan Museum of Santarém is located in the Episcopal Palace, part of the Cathedral complex.

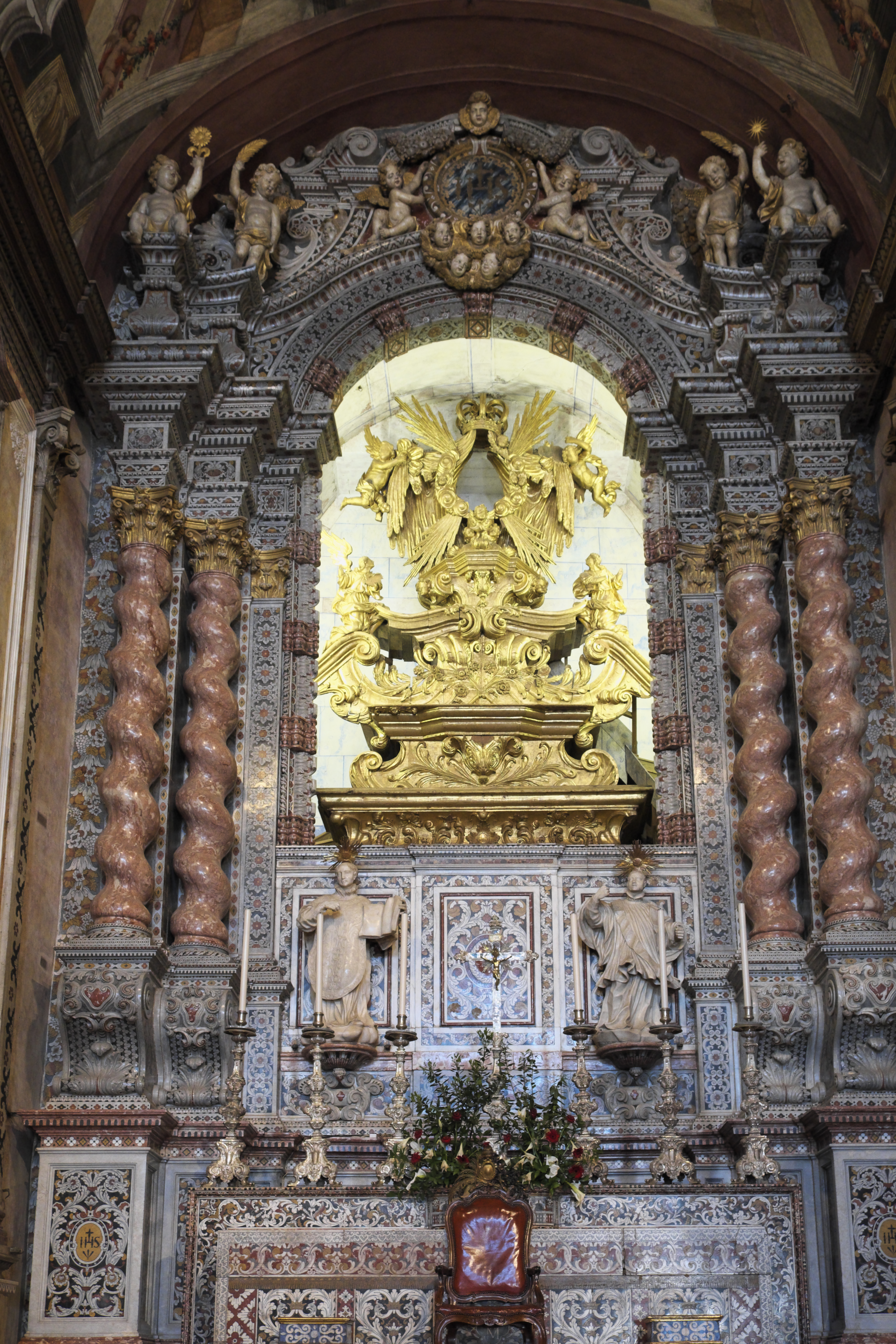
Internal view

== See also ==
- List of Jesuit sites
- Roman Catholicism in Portugal
- Our Lady of the Immaculate Conception
