= Portuguese Episcopal Conference =

Assembly of Catholic bishops

The Portuguese Episcopal Conference (Portuguese: Conferência Episcopal Portuguesa - CEP), founded on September 1, 2000, is the grouping of the bishops of the Roman Catholic Church in Portugal and is organised under the terms of Canon 447 of the Code of Canon Law promulgated on 25 January 1983. The Portuguese Episcopal Conference groups together all the dioceses based in territory under Portuguese sovereignty, and its civil legal status in the Portuguese legal system is recognized by article 8 of the 2004 Concordat.

== Framework and Structure ==
The Code of Canon Law establishes that an Episcopal Conference is a permanent institution, constituting itself as the grouping of Bishops of a nation or certain territory, who jointly exercise certain pastoral functions in favor of the faithful of their territory, in order to promote the greatest good that the Church offers to men, above all through forms and methods of apostolate conveniently adjusted to the circumstances of the time and place, in accordance with the law (can. 447). This definition is reinforced in the Apostolic Letter Apostolos Suos, of May 21, 1998, which clarifies the theological and legal status of Episcopal Conferences, defining them as institutions of ecclesiastical law and not as a supranational body that conditions the action of Bishops. in their Dioceses.

This Apostolic Letter establishes in its §20 that:

In the Episcopal Conference, the Bishops jointly exercise the episcopal ministry for the benefit of the faithful in the territory of the Conference; but, for such an exercise to be legitimate and obligatory for each of the Bishops, the intervention of the supreme authority of the Church is necessary, which, through universal law or special mandates, entrusts certain issues to the deliberation of the Episcopal Conference. Bishops, whether individually or gathered in a Conference, cannot autonomously limit their sacred power in favor of the Episcopal Conference, and even less of a part of it, whether this be the Permanent Council, a commission, or the President himself. This truth is evident in the canonical norm relating to the exercise of legislative power by Bishops gathered in an Episcopal Conference. The Episcopal Conference can only make general decrees in cases where universal law prescribes it or when a peculiar mandate from the Apostolic See establishes it motu proprio or at the request of the Conference itself. Otherwise, the competence of each diocesan Bishop remains intact, and neither the Conference nor its President can act on behalf of all Bishops, unless each and every one has given their consent.

The current members of the Episcopal Conference are all Portuguese bishops and archbishops. The governing body of the conference is the Presidency. Between sessions of the conference, which meet twice a year, operates the Permanent Council, composed of a chairman, vice-chairman, secretary and two permanent members.

=== Relationship with the Portuguese Republic ===
By article 8 of the 2004 Concordat, the Holy See and the Portuguese Republic grant a prominent institutional role to the CEP at the civil level, allowing within the scope of its competences for it to conclude agreements and protocols with the State and establishing that the CEP may be heard on matters relating to the Concordat and others that have implications for the action of the Catholic Church in Portugal and its relationship with civil society.

== Presidency ==
1. Manuel Gonçalves Cerejeira, Cardinal-Patriarch of Lisbon (1958–1972)
2. Manuel de Almeida Trindade, Bishop of Aveiro (1972–1975)
3. António Ribeiro, Cardinal-Patriarch of Lisbon (1975–1981)
4. Manuel de Almeida Trindade, Bishop of Aveiro (1981–1987)
5. António Ribeiro, Cardinal-Patriarch of Lisbon (1987–1993)
6. João Alves, Bishop of Coimbra (1993–1999)
7. José da Cruz Policarpo, Cardinal-Patriarch of Lisbon (1999–2005)
8. Jorge Ferreira da Costa Ortiga, Archebishop-Primate of Braga (April 4, 2005 – May 3, 2011)
9. José da Cruz Policarpo, Cardinal-Patriarch of Lisbon (May 3, 2011 – May 18, 2013)
10. Manuel Clemente, Cardinal-Patriarch of Lisbon (June 19, 2013 – June 16, 2020)
11. José Ornelas Carvalho, Bishop of Setúbal and later Bishop of Leiria-Fátima (June 16, 2020–April 14, 2026)
12. Virgílio do Nascimento Antunes, Bishop of Coimbra (14 April 2026 – present)

== Permanent Council ==
The current members of the Permanent Council are:

1. Virgílio do Nascimento Antunes, Bishop of Coimbra – President
2. José Manuel Garcia Cordeiro, Archbishop of Braga – Vice-president
3. António Augusto Azevedo, Bishop of Vila Real – Member of the Permanent Council
4. Armando Esteves Domingues, Bishop of Angra do Heroísmo – Member of the Permanent Council
5. José Augusto Traquina Maria, Bishop of Santarém – Member of the Permanent Council
6. António Moiteiro, Bishop of Aveiro – Member of the Permanent Council
7. Rui Manuel Sousa Valério, Patriarch of Lisbon – ex officio Member of the Permanent Council
8. Manuel Joaquim Gomes Barbosa, Priest – Secretary of the Permanent Council

== The Conference Board ==
Standing Committee, acting under the Catholic Bishops' Conference of Portugal:

- Commission on the Social and Cultural Affairs
- Commission for Ecumenism
- The Commission on Christian Education
- Commission on the Laity and Family
- Liturgical Commission
- Missionary Committee
- Commission on Refugees and Exiles
- The Board of Pastoral Care

== See also ==
- Annuario Pontificio, Vatican, 2003
- Catholic Church in Portugal
