= Our Lady of the Immaculate Conception Cathedral, Leiria =

Coordinates: 39.7461°N 8.8067°W

Our Lady of the Immaculate Conception Cathedral
- Sé Catedral de Nossa Senhora da Conceição
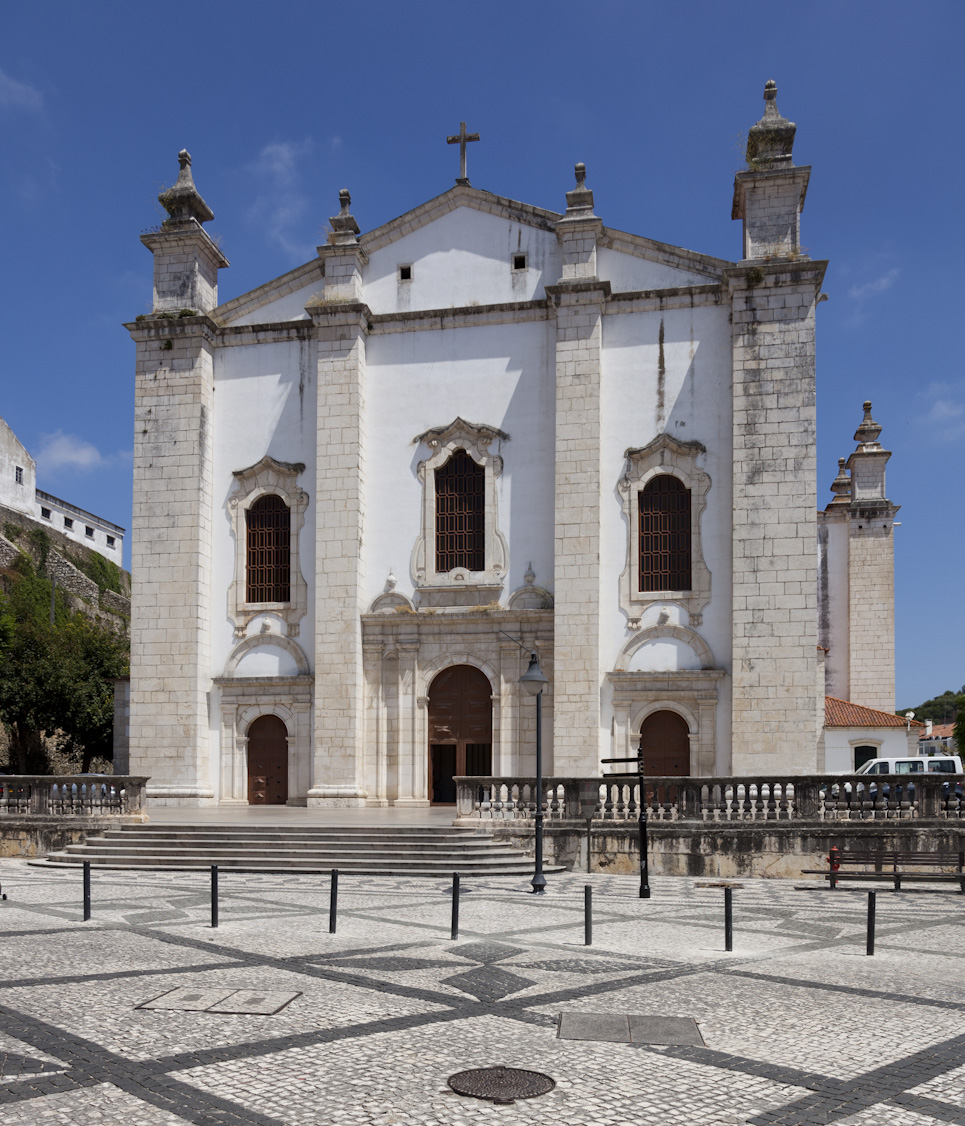
- Our Lady of the Immaculate Conception Cathedral
- Location: Leiria
- Country: Portugal
- Denomination: Roman Catholic Church

The Our Lady of the Immaculate Conception Cathedral (Portuguese: Sé Catedral de Nossa Senhora da Conceição) also called Leiria Cathedral It is a Catholic church built in the center of the city of Leiria, Portugal.

The church was built between 1550 and 1574, according to a project by architect Afonso Alvares. The city had been elevated to a diocese in 1545, thanks to a request of John III to Pope Paul III. Because the churches of Nossa Senhora da Pena and San Pedro were too small for the population, building a new one is needed suitable for the new church dignity. The first stone was laid on August 1, 1550, becoming one of the most important buildings of the late Renaissance in Portugal.

The building was later altered successive stages, according to the taste of the bishops of the diocese. The cathedral was partially destroyed in the 1755 Lisbon earthquake, so reforms that gave the current robust appearance were made. Of the original construction, the front facade, just 3 remaining panels at the entrance, two of which correspond to the central or higher. The building was also damaged during the Peninsular War in 1811, French troops set fire, destroying much of its interior decoration.

== See also ==
- Roman Catholicism in Portugal
- Our Lady of the Immaculate Conception

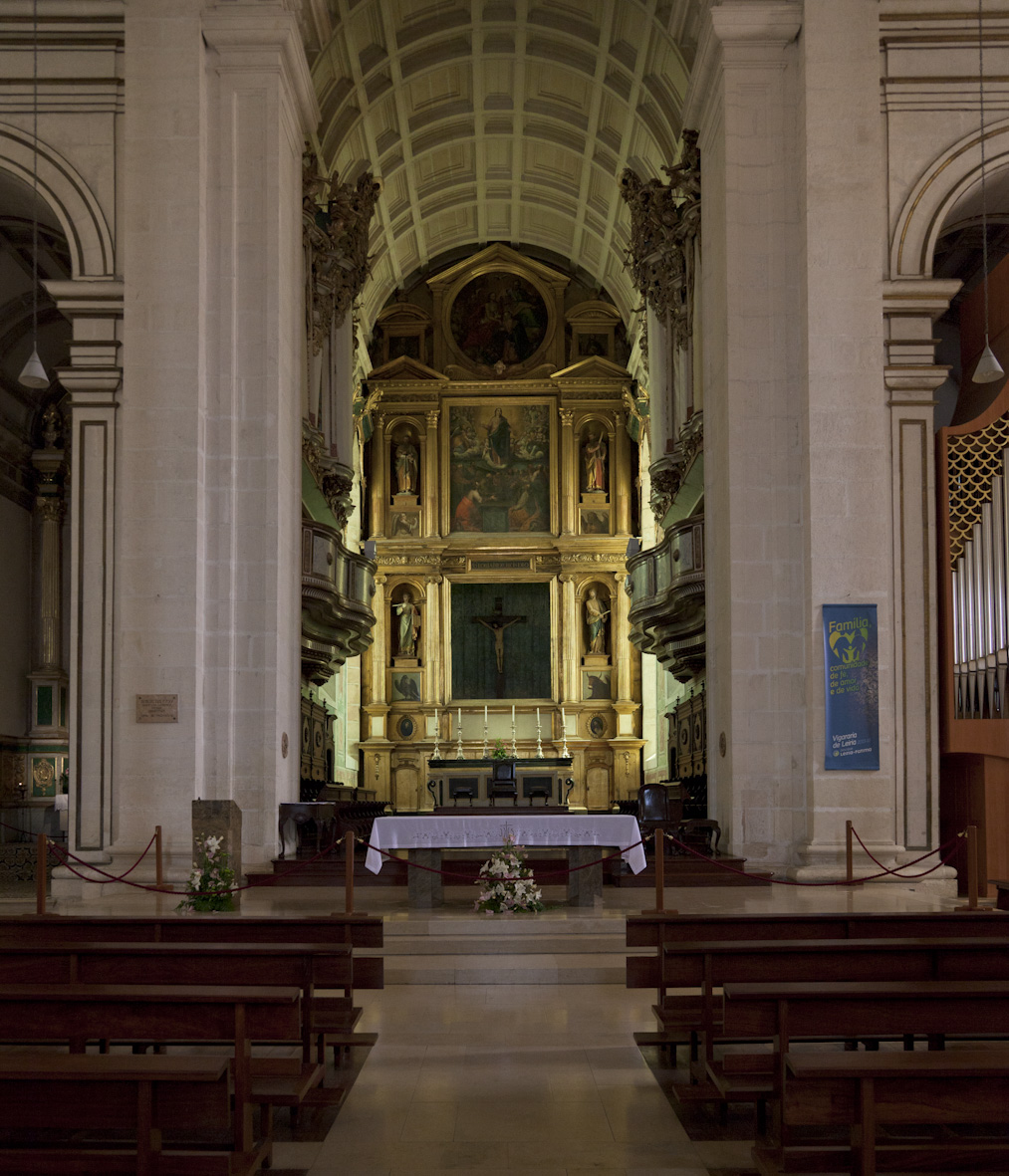
Internal view
