= Daniel Batalha Henriques =

Portuguese Roman Catholic prelate (1966–2022)

His Excellency Daniel Batalha Henriques
- Auxiliary Bishop of Lisbon
- Appointed: 13 October 2018
- Term ended: 4 November 2022
- Other post: Titular Bishop of Aquae Thibilitanae (2018–2022)

Orders
- Ordination: 1 July 1990
- Consecration: 25 November 2018 by Manuel José Macário do Nascimento Clemente

Personal details
- Born: 30 March 1966 Mafra, Portugal
- Died: 4 November 2022 (aged 56) Lisbon, Portugal
- Motto: OMNES FONTES MEI IN TE
- Coat of arms

Styles of Daniel Batalha Henriques
- Reference style: His Excellency; The Most Reverend
- Spoken style: Your Excellency
- Religious style: Bishop

Daniel Batalha Henriques (30 March 1966 – 4 November 2022) was a Portuguese Roman Catholic prelate.

Batalha Henriques was born in Portugal and was ordained to the priesthood in 1990 for the Patriarchate of Lisbon. He served as titular bishop of Aquea Thibiltanae and was the auxiliary bishop of the same Patriarchate from 2018 until his death in 2022.

Catholic Church titles
Preceded by —	Auxiliary Bishop of Lisbon; 2018–2022	Succeeded by —
Preceded by Yves-Marie-Henri Bescond	Titular Bishop of Aquae Thibilitanae; 2018–2022	Succeeded by Vacant
