= Inter praecipuas apostolici ministerii =

1737 papal bull regarding the Patriarch of Lisbon

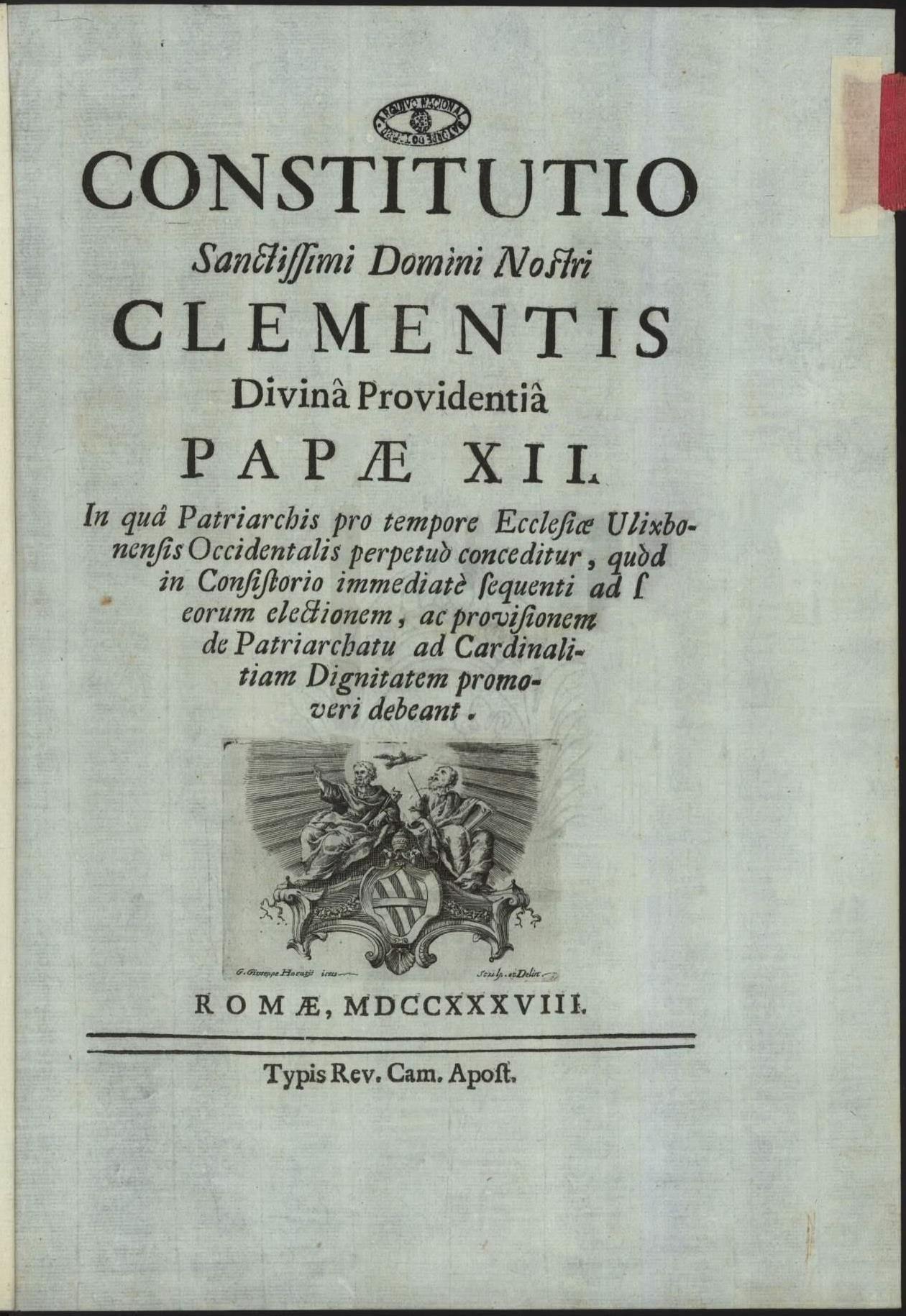
Title page of a 1738 printed edition of Inter praecipuas apostolici ministerii (Portuguese National Archive)

Inter praecipuas apostolici ministerii (Note: Latin pronunciation: [ˈin.ter preˈt͡ʃi.pu.as a.posˈto.li.t͡ʃi mi.nisˈte.ri.i]) was a papal bull issued by Pope Clement XII, on 17 December 1737, establishing that whoever was appointed Patriarch of Lisbon was to be elevated to the rank of cardinal in the next consistory. Lisbon remains the only episcopal see accorded this distinction. Until 2013, all Popes honored this commitment. Others like the Patriarch of Venice used to be made cardinals in the consistory following their appointment, but only by tradition.

Since the Second Vatican Council (1963-1965), cardinals cease to act as electors upon reaching the age of 80. By tradition there should not be two cardinal electors from the same see, so that in the case of an existing Patriarch Emeritus, the privilege of the new Patriarch of Lisbon becoming a Cardinal only applies in the next consistory after the former Patriarch dies or reaches the age of 80.

The last time this privilege was used was for Manuel Clemente, appointed Patriarch of Lisbon in May 2013. Because José da Cruz Policarpo, former Patriarch, was still under 80, Clemente was not made a cardinal in the next consistory in February 2014. However, after the death of Policarpo in 2014, Clemente was made a cardinal in the next consistory for creating cardinals in February 2015.
