= Sant'Antonio da Padova in Via Merulana =

Roman Catholic basilica, a landmark of Rome, Italy

Church of Saint Anthony of Padua al Laterano
- Sant'Antonio da Padova all'Esquilino (in Italian); S. Antonii Patavini de Urbe (in Latin)
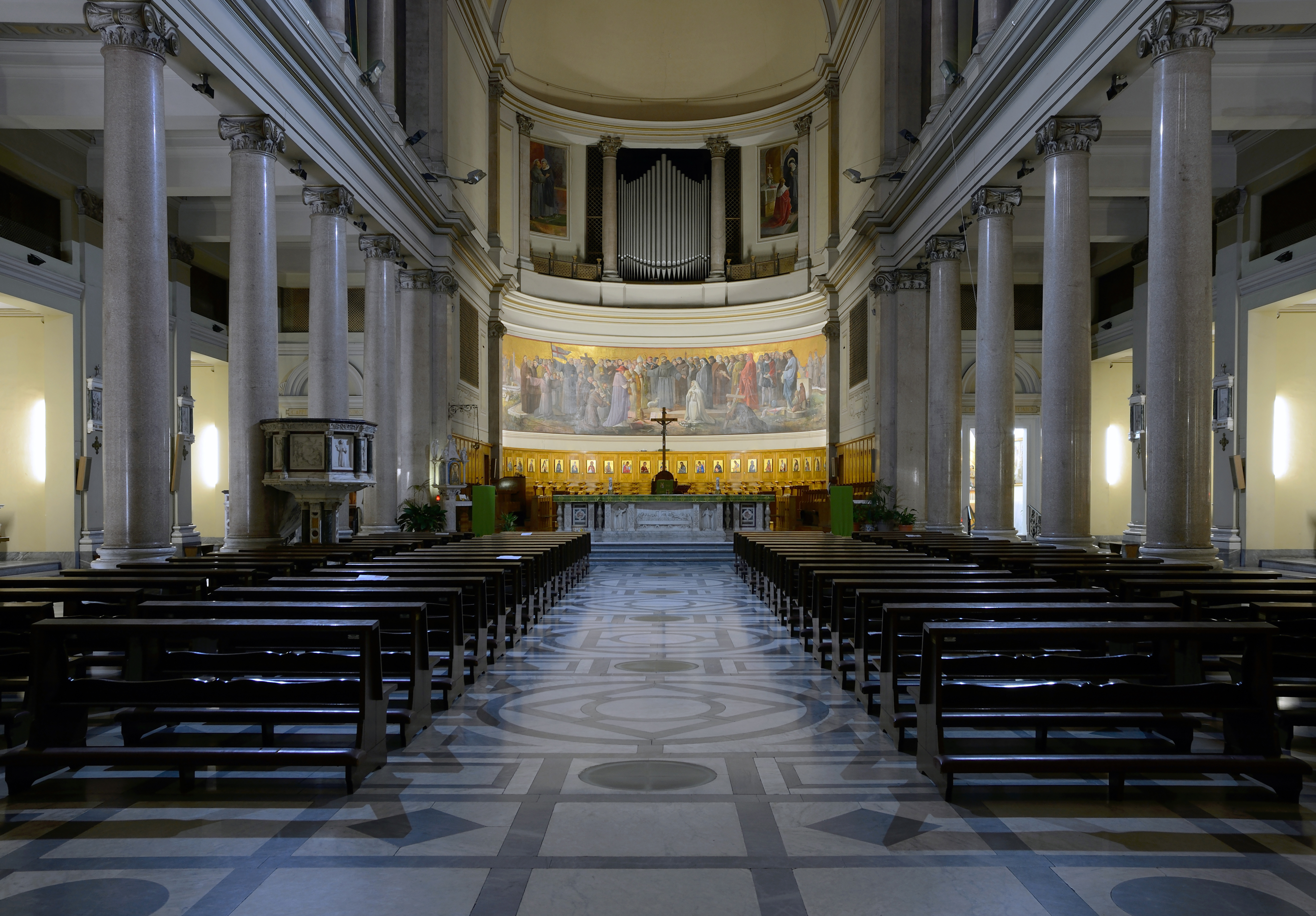
- Facade of Sant'Antonio da Padova in Via Merulana
- Click on the map for a fullscreen view
- 41°53′19.71″N 12°30′14.2″E
- Location: Via Merulana 124-B, Rome
- Country: Italy
- Denomination: Roman Catholic
- Tradition: Latin
- Website: Official website

History
- Status: Minor basilica, titular church
- Dedication: Anthony of Padua
- Consecrated: 1888

Architecture
- Architect: Luca Carimini
- Architectural type: Church
- Groundbreaking: 1884
- Completed: 1888

Specifications
- Materials: Marble

Administration
- Province: Rome

The Basilica of Saint Anthony of Padua al Laterano (Italian: Sant'Antonio da Padova all'Esquilino, Latin: S. Antonii Patavini de Urbe) is a Roman Catholic titular church in Rome on Via Merulana, one block from the Obelisk of St. John Lateran. It was built for the Order of Friars Minor, who needed a new home after they were moved from Santa Maria in Ara Coeli to allow the construction of the Victor Emmanuel II Monument.

The church was consecrated on 4 December 1887 and was elevated to minor basilica status in 1931.

On 12 March 1960 Pope John XXIII made it a titular church as a seat for cardinals. The current cardinal priest of the Titulus Sancti Antonii Patavini de Urbe is Américo Aguiar.

== Architecture ==
Two staircases provide access to the gantry of the church, where a statue of Saint Anthony of Padua stands holding the Christ Child. Inside, the church is constructed of three naves, divided by two columns of pillars made of pink marble. The general decoration of the church was done by Friar Bonaventura Loffredo da Alghero in 1889–1890. The fresco of the apotheosis of the Franciscan family in the apse area of the sanctuary was done by Friar Loffredo.

The paintings of the side altars were done by various artists, mainly Franciscan: St. Clare of Assisi by Giuseppe Bravi (1844–1908); St. Francis of Assisi by Franz De Rhoden (1817–1903); Japanese Martyrs crucified in 1597 in Nagasaki by Cesare Mariani (1826–1901); Immaculate Mary by Francesco Szoldatiez (1916); St. Ludovico di Tolosa by Eugenia Pignet (1940). Other paintings were done by the friars Giuseppe Maria Rossi, Caio D' Andrea and Michelangelo Cianti.

== List of cardinal priests ==
- Peter Doi (28 March 1960 – 21 February 1970)
- António Ribeiro (5 March 1973 – 24 March 1998)
- Cláudio Hummes (21 February 2001 – 4 July 2022)
- Américo Aguiar (30 September 2023 – Present)

== See also ==
- Basilica of Saint Anthony of Padua, in Padua

== Notes ==
Preceded by Sant'Andrea della Valle	Landmarks of Rome; Sant'Antonio da Padova in Via Merulana	Succeeded by Sant'Apollinare, Rome
