= Our Lady of the Assumption Cathedral, Elvas =

Coordinates: 38.8810°N 7.1639°W

Our Lady of the Assumption Cathedral
- Sé Catedral Nossa Senhora d’Assunção
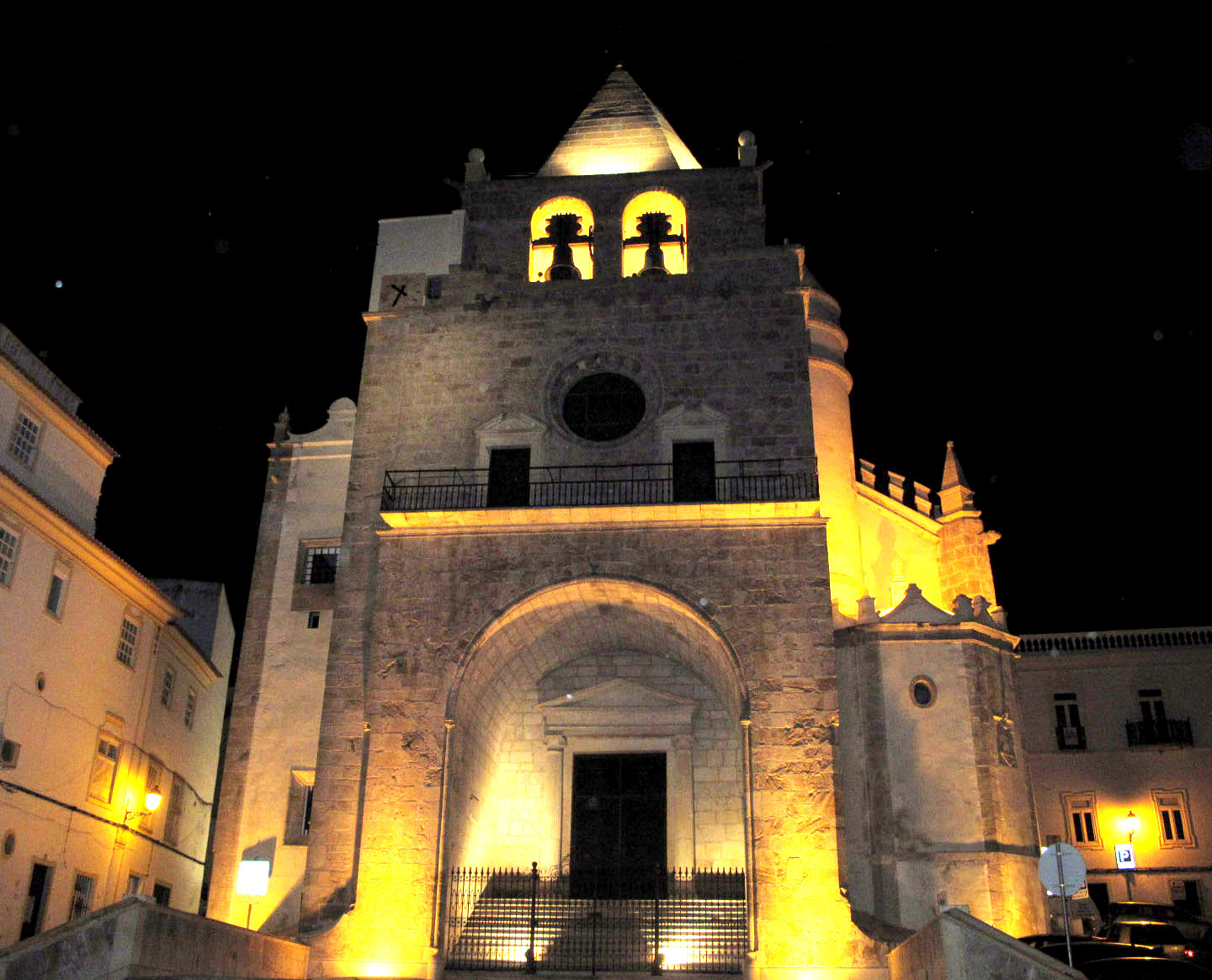
- Our Lady of the Assumption Cathedral
- Location: Elvas
- Country: Portugal
- Denomination: Roman Catholic Church

The Our Lady of the Assumption Cathedral (Portuguese: Sé Catedral Nossa Senhora d’Assunção; Antiga Sé de Elvas) also called Old Cathedral of Elvas is a religious building of the Catholic Church in the Republic Square, in the parish of the Assumption in the city of Elvas, in the district of Portalegre in Portugal.

Inserted in the context of the War of Restoration, the old Cathedral of Elvas was used as a place of prayer for good return of thousands of soldiers who participated in the war.

In 2014, the old cathedral of Elvas was part of a new project of the Ministry of National Defense, created with the support of agency Turismo de Portugal, called military tourism, which aims to revitalize ancient historical points of Portugal, by creating thematic itineraries based on the stories of Portuguese heroes.

== See also ==
- Roman Catholicism in Portugal

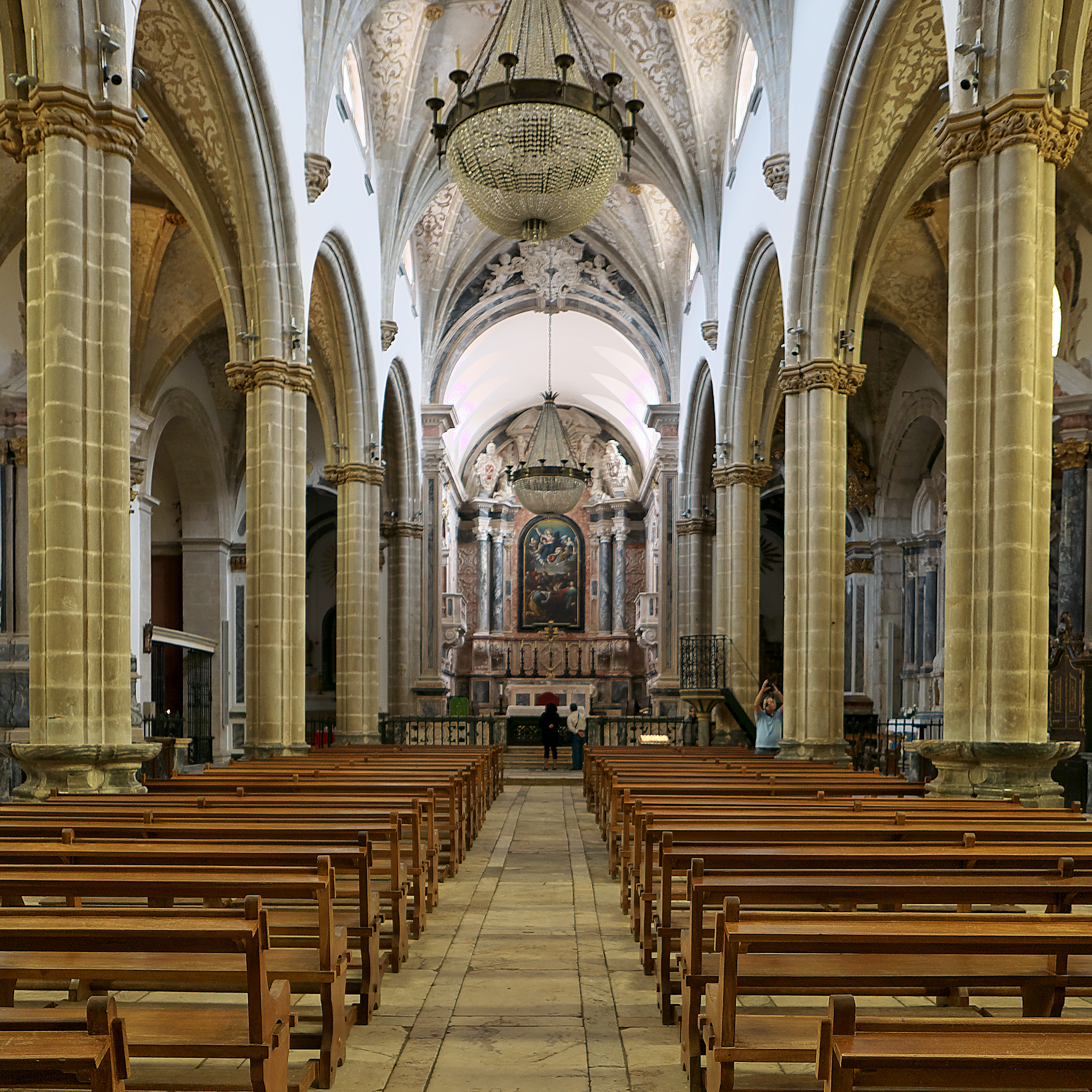
Internal view
