= Diocese of Setúbal =

Roman Catholic diocese in Portugal

Diocese of Setúbal Dioecesis Setubalensis Diocese de Setúbal

Catholic
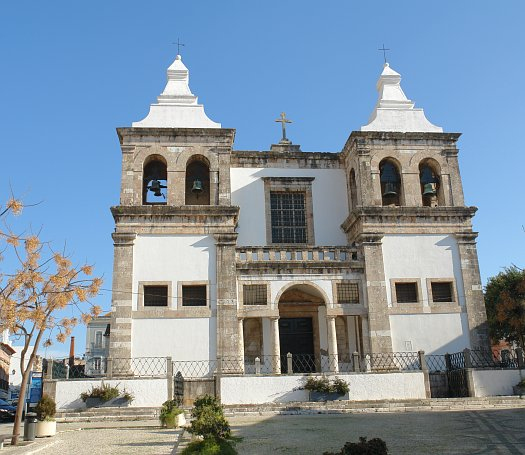
- Our Lady of Grace Cathedral, Setúbal

Location
- Country: Portugal
- Ecclesiastical province: Lisbon
- Metropolitan: Patriarchate of Lisbon

Statistics
- Area: 1,500 km^{2} (580 sq mi)
- Population: Total; Catholics: (as of 2004); 650,000; 550,000 (84.6%)

Information
- Denomination: Roman Catholic
- Sui iuris church: Latin Church
- Rite: Roman Rite
- Established: 16 July 1975
- Cathedral: Our Lady of Grace Cathedral, Setúbal

Current leadership
- Pope: Leo XIV
- Bishop: Cardinal Américo Aguiar
- Metropolitan Archbishop: Manuel III
- Bishops emeritus: Gilberto Canavarro dos Reis

Map
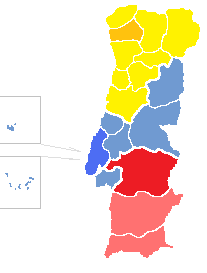

Website
- Website of the Diocese

The Diocese of Setúbal (Latin: Dioecesis Setubalensis) is a Latin Church diocese of the Catholic church in Portugal. It has existed since 1975. It is a suffragan of the archdiocese of Lisbon. Its see at Setúbal is south of Lisbon.

== Ordinaries ==
- Manuel da Silva Martins (16 July 1975 - 23 April 1998)
- Gilberto Délio Gonçalves Canavarro dos Reis (23 April 1998 - 24 August 2015)
- José Ornelas Carvalho, S.C.I. (24 August 2015 - 28 January 2022)
- Cardinal Américo Aguiar (21 September 2023 – present)

== See also ==
- History of Setúbal
- Timeline of Setúbal
