= Faro Cathedral =

Cathedral in Faro, Portugal

Coordinates: 37°00′48″N 7°56′05″W

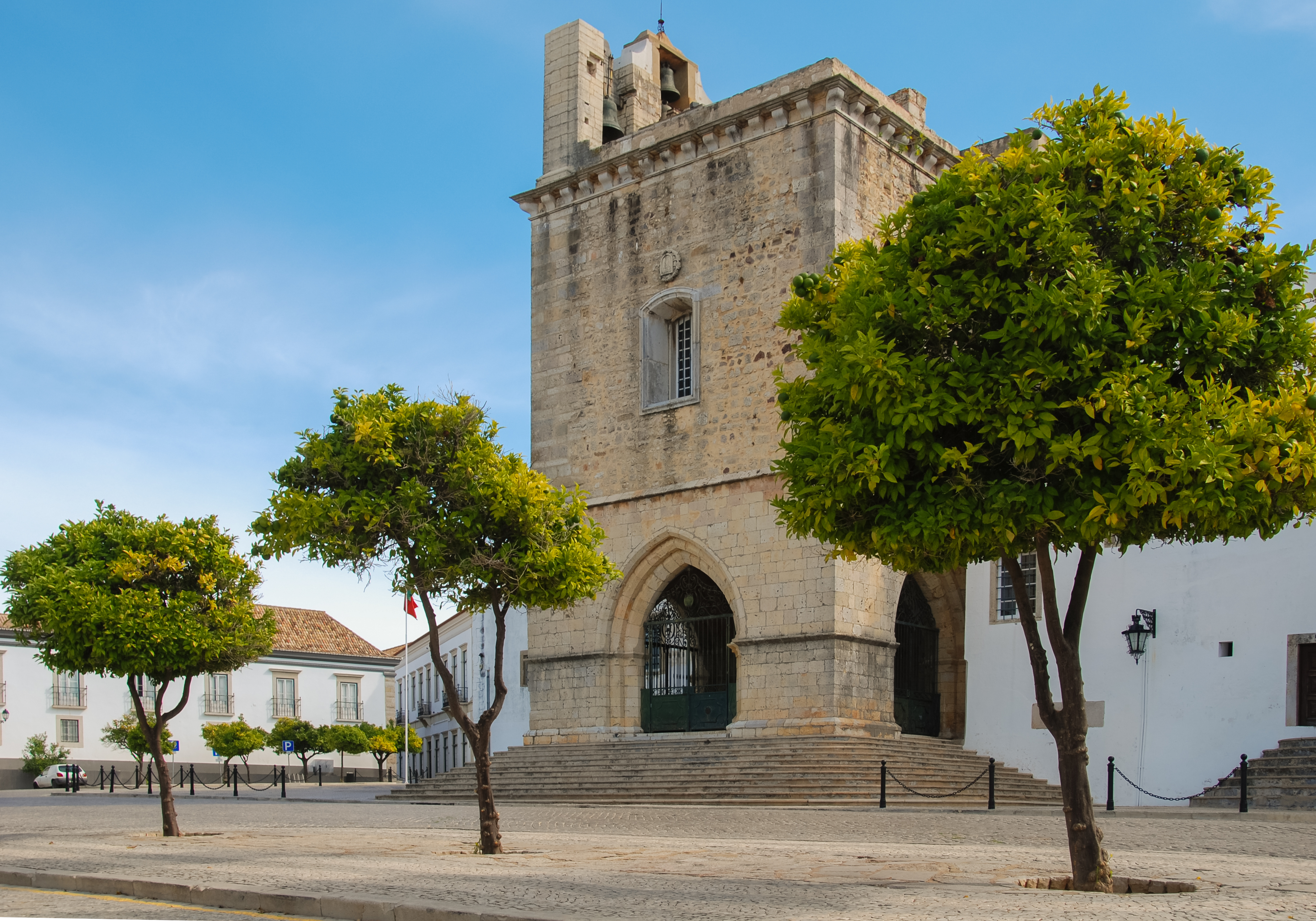
- Faro Cathedral
- Location: Faro
- Country: Portugal

History
- Founded: 13th century

Faro Cathedral (Portuguese: Sé de Faro) is a Roman Catholic cathedral in Faro, Portugal. The cathedral was consecrated in the name of the Blessed Virgin Mary in the late 13th century by the Archbishop of Braga. It has been the seat of the Diocese of Faro since 1540, replacing Silves Cathedral on the orders of King John III of Portugal. In 1596 the church was destroyed by the Earl of Essex. The cathedral is a National Monument of Portugal.

== History ==
The cathedral premises seems to have a long history of sacredness even though archaeological evidences have not been found. According to tradition, an early Paleo-Christian basilica was built here and it was later transformed into a mosque during the Arab Moorish rule. The mosque was finally converted into a Christian church after the Reconquesta of the city by D. Afonso III in 1249. A mother church was rebuilt here soon after. The origins of the present cathedral are identified to the middle of the 13th century. Johann Heinrich Hulenkampf installed the church's organ in the 18th century.

== Description ==
The cathedral features a bell tower and outdoor ossuary in the form of an altar. The bone altar is similar to the one found at the nearby Church of Nossa Senhora, Faro. The cathedral is a mix of several styles such as gothic, baroque, and Portuguese Plain Style architecture.

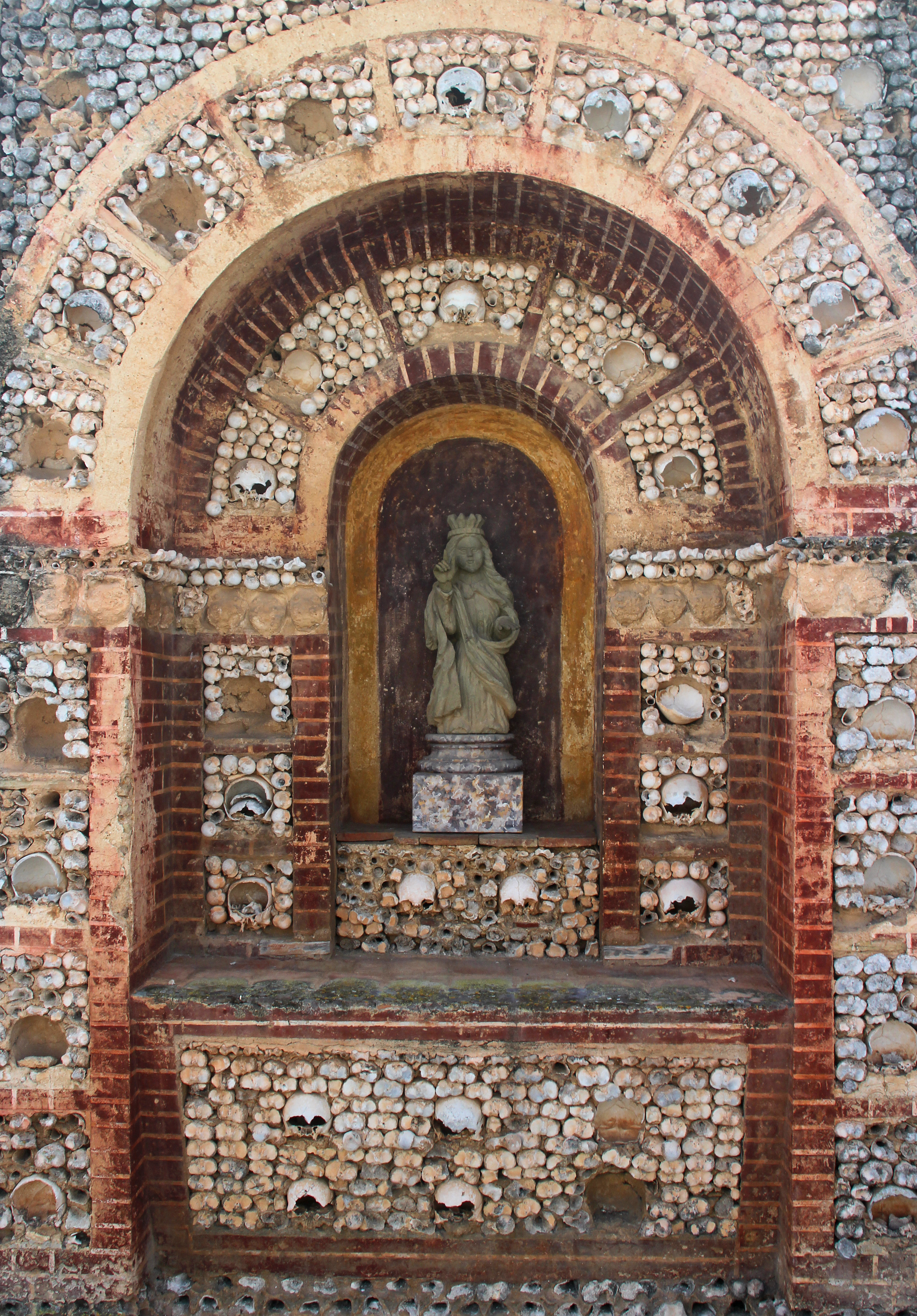
Bone altar

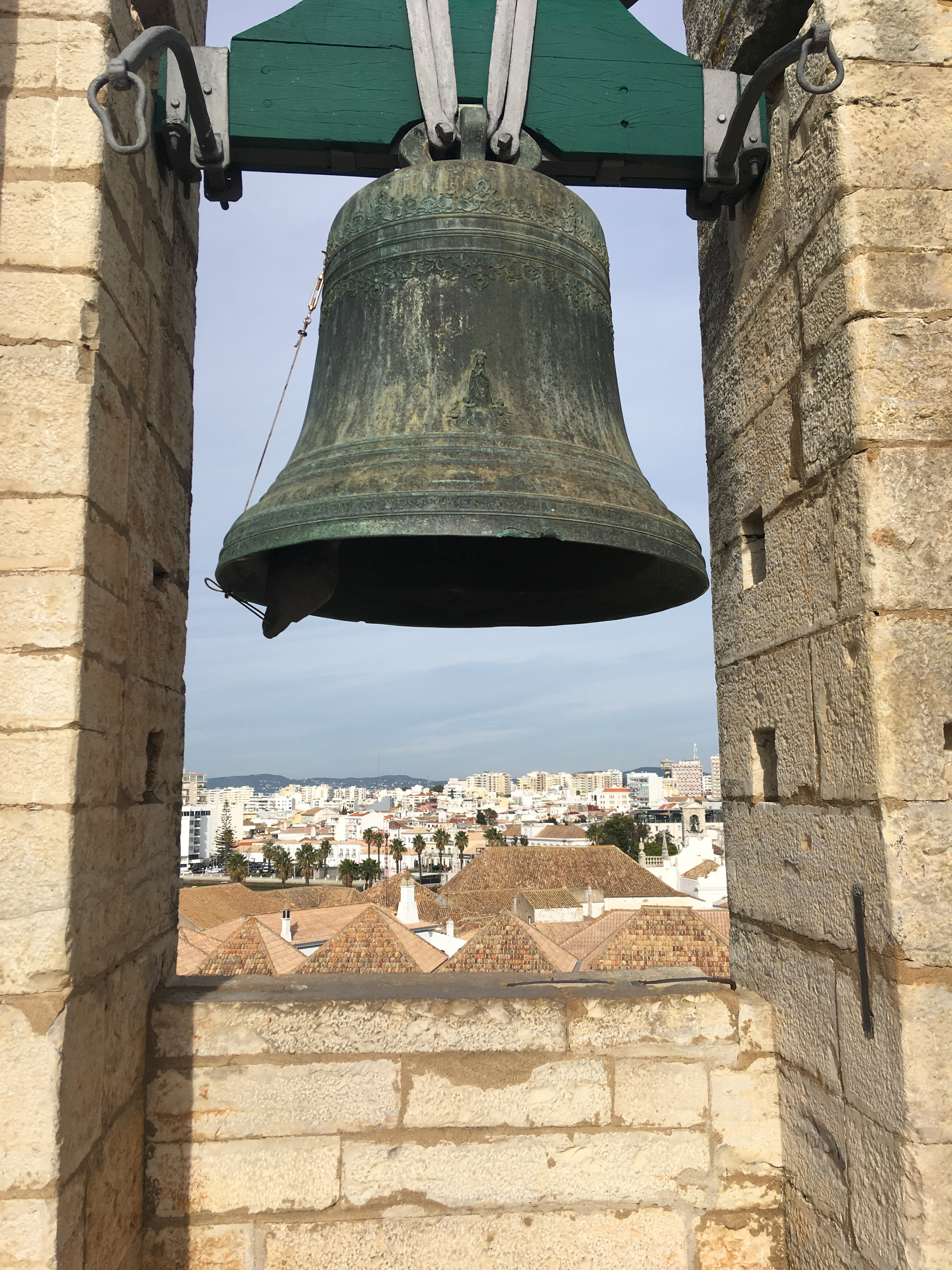
Bell tower

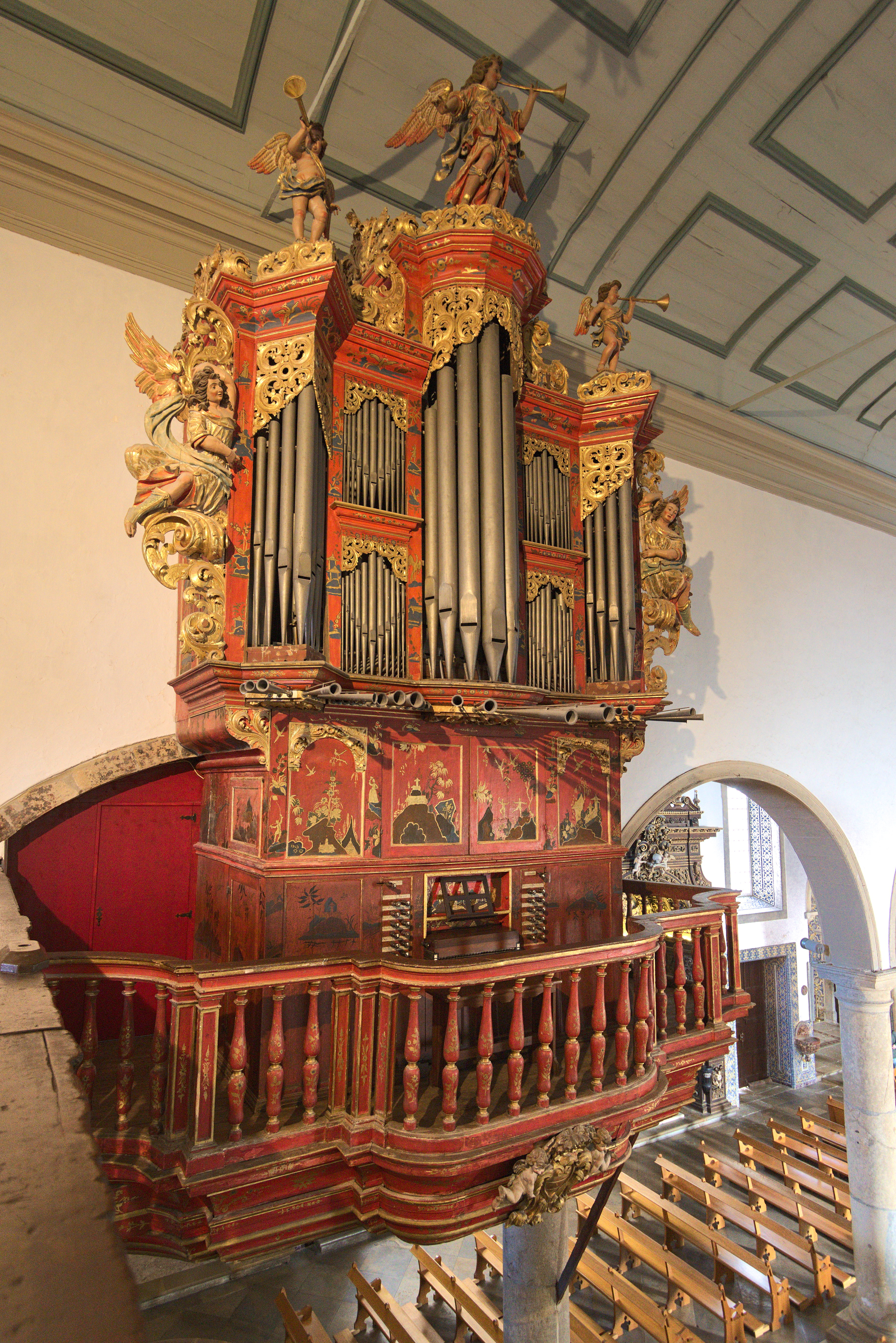
18th century organ

== See also ==
- List of cathedrals in Portugal
