= Sé de Portalegre =

Church building in Portalegre, Portugal

Coordinates: 39°17′28.09″N 7°26′01.51″W

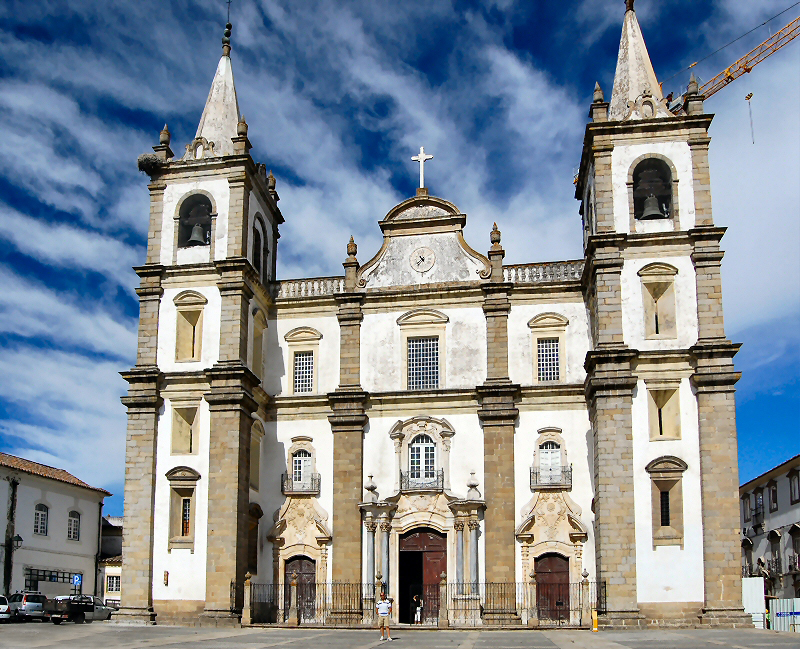
Sé de Portalegre.

The Sé de Portalegre, also known as the Cathedral of Portalegre (Portuguese: Catedral de Portalegre) is a cathedral in Portalegre, Portugal. It is classified as a national monument. Construction started in 1556 and ended in the early 17th century.
