= Manuel Clemente =

Portuguese Catholic prelate (born 1948)

His Eminence Dom Manuel III GCC
- Cardinal; Metropolitan Patriarch Emeritus of Lisbon
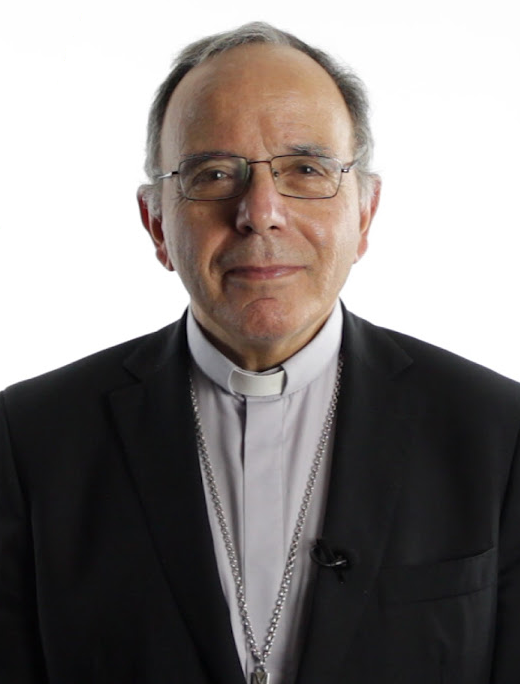
- Church: Latin Church
- Diocese: Lisbon
- See: Lisbon
- Appointed: 18 May 2013
- Installed: 6 July 2013
- Term ended: 10 August 2023
- Predecessor: José IV
- Successor: Rui I
- Other post: Cardinal-Priest of Sant’Antonio in Campo Marzio (2015–)
- Previous posts: Auxiliary Bishop of Lisbon (1999–2007); Roman Catholic Bishop of Porto (2007–2013)

Orders
- Ordination: 29 June 1979 by António Ribeiro
- Consecration: 22 January 2000 by: José IV, Patriarch of Lisbon; Manuel Falcão; Albino Mamede Cleto
- Created cardinal: 14 February 2015 by Pope Francis
- Rank: Metropolitan Patriarch

Personal details
- Born: Manuel José Macário do Nascimento Clemente; 16 July 1948 (age 78) Torres Vedras, Portugal
- Denomination: Roman Catholic
- Education: University of Lisbon
- Motto: In Lumine Tuo (In Thy Light)
- Coat of arms: Manuel III's coat of arms

Styles of Manuel José Macário do Nascimento Clemente
- Reference style: His Eminence
- Spoken style: Your Eminence
- Informal style: Cardinal
- See: Lisbon

Ordination history of Manuel Clemente
History
Episcopal consecration
- Principal consecrator: Jose da Cruz Policarpo
- Co-consecrators: Manuel Franco da Costa de Oliveira Falcao; Albino Mamede Cleto
Cardinalate
- Elevated by: Pope Francis
Episcopal succession
Bishops consecrated by Manuel Clemente as principal consecrator
- José Augusto Traquina Maria: 1 June 2014
- José João dos Santos Marcos: 23 November 2014
- José Ornelas Carvalho, SCI: 25 October 2015
- Daniel Batalha Henriques: 25 November 2018
- Rui Manuel Sousa Valério, SMM: 25 November 2018
- Américo Manuel Alves Aguiar: 31 March 2019

Manuel José Macário do Nascimento Clemente, GCC (Portuguese pronunciation: [mɐnuˈɛl ʒuˈzɛ mɐˈkaɾju ðu nɐʃsiˈmẽtu klɨˈmẽtɨ]; born 16 July 1948), officially Manuel III, is a Portuguese prelate of the Catholic Church. He was the Metropolitan Patriarch of Lisbon from 2013 to 2023 and a cardinal since 14 February 2015. He has been a bishop since 1999 and was Bishop of Porto from 2007 to 2013.

== Biography and education ==
Manuel was born on 16 July 1948 at Torres Vedras, Portugal, to Francisco de Nascimento Clemente and Maria Sofia Correia Lopes Macário. He entered the Major Seminary of Christ the King of the Groves in 1973 and graduated from the University of Lisbon a year later with a degree in history. He also received a degree in theology in 1979 at the Catholic University of Portugal where he taught Church History beginning in 1975. He also received a Doctorate in Historical Theology with his thesis titled "On the origins of contemporary apostolate in Portugal: The "Catholic Society" (1843–1853)".

== Priest ==
Manuel was ordained a priest on 29 June 1979 by Patriarch of Lisbon, António Ribeiro at the age of 31. From then on, he attained several positions. He became the director of Center for the Study of Religious History from 2000-2007. He became the member of the Scientific Society of the Catholic University since 1993 and became Associate Academic Correspondent of the Portuguese Academy of History from 1996. Manuel also became the head of the Foundation for Science and Technology's projects: Church and social movements: Catholic organizations in Portugal in the twentieth century (1993–1995) and The Catholic movement and the presence Church in Portuguese society (1996–1998).

When Manuel was ordained, he was assigned as parochial vicar of Runa in Torres Vedras. In 1989 he was appointed canon of the Lisbon Cathedral and the vice-rector of the Major Seminary of Christ the King Of The Groves until 1997, when he was appointed as president. He was the Coordinator of the Patriarchate in 1996 and coordinator of the Preparatory Commission of the Presbytery Assembly for Jubilee 2000. He is the author of a vast work of historiography, especially titles like Portugal and the Portuguese and a single purpose published in 2009 and Portuguese Church and Society, the Republic of Liberalism.

== Bishop ==
=== Auxiliary Bishop of Lisbon ===
He was appointed auxiliary bishop of Lisbon with the title of Titular Bishop of Pinhel on 6 November 1999 by Pope John Paul II. His episcopal consecration took place on 22 January 2000 in the Church of the Jeronimos Monastery with Patriarch José Policarpo as principal consecrator with Bishops Manuel Franco da Costa de Oliveira Falcão and Albino Mamede Cleto as co-consecrators. At his consecration he chose his current episcopal motto: In Lumine tuo (In Your Light) .

He was named Promoter of Pastoral Culture in the Portuguese Episcopal Conference in 2002 and he was also the president of the Episcopal Commission of Culture, Cultural and Communications from 2005 to 2011. He is a recognized figure in Portuguese culture and contributes to the Cultural Ministry in Portugal. Manuel is an excellent communicator and is highly respected by the intellectual circles inside and outside the Church. For many years, he has worked regularly and collaborated with various media outlets.

=== Bishop of Porto ===
Manuel was appointed bishop of Porto on 22 February 2007 by Pope Benedict XVI, succeeding Armindo Lopes Coelho. He was installed on 25 March. In 2008 he was the first Portuguese bishop to convey the Christmas Address through YouTube. In 2011 he was elected vice-president of the Portuguese Episcopal Conference and was appointed to the Pontifical Council for Social Communications.

== Metropolitan Patriarch of Lisbon ==
Manuel was appointed Metropolitan Patriarch of Lisbon on 18 May 2013 when Pope Francis accepted the resignation of José Policarpo. He was enthroned on 6 July 2013 at the Lisbon Cathedral and made his solemn entry to the Jerónimos Monastery the following day. In a farewell statement to the diocese of Porto, Manuel makes sure that "the heart has no distance, only depth plus". Manuel received the pallium in a ceremony at St. Peter's Basilica on 29 June.

The Portuguese Episcopal Conference elected him president in 2013 and re-elected him to a three-year term in 2014. Manuel is the Grand Prior of the Portugal Lieutenancy of the Equestrian Order of the Holy Sepulchre of Jerusalem.

== Cardinal ==
Pope Clement XII, by the Bull Inter praecipuas apostolici ministerii dated 17 February 1737, established that the person appointed Patriarch of Lisbon would be made a cardinal in the following consistory. Pope Francis disregarded this and did not make Manuel a cardinal in 2014, instead waiting until 14 February 2015—the second consistory following his appointment as patriarch.

On 4 January 2015, Pope Francis announced that he would make him a cardinal on 14 February. At that ceremony, he was assigned the titular church of Sant'Antonio in Campo Marzio.

On 13 April 2015 he was appointed a member of the Congregation for the Clergy and the Pontifical Council for Social Communications.

Pope Francis accepted his resignation as patriarch on 10 August 2023.

He participated as a cardinal elector in the 2025 papal conclave that elected Pope Leo XIV.

== Publications ==
- Clemente, Manuel (2012). Portuguese Society Church of Liberalism and the Republic. Lisbon: Assyrian & Alvim. ISBN 978-972-37-1610-8.
- Clemente, Manuel (2011). It's This Time: Experience Mission. Lisbon: Cornerstone. ISBN 978-989-97-1194-5.
- Clemente, Manuel (2010). Dialogue Time Debris - A Conversation about Portugal, the World and the Catholic Church. Lisbon: Moonstone. ISBN 978-989-81-4230-6.
- Clemente, Manuel (2008). 1810 - 1910 - 2010; dates and Challenges. Lisbon: Assyrian & Alvim. ISBN 978-972-37-1407-4.
- Clemente, Manuel (2009). A Purpose Only. Homilies and Pastoral Writings. Cornerstone. ISBN 978-989-96145-0-5.
- Clemente, Manuel (2008). Portugal and the Portuguese. Lisbon: Assyrian & Alvim. ISBN 978-972-37-1322-0. Archived from the original on 13 February 2015.
- Clemente, Manuel (2007). Popes century. XX. Lisbon: Paulus. ISBN 978-972-30-1061-9.
- Clemente, Manuel (2010). A church on time : Brief history of the Catholic Church. Lisbon: Griffin. ISBN 978-972-81-7836-9.

== Honours ==
=== Portuguese ===
- Grand-Cross of the Order of Christ, Portugal (30 August 2010)

==== Municipal ====
- Medal of Honor, Marco de Canaveses (15 October 2010)
- Medal of Honor, Valongo (14 January 2011)
- Medal of Honor and Citizen of Porto, Porto (25 April 2011)
- Gold Medal of Honor, Gondomar (27 January 2012)
- Key of Honor, Melres (24 February 2012)
- Medal of Honor and Honorary Citizen, Vila Nova de Gaia (24 April 2013)

==== Academic ====
- Doctor Honoris Causa in Political Science and International Relations Citizenship by the Lusophone University of Porto, 18 May 2012

==== Others ====
- 2009 Pessoa Prize for being "an ethical reference for Portuguese society as a whole"

=== Foreign ===
- Grand-Cross of the Order pro merito Melitensi (12 December 2012)

== See also ==
- Cardinals created by Pope Francis

Catholic Church titles
Preceded by Hugo Mark Gerbermann	— TITULAR — Titular Bishop of Pinhel; 6 November 1999 – 22 July 2007	Succeeded by Guillermo Martín Abanto Guzmán
Preceded by Armindo Lopes Coelho	Bishop of Porto; 22 February 2007 – 18 May 2013	Succeeded by António Francisco dos Santos
Preceded by José da Cruz Policarpo	Patriarch of Lisbon; 2013 – 2023	Succeeded by Rui Valério
Preceded by José da Cruz Policarpo	President of the Portuguese Episcopal Conference; 2013 – 2020	Succeeded by José Ornelas Carvalho
Preceded by José da Cruz Policarpo	Cardinal-Priest of Sant'Antonio in Campo Marzio; 2015 –	Incumbent
