= Our Lady of Grace Cathedral, Setúbal =

Coordinates: 38.5244°N 8.8883°W

Our Lady of Grace Cathedral
- Sé Catedral de Santa Maria da Graça
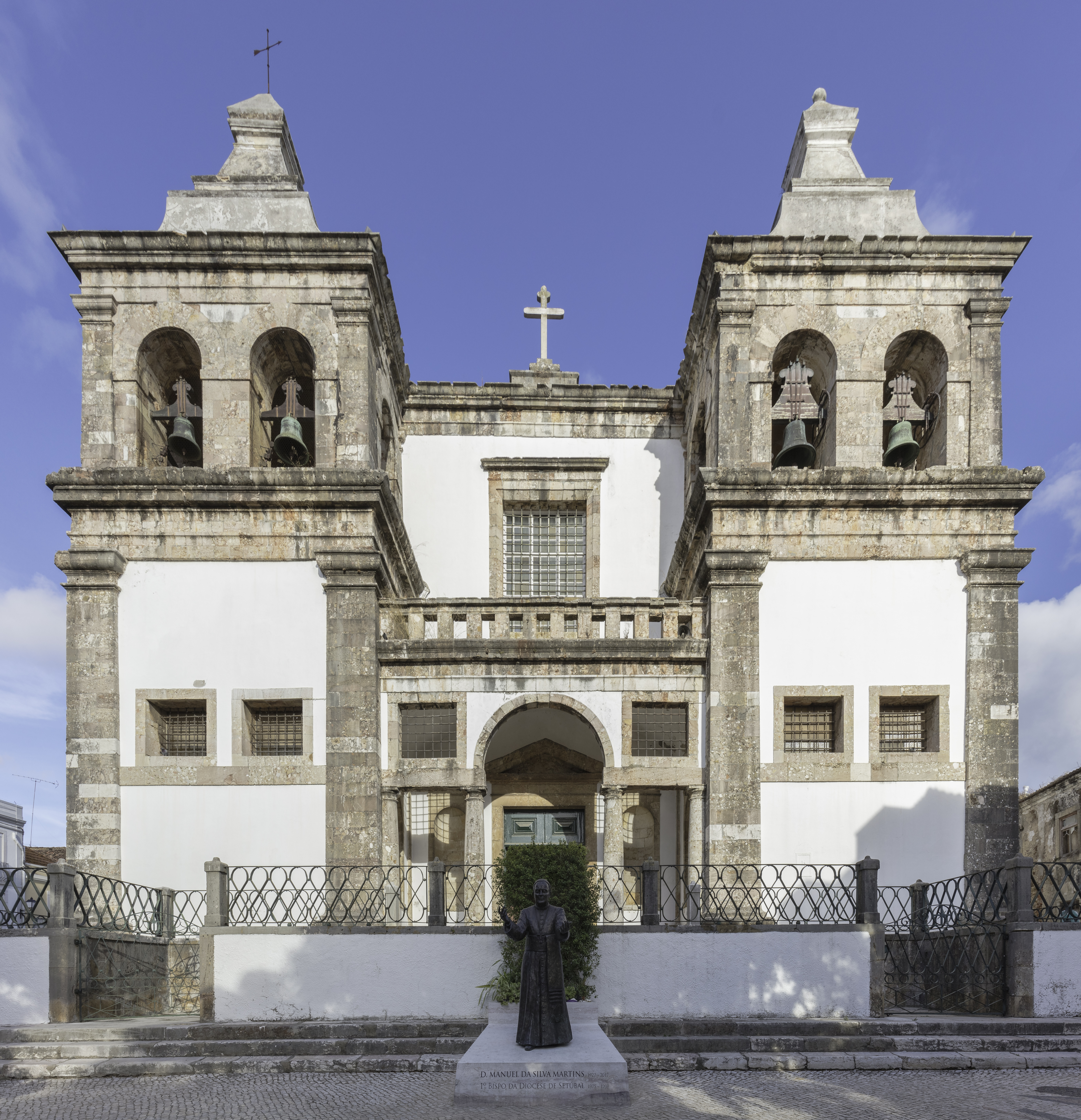
- Our Lady of Grace Cathedral
- Location: Setúbal
- Country: Portugal
- Denomination: Roman Catholic Church

The Our Lady of Grace Cathedral (Portuguese: Sé Catedral de Santa Maria da Graça) also called Setúbal Cathedral is the name given to a religious building affiliated with the Catholic Church that works as the Cathedral of Setúbal, a city in Portugal. It is located in the heart of the primitive medieval town of Setúbal, around which the most important medieval district of the city as well as the religious and administrative center developed.

Founded in the thirteenth century, the current building is a reconstruction of the High Renaissance with a Mannerist facade. Inside are frescoed columns and tiles of the seventeenth and eighteenth centuries.

On a side street is the Gothic porch of an old house, the Hospital João Palmeiro.

== Gallery ==
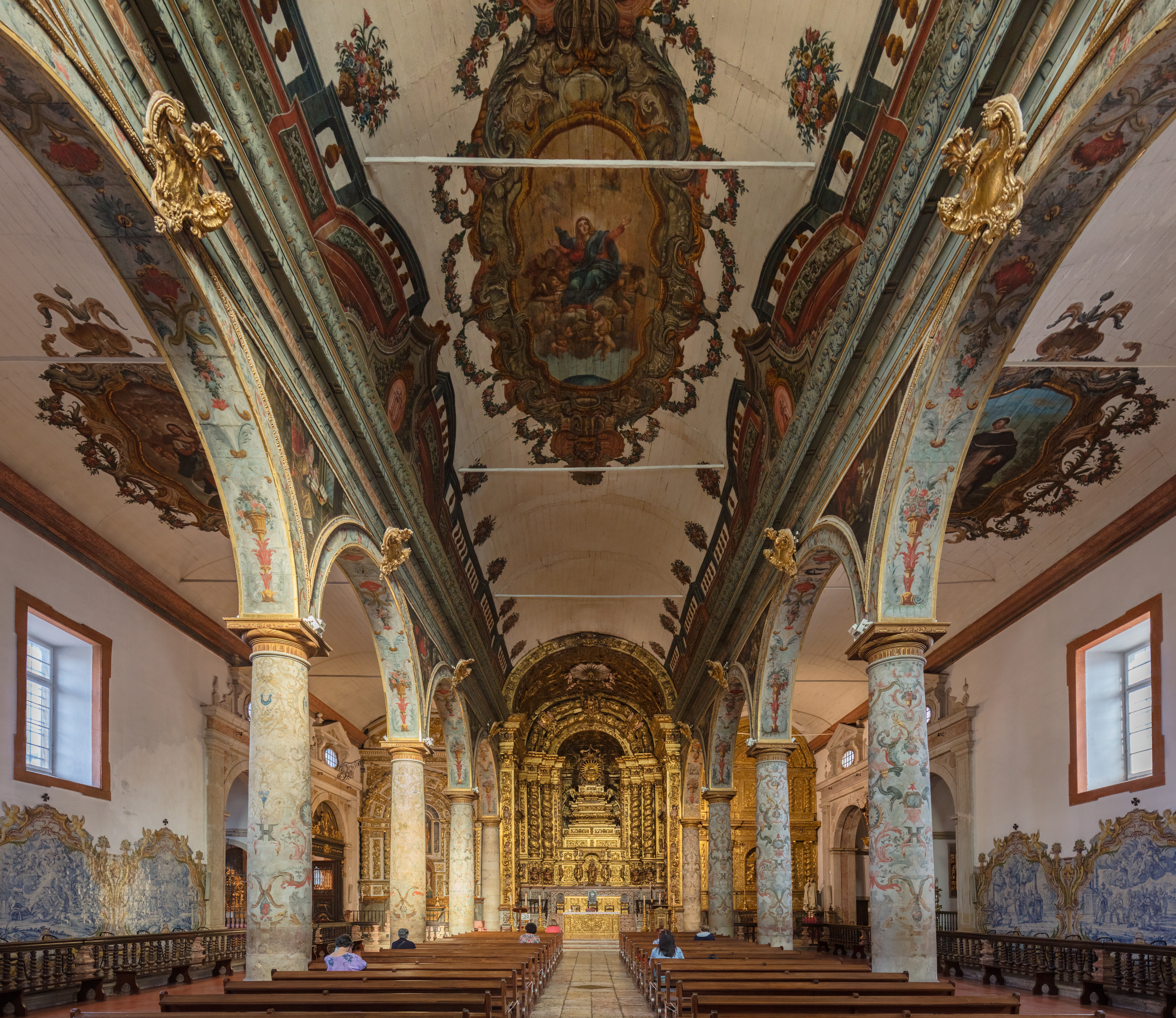
Interior view

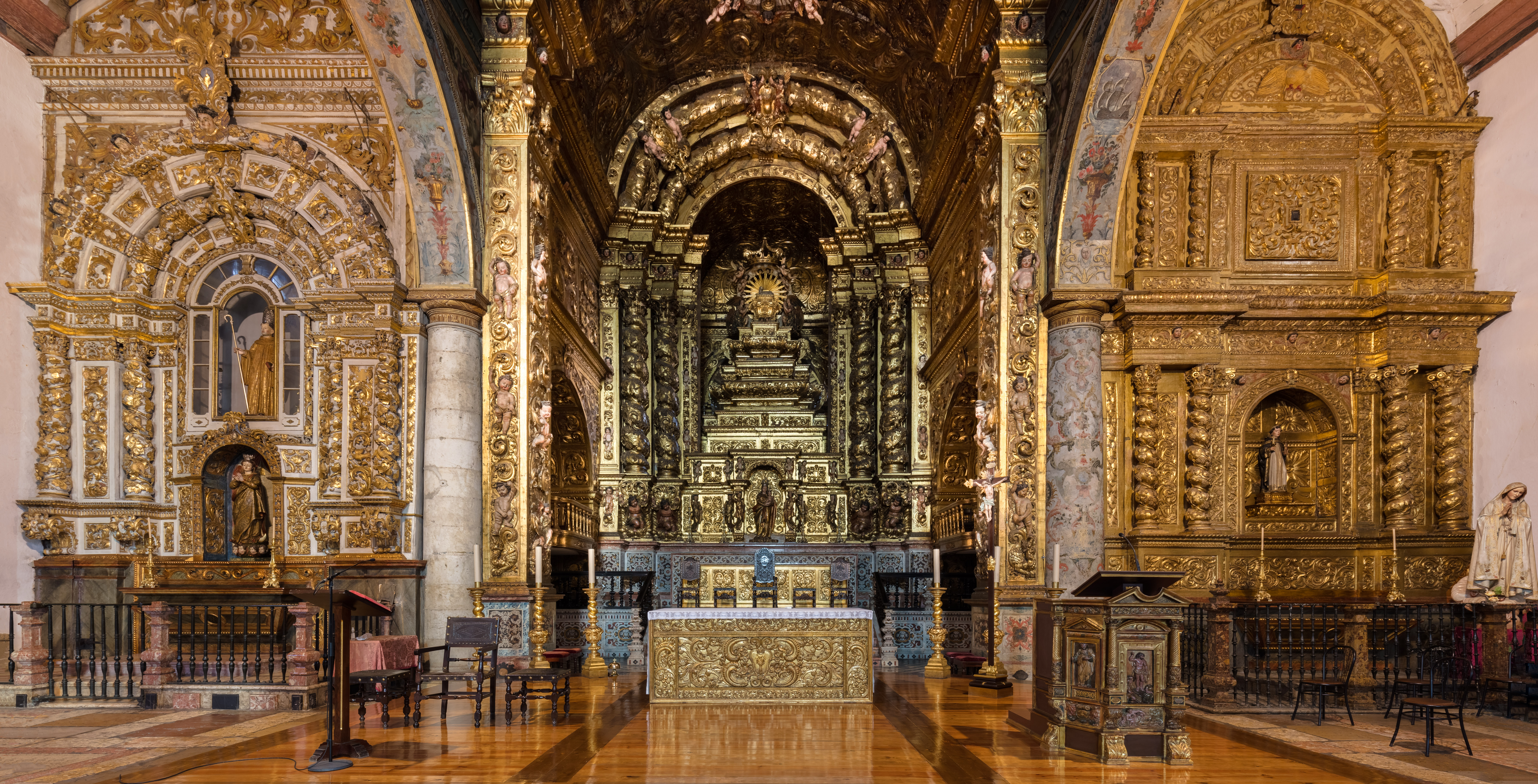
Altar, with by side chapels of Our Lady of the Conception on the left and of St. Peter González on the right

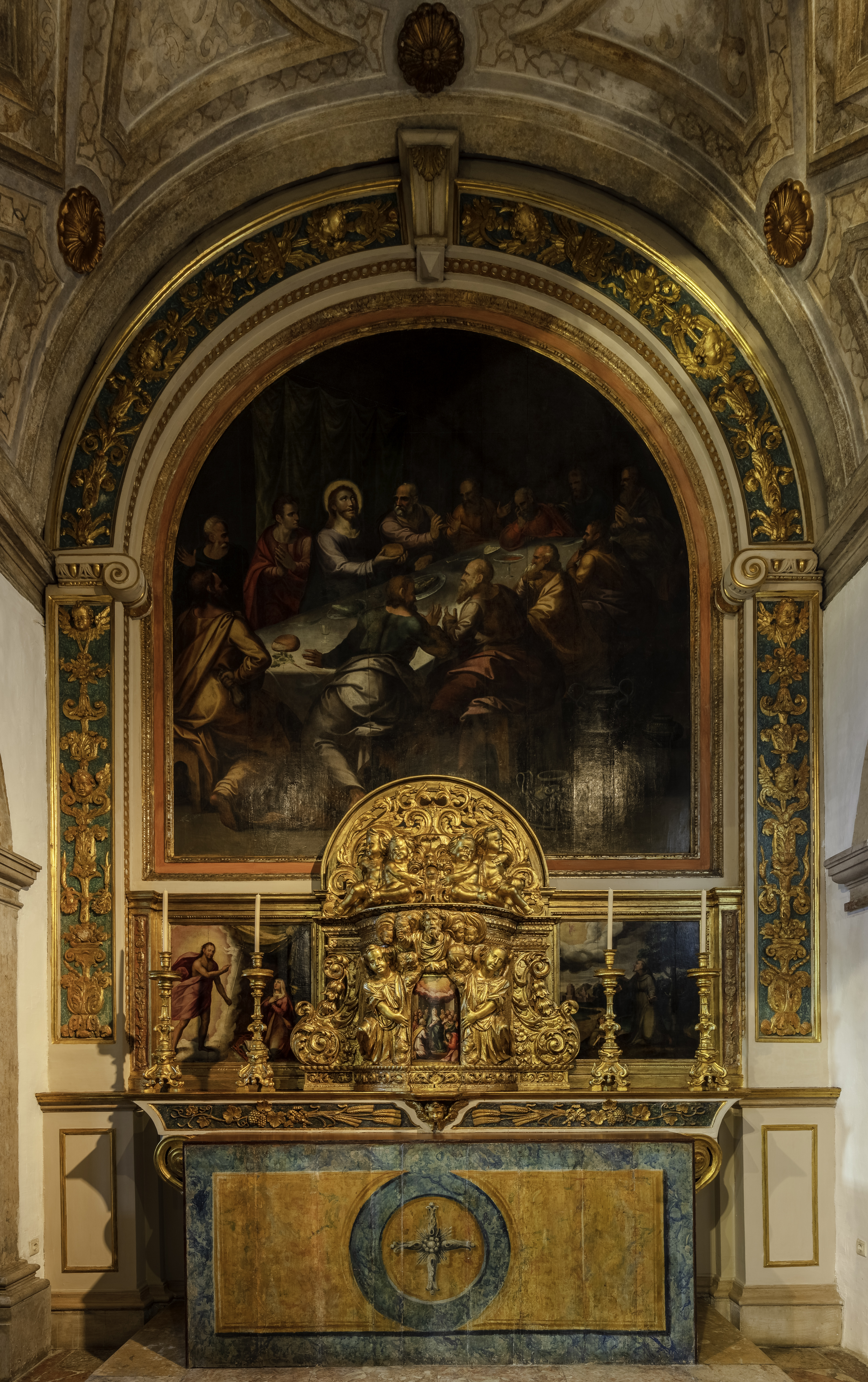
Side chapel dedicated to the Blessed Sacrament

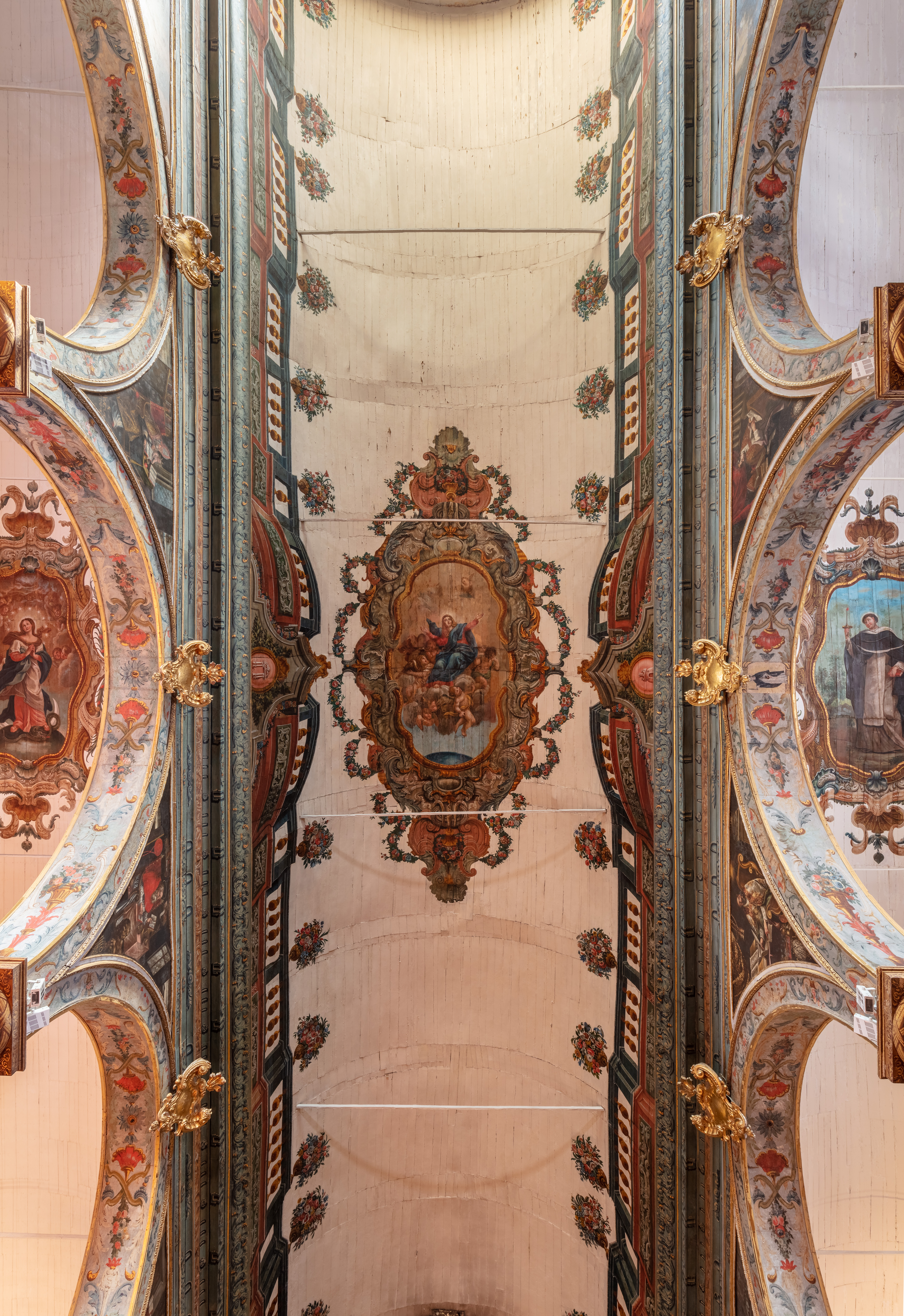
Ceiling

== See also ==
- Roman Catholicism in Portugal
- Our Lady of Grace Cathedral
