= Catholic Church in Portugal =

- Portuguese: Igreja Católica em Portugal
- Cathedral of Saint Mary Major, the seat of the Cardinal-Patriarch of Lisbon
- Type: National polity
- Classification: Catholic
- Orientation: Latin
- Scripture: Bible
- Theology: Catholic theology
- Governance: Episcopal Conference of Portugal
- Pope: Leo XIV
- Primate: José Manuel Garcia Cordeiro
- Patriarch of Lisbon: D. Rui Valério
- Apostolic Nuncio: Andrés Carrascosa Coso
- Region: Portugal
- Language: Portuguese, Latin
- Headquarters: Lisbon Cathedral
- Founder: St. Peter of Rates
- Origin: 44 A.D. Lusitania, Roman Empire
- Separations: Protestantism in Portugal (16th century)
- Official website: Episcopal Conference of Portugal

The Portuguese Catholic Church, or Catholic Church in Portugal, is part of the worldwide Catholic Church in communion with the Pope in Rome, under the Portuguese Episcopal Conference. The Catholic Church is the world's largest Christian organisation. It is Portugal's largest religion and its former state religion, and has existed in the territory since the Iberian Peninsula was ruled by the Roman Empire.

There are an estimated nine million baptised Catholics in Portugal (84% of the population) in twenty dioceses, served by 2789 priests. Although a large number wish to be baptized, married in the church, and receive last rites, only 19% of the national population attend Mass and take the sacraments regularly.

In 2010, the average age of priests was 62. In 2012 88% of the Portuguese population considered themselves Catholic in a commissioned survey of religious attitudes sponsored by a Christian organization.

== History ==
Western Christianity was introduced to the province of Lusitania, what is now Portugal under the Roman Empire in the first half of the first millennium AD. The present-day Portuguese state was founded in 1139 by King Afonso Henriques during the Reconquista, in which the Christian kingdoms of the northern Iberian Peninsula reconquered the South from the Cordoba Caliphate of the Sunni Muslim Moors. Crusaders from other Catholic realms aided the reconquest, which Portugal finished in 1249 with the conquest of Algarve.

After the Fall of Constantinople to the Ottoman Empire, Portuguese discoveries in the Age of Exploration, would lead to the establishment of the Portuguese Empire from the early 15th century onwards, spreading Catholicism to Portuguese colonies in Ceuta on the Barbary coast of North Africa, Sub-Saharan Africa, the East Indies in Asia, and South America. The Lusophone countries of Angola, Brazil, Cape Verde, Mozambique, São Tomé and Príncipe, and Timor-Leste all have Catholic majorities as a result. The Primate of the East Indies based in the Portuguese Goa of early-modern India was part of the Portuguese Empire in the East, and a significant Latin Christian minority remains in the Indian subcontinent, the most prominent of which are Goan Catholics. Bombay East Indian Christians, Mangalorean Christians and Latin Christians of Malabar are also among the lesser-known New Christian converts in the Eastern hemisphere.

The church supported the Miguelist faction during the Liberal Wars of 1828-1834.

In 1910, the Portuguese Republic abolished the policy of having the Latin Church as the state religion, in favour of secularism. However, the right-wing Salazar regime from 1932 to 1974 re-established Catholicism as the state religion, which had repercussions such as the Annexation of Goa and Damaon, after which the system was subsequently disestablished along with the regime.

In 2021 the Portuguese Catholic Bishops' Conference established an independent committee for the investigation of any sexual abuse within the Portuguese church, the Independent Commission for the Study of Sexual Abuse of Children in the Catholic Church in Portugal began its work in January 2022 and issued its final report in February 2023. The commission, led by child psychologist Pedro Strecht, received 564 testimonies, of which it held 512 to be verified, relating to incidents of abuse which occurred between 1950 and the commission's establishment in 2021. From these testimonies the Commission identified that around 77% of alleged perpetrators were priests with 57% of victims as males, most of whom aged between 10 and 14. Commission president Strecht extrapolated that the figure of victims likely stood at around 5000 individuals, and further proposed that as many 100 priests in active ministry as of February 2023 had been credibly accused of abuse. He stated that the commission would submit the names of these priests to the Church and public prosecutor in due course. Following the report's publication, 25 serving priests have been reported to the office of public prosecutions.

The president of the Portuguese Catholic Bishops' Conference, Josè Ornelas, responded to the report's publication with words of apology and confirmed the Portuguese bishops' intention to implement the report's recommendations.

== Organization ==
Map with the Portuguese ecclesiastical districts and Fatima Shrine.

Within Portugal, the hierarchy consists of archbishops and bishops. At the top of the hierarchy is the archbishop who is known as the Patriarch of Lisbon. The remainder of the dioceses of Portugal, each headed by a bishop, includes:

- Lisbon (with the dignity of Patriarchate)
  - Angra
  - Funchal
  - Guarda
  - Leiria-Fátima
  - Portalegre-Castelo Branco
  - Santarém
  - Setúbal
- Braga
  - Aveiro
  - Bragança-Miranda
  - Coimbra
  - Lamego
  - Porto
  - Viana do Castelo
  - Vila Real
  - Viseu
- Évora
  - Beja
  - Faro

== Sites ==
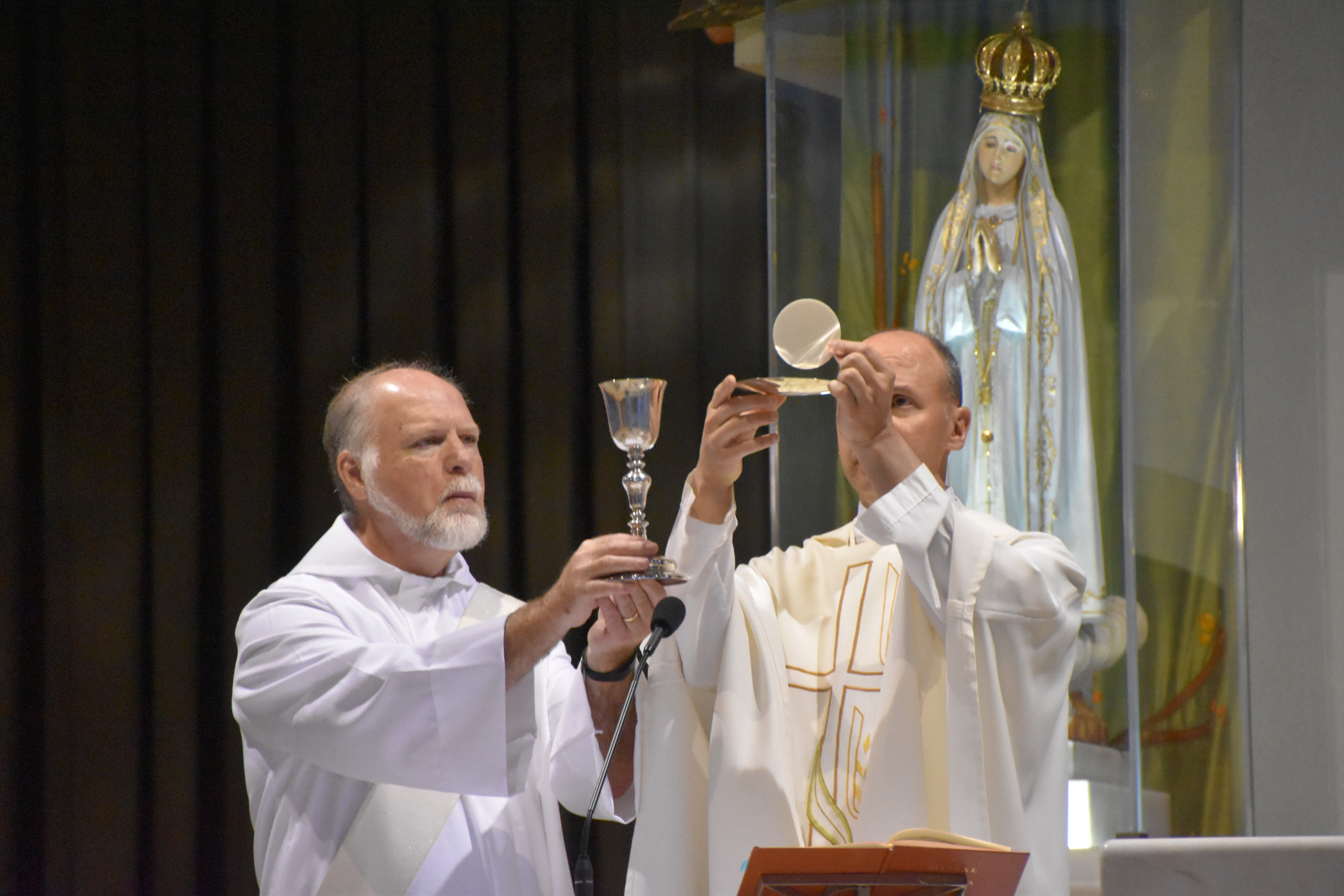
Eucharistic celebration at the world famous Sanctuary of Our Lady of Fátima.

Portugal is the location of one of the major Catholic shrines and Marian pilgrimage sites, at Fátima, honouring Our Lady of Fátima.

The northern city of Braga is an important Catholic centre. A Portuguese saying which lists characteristics of different cities states that "Coimbra studies, Braga prays, Lisbon shows off and Porto works". Besides the Cathedral of Braga, it also has the Sanctuary of Bom Jesus do Monte and the Sanctuary of Our Lady of Sameiro.

One of the routes on the Way of St. James, a major Catholic pilgrimage to the Santiago de Compostela Cathedral in Galicia, Spain, is the Portuguese route (Portuguese: Caminho Português), starting from Lisbon Cathedral and spanning 610 km. Among those who have taken it was Queen Elizabeth of Portugal, who was canonized, in the 14th century.

== Portuguese Popes ==
Two popes were born in what is now Portugal, though only the second one was ever a subject of a country by that name. Damasus I was born in what is now Portugal in 306. His reign as pope from 366 to 384 saw the Scriptures translated to Latin. He is honoured as a saint, with his feast celebrated on December 11.

Pedro Julião, born in Lisbon around 1215, led the church as Pope John XXI from 1276 to 1277.

== Gallery ==
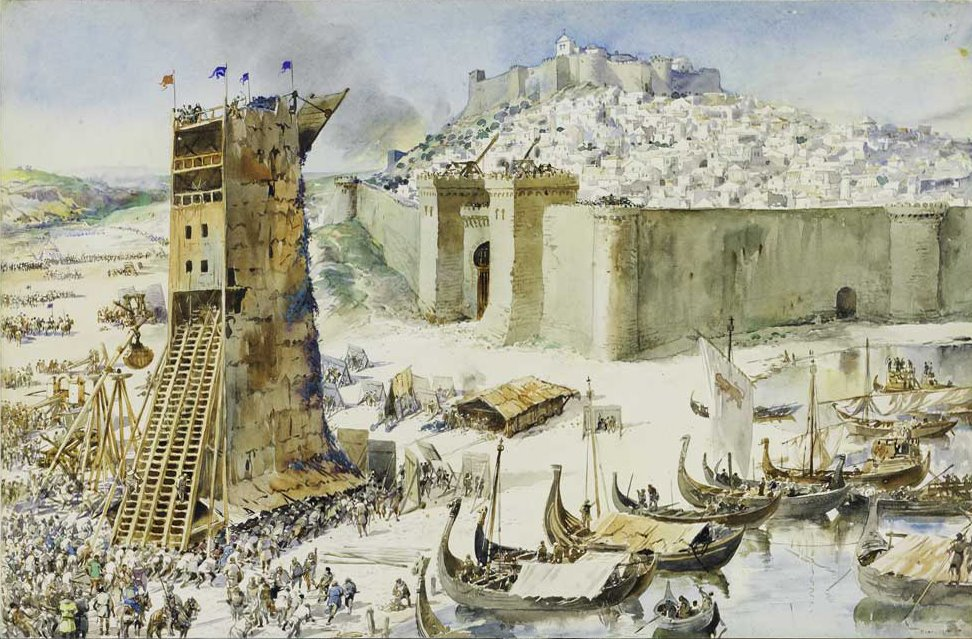
The Siege of Lisbon in 1147, part of the Reconquista (Crusades)

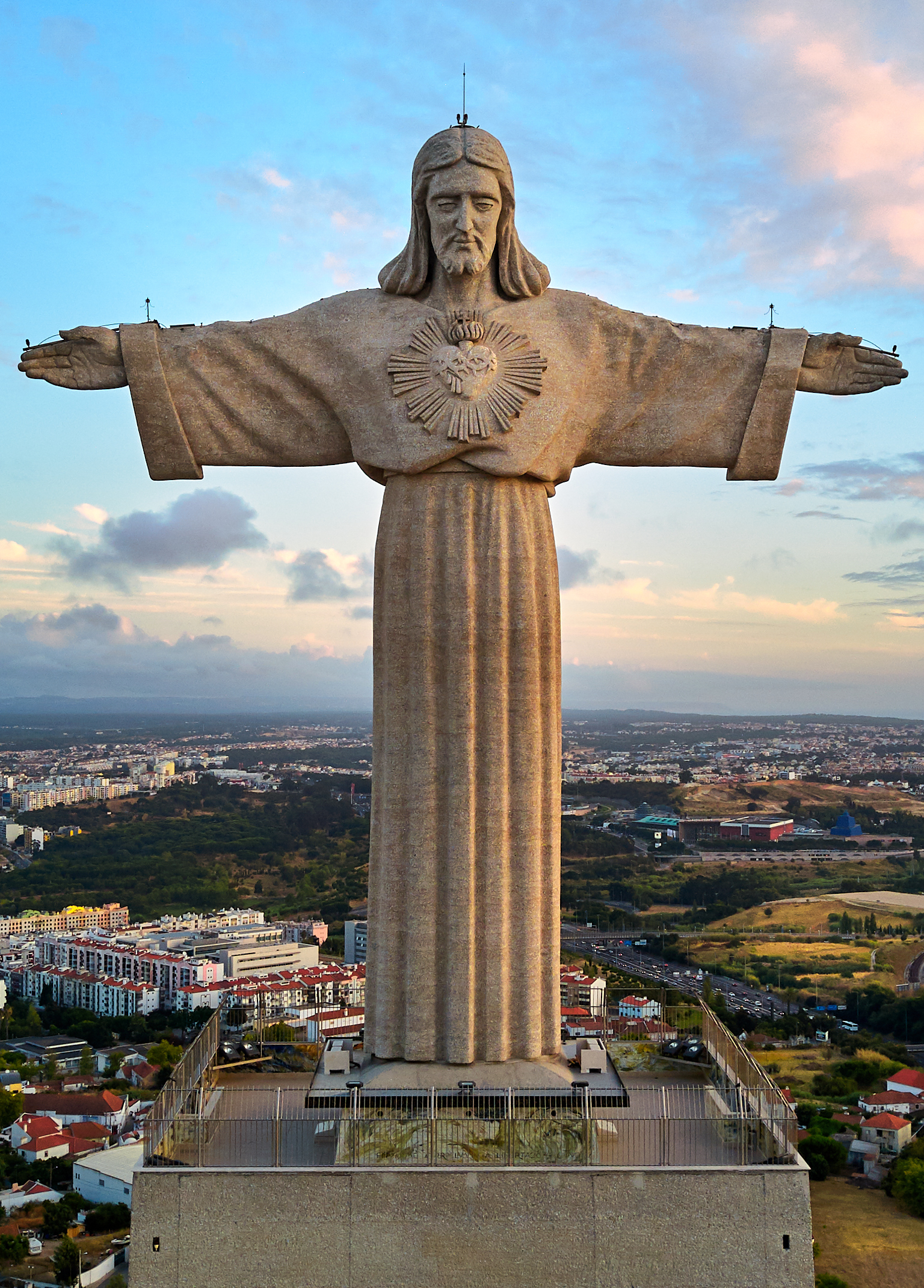
The National Sanctuary of Christ the King

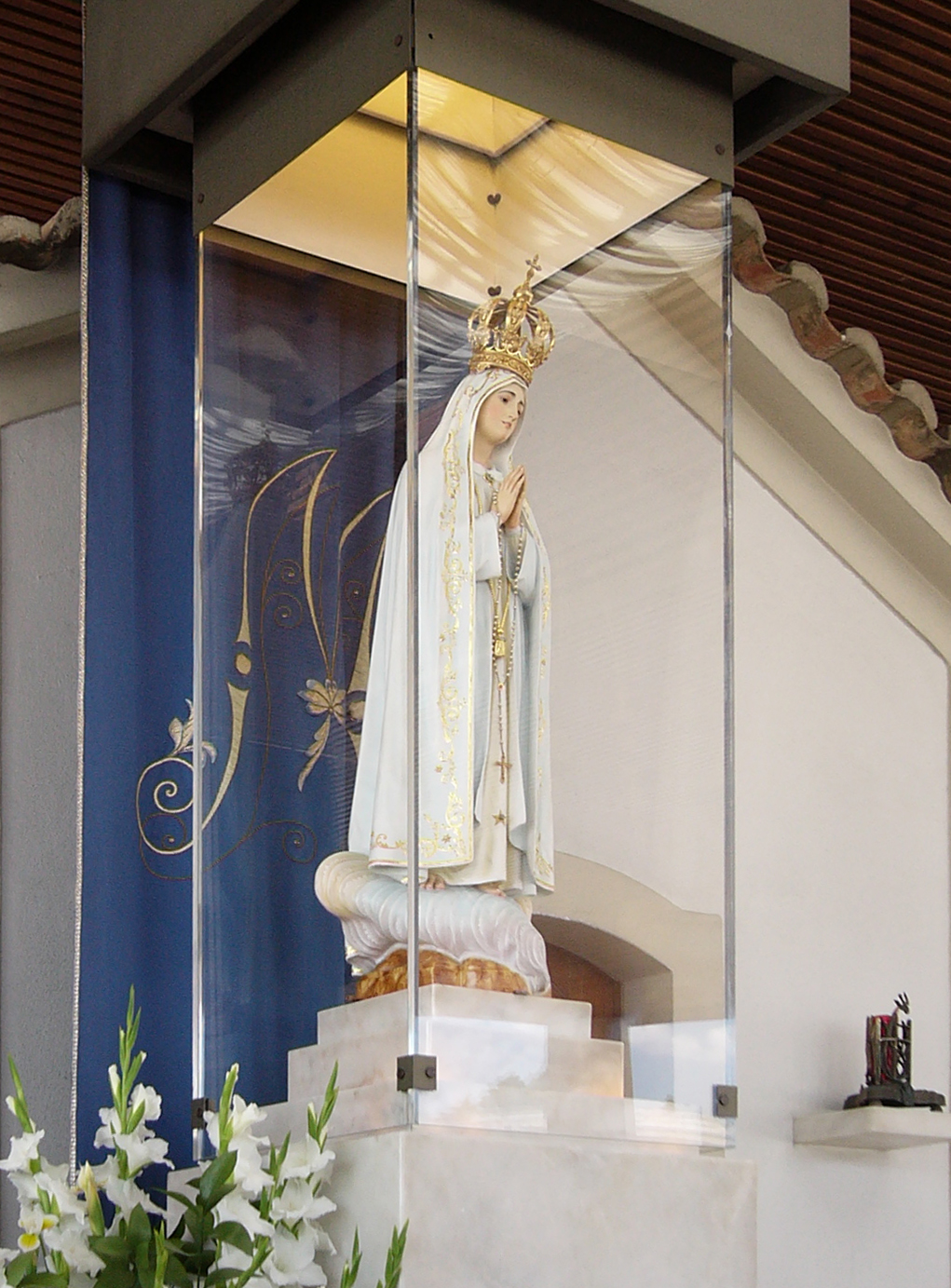
Our Lady of Fátima is the greatest Marian devotion in Portugal

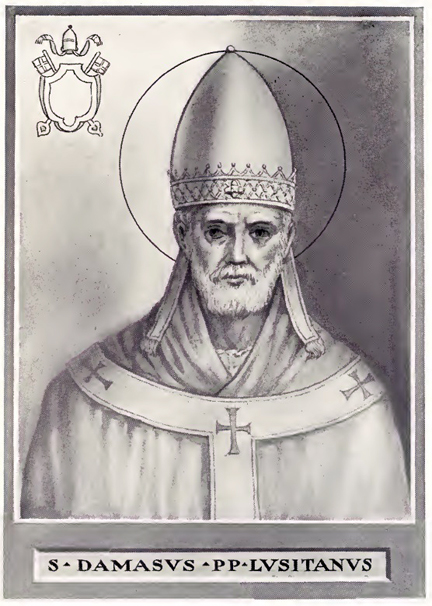
Pope Damasus I was from Roman Lusitania, now Portugal

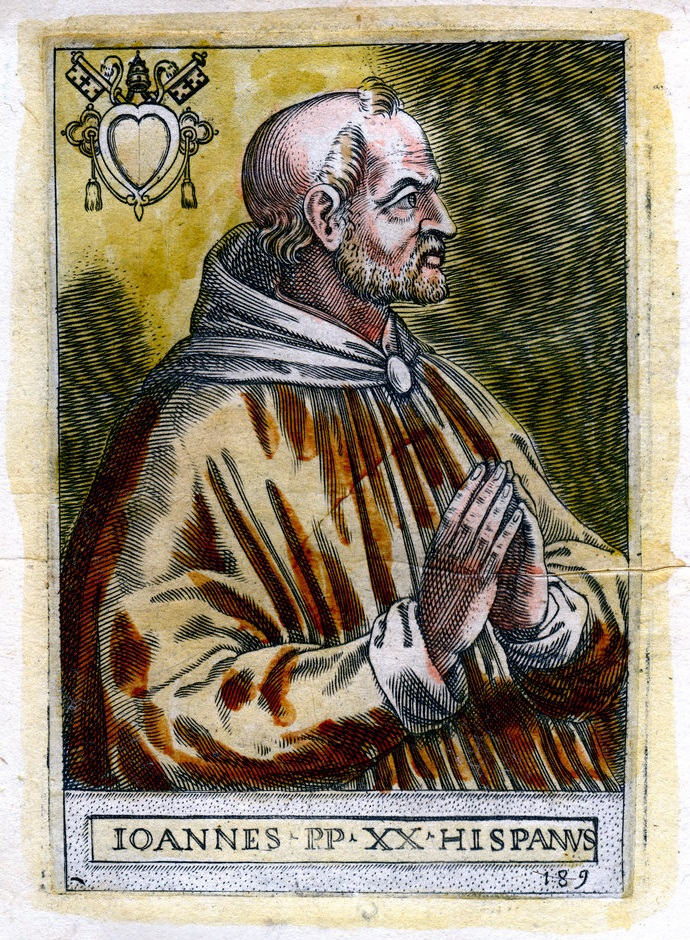
Pope John XXI, born in Lisbon in c. 1215

== See also ==
- Catholic University of Portugal
- Dissolution of the monasteries in Portugal
- Ecclesiastical history of Braga
- List of cathedrals in Portugal
- Portuguese Inquisition
- Religion in Portugal
