= Diocese of Santarém, Portugal =

Roman Catholic diocese in Portugal

Diocese of Santarém Dioecesis Santaremensis in Lusitania Diocese de Santarém

Catholic

Location
- Country: Portugal
- Ecclesiastical province: Lisbon
- Metropolitan: Patriarchate of Lisbon

Statistics
- Area: 3,202 km^{2} (1,236 sq mi)
- Population: Total; Catholics: (as of 2004); 285,000; 250,000 (87.7%)

Information
- Denomination: Roman Catholic
- Sui iuris church: Latin Church
- Rite: Roman Rite
- Established: 16 July 1975
- Cathedral: Cathedral of Our Lady of the Assumption in Santarém
- Patron saint: Immaculate Conception

Current leadership
- Pope: Leo XIV
- Bishop: José Augusto Traquina Maria
- Metropolitan Archbishop: Manuel III

Map
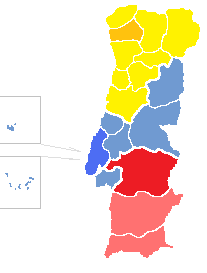

Website
- Website of the Diocese

The Diocese of Santarém (Latin: Dioecesis Santaremensis in Lusitania) is a Latin Church ecclesiastical territory or diocese of the Catholic Church in Portugal, erected on 16 July 1975 by Pope Paul VI. It is a suffragan of the ecclesiastical province of the metropolitan Patriarchate of Lisbon. Its episcopal see at Santarém is north-east of Lisbon.

The current bishop is José Augusto Traquina Maria, appointed in 2017.

== Ordinaries ==
- António Francisco Marques, O.F.M. † (16 Jul 1975 Appointed - 28 Aug 1997 Died)
- Manuel Pelino Domingues (27 Jan 1998 Appointed - 7 Oct 2017 Retired)
- José Augusto Traquina Maria (7 Oct 2017 Appointed - )

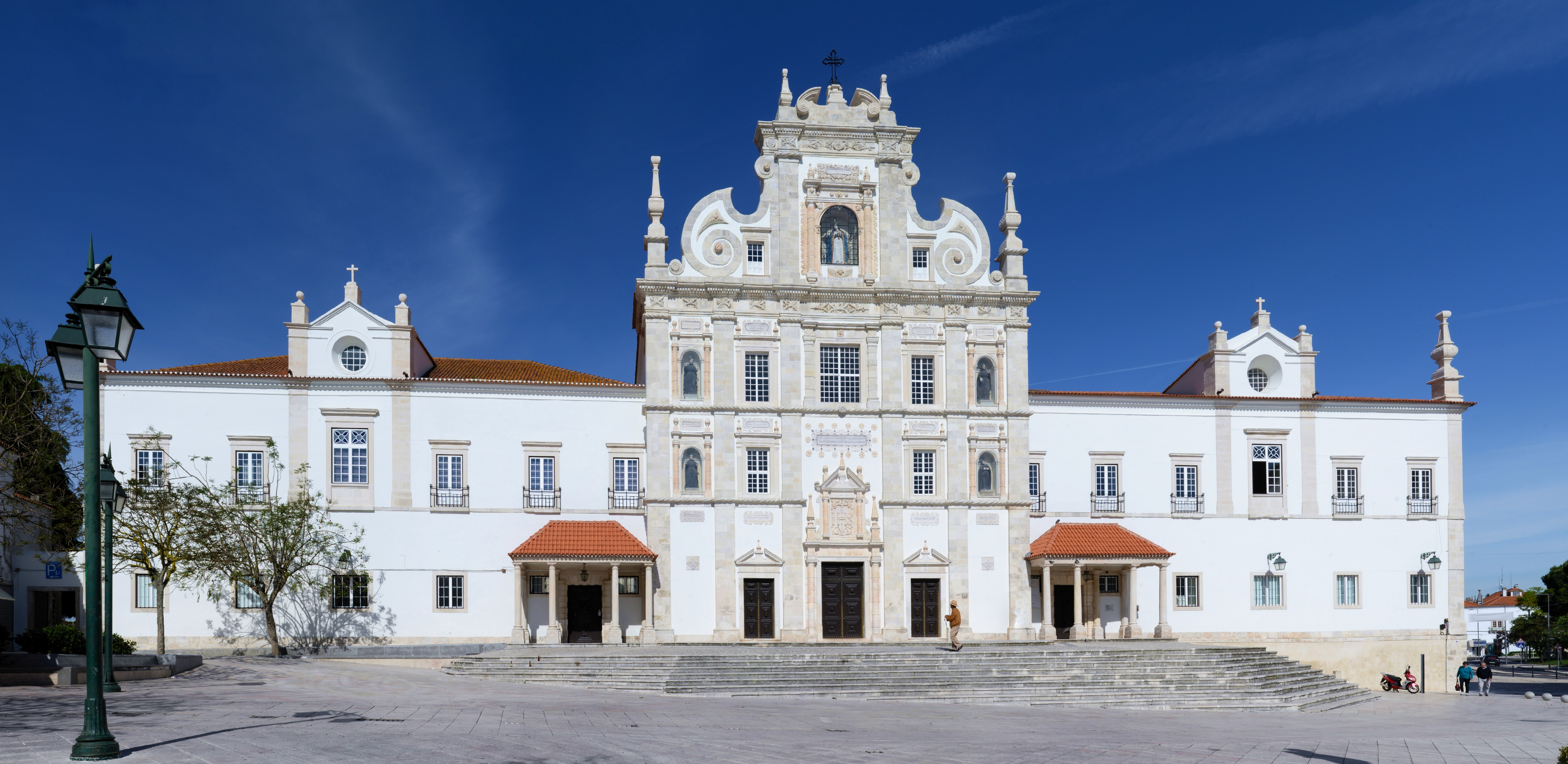
Santarém Cathedral
