= Albino Mamede Cleto =

Portuguese bishop

His Most Reverend Excellency, Dom Albino I
- Bishop of Coimbra and Count of Arganil
- Church: Catholic Church
- Archdiocese: Archdiocese of Braga
- Province: Braga
- Metropolis: Braga
- Diocese: Coimbra
- See: Coimbra
- Appointed: 28 April 2011
- Installed: 10 July 2011
- Predecessor: Albino I
- Successor: Virgílio do Nascimento Antunes
- Other post: Count of Arganil
- Previous posts: Titular Bishop of Illiberi (1983-1997); Coadjutor Bishop of Coimbra (1997-2001); Bishop Emeritus of Coimbra (2011-2012)

Orders
- Ordination: 15 August 1959
- Consecration: 22 January 1983 by António Ribeiro, Cardinal-Patriarch of Lisbon
- Rank: Bishop

Personal details
- Born: Albino Mamede Cleto; 3 March 1935 Manteigas, Portugal
- Died: 15 June 2012 (aged 77) Coimbra, Portugal
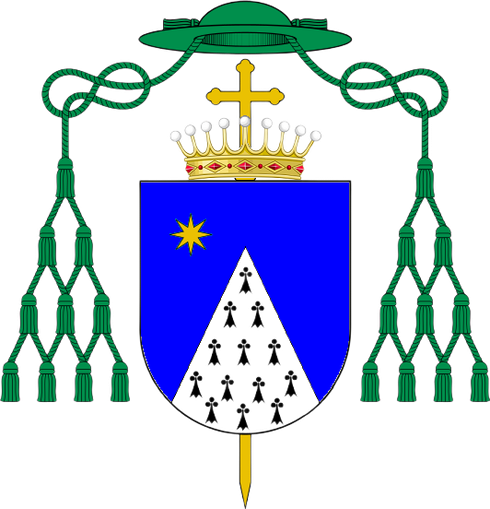
- Coat of arms

Albino Mamede Cleto (3 March 1935 – 15 June 2012) was the Roman Catholic bishop of the Roman Catholic Diocese of Coimbra, Portugal, therefore becoming ex officio 29th Count of Arganil. Ordained in 1959, Mamede Cleto was named bishop in 1982 and retired in 2011.

== Biography ==
Descendant of the Cleto da Cunha family, a family of rural landowners and wool industry entrepreneurs from Manteigas, with ancestry traced to Afonso Saraiva de Lucena, Lord of the House of Póvoa, in Trancoso. He is related to the Minister of Justice and Peer of the Realm, Manuel Duarte Leitão, and the industrialist from Manteigas, Joaquim Pereira de Mattos.

He attended the Patriarchal Seminary of Lisbon, a diocese where he was ordained as a priest on 15 August 1959. He earned a degree in Romance Languages from the Faculty of Arts at the University of Lisbon and was an occasional professor at the Catholic University of Lisbon, where he taught Languages and Literature.

He was a teacher at the Diocesan Externato Frei Luís de Sousa (1970–1978), an occasional lecturer in the Department of Philosophy at the Catholic University of Portugal (1978), and held various representative and service roles in several structures of the patriarchate:

In the Patriarchate of Lisbon, he was part of the formation team of the Almada Seminary as Prefect of Studies and Vice-Rector, presided over the Administrative Commission of the Christ the King Sanctuary, was the parish priest of the Estrela Parish, and a member of the Diocesan Commission for Sacred Art of the Patriarchate.

He was appointed Auxiliary Bishop of Lisbon on 6 December 1982, with the title of Elvira by Pope John Paul II. His episcopal ordination took place on 22 January 1983, at the Jerónimos Monastery, where he was ordained by Cardinal António Ribeiro, Patriarch of Lisbon, Bishop João Alves of Coimbra, and Auxiliary Bishop José da Cruz Policarpo of Lisbon.

The inauguration of the Amoreiras Shopping Center on 27 September 1985, was a significant national event as it was the first large shopping center in Portugal. On this occasion, Bishop Albino Cleto was tasked with blessing the establishment alongside the then President of the Republic, General Ramalho Eanes. This shopping center was designed by architect Tomás Taveira and was noted for its modern and innovative design at the time.

Bishop Albino Cleto coordinated Pope John Paul II's visit to Portugal in 1991, which was highlighted as the pontiff's third pastoral visit to the country. Held between 10 and 13 May, the trip included moments of deep spiritual significance, especially at the Sanctuary of Fátima, where the Pope reiterated his gratitude for the divine protection he believed he received during the assassination attempt in 1981, attributing his survival to the intervention of Our Lady of Fátima.

Bishop Albino Cleto also served as president of the Episcopal Commission for Church Cultural Heritage and a member of the Episcopal Commission for Culture, Cultural Heritage, and Social Communications.

On 28 April 2011, his resignation was accepted due to age limits by His Holiness Pope Benedict XVI. From that date, he served as the apostolic administrator of the Diocese of Coimbra, and from 10 July 2011, he became the Bishop Emeritus of the Diocese of Coimbra. He continued to serve as a member of the Episcopal Commission for Liturgy and Spirituality.

He died on 15 June 2012, at the University Hospitals of Coimbra.

== Funeral and beatification of Sister Lúcia, Visionary of Fátima ==
The funeral of Sister Lúcia in the New Cathedral of Coimbra was presided over by the Holy Father John Paul II, represented by his Special Envoy, Cardinal Tarcisio Bertone, Archbishop of Genoa (Italy). A message from His Holiness Pope John Paul II for the funeral of Sister Lúcia was sent to Bishop Albino Cleto of Coimbra and read during the ceremony by Cardinal Bertone:

To the venerable Brother Albino Mamede Cleto, Bishop of Coimbra

With deep emotion, I learned that Sister Maria Lúcia of Jesus and the Immaculate Heart, at the age of 97, was called by the Heavenly Father to the eternal mansion of Heaven. Thus, she reached the goal she always aspired to in the prayer and silence of the convent.

The liturgy of these days reminded us that death is the common heritage of the children of Adam but, at the same time, gave us the certainty that Jesus, with the sacrifice of the cross, opened the doors to immortal life. We recall these certainties of faith as we give our last farewell to this humble and devout Carmelite, who dedicated her life to Christ, the Savior of the world.

The visit of the Virgin Mary that young Lúcia received in Fátima, along with her cousins Francisco and Jacinta in 1917, was for her the beginning of a singular mission to which she remained faithful until the end of her days. Sister Lúcia leaves us an example of great fidelity to the Lord and joyful adherence to His divine will.

I remember with emotion the various meetings I had with her and the spiritual bonds of friendship that were intensified over time. I always felt supported by her daily prayer, especially in the hard moments of trial and suffering. May the Lord reward her abundantly for the great and hidden service she rendered to the Church.

I am pleased to think that to welcome Sister Lúcia, in her pious passage from this earth to Heaven, it was precisely the One she saw in Fátima so many years ago. May the Most Holy Virgin now accompany the soul of this devout daughter to the blessed encounter with the Divine Spouse.

I entrust you, Venerable Brother, with the task of ensuring the spiritual proximity of the nuns of the Carmel of Coimbra, by granting, as a token of consolation at this moment of separation, a heartfelt Blessing, extended to family members, to you, to Cardinal Tarcisio Bertone, my special envoy, and to all participants in the sacred rite of suffrage.

Vatican, February 14, 2005,

John Paul II

On 13 February 2008, Cardinal José Saraiva Martins, Prefect of the Congregation for the Causes of Saints, on the anniversary of the death of the "visionary of Fátima," announced that Pope Benedict XVI, responding to the request of Bishop Albino Mamede Cleto of Coimbra, shared by numerous Bishops and faithful around the world, authorized, as an exception to the norms of Canon Law (article 9 of the Normae servandae), the initiation of the diocesan phase of her beatification cause, only three years after her death, thus anticipating the process, since normally at least five years must pass after death.

The diocesan phase of the process was opened on 30 April 2008, by Bishop Albino Cleto, then Bishop of Coimbra. The solemn closure of this stage took place on 13 February 2017.

In October 2022, the beatification and canonization process of the religious experienced a significant development, with the delivery in the Vatican of the document on heroic virtues.

At the act of delivering the Positio Super Vita, Virtutibus et Fama Sanctitatis (on life, virtues, and fame of holiness), in Rome, were present Cardinal Marcello Semeraro; the general postulator of the cause of canonization, Father Marco Chiesa; the vice-postulator, Sister Ângela de Fátima Coelho; the relator, Monsignor Maurizio Tagliaferri; and Sister Filipa Pereira. This document was analyzed by a group of nine theologians who issued a favorable opinion on the practice of virtues to a heroic degree.

On 22 June 2023, Pope Francis approved the publication of the decree recognizing the "heroic virtues" of the religious, following an audience with the Prefect of the Dicastery for the Causes of Saints, Cardinal Marcello Semeraro, a necessary step for beatification.

Currently, Lúcia is considered Venerable.

== Funeral of Bishop Albino Cleto at the New Cathedral of Coimbra ==
Bishop Albino Cleto died at the age of 77 at the University Hospital of Coimbra. He was Auxiliary Bishop of Lisbon from 1983 to 1997, at which time he was appointed Coadjutor of Coimbra. With the resignation of Bishop João Alves, Bishop Albino Cleto assumed the governance of this diocese in 2001, leading the Church of Coimbra for 10 years. At the age of 75, he requested resignation, and Bishop Virgílio Antunes succeeded him. Upon leaving the governance of the Diocese of Coimbra, Bishop Albino Cleto returned to the parish of São Pedro, in Manteigas, his hometown. After lying in state at the New Cathedral of Coimbra, he was taken to his hometown, in the Diocese of Guarda. Many civil and religious personalities wished to mark their presence at the New Cathedral of Coimbra for a final tribute to Bishop Albino Cleto, a man who served the Church and society.

Some figures who paid the final tribute to Bishop Albino Cleto at the New Cathedral of Coimbra:

Cardinal José Policarpo, Patriarch of Lisbon Bishop Manuel Clemente of Porto (future Cardinal Patriarch of Lisbon) Bishop Virgílio Antunes of Coimbra Bishop João Lavrador, Auxiliary Bishop of Porto (future Bishop of Viana do Castelo) Cardoso da Costa, former President of the Constitutional Court Dr. João Paulo Barbosa de Melo, Mayor of Coimbra

== Testimonials about Bishop Albino Cleto ==
Cavaco Silva, President of the Republic: "He exercised a significant magisterium and pastoral action, both for his humanistic sense of openness to the world and for the clarity with which, in line with the teaching of the Second Vatican Council, he knew how to read the signs of the times."

Guilherme d’Oliveira Martins, President of the National Culture Center: "His intelligence, humanism, and culture remain in the memory of all."

Cardinal José Policarpo, Patriarch of Lisbon, President of the Portuguese Episcopal Conference: "Mr. Albino was from the clergy of Lisbon, he spent his entire life since entering the seminary in Lisbon. Lisbon owes him a lot. He experienced practically all the experiences a priest can have: he was a seminary professor, he was a parish priest of Estrela, then he was an auxiliary bishop for several years, where we were together. And at this moment, when he was starting a period of life that is usually calmer... well, but it seems Our Lord has other plans. And I have no doubt that He welcomed him because he was a very good man, with a very beautiful and simple heart." "Our Lord has His ways, He thought he already deserved the eternal reward... Some colleagues even joked with him because they interpreted his inner candor as a certain naivety."

Bishop Manuel Clemente of Porto (future Cardinal Patriarch of Lisbon): "He was a man of extreme pastoral dedication and was still going to his hometown and there collaborated with the priest among the priests in Manteigas and whatever was needed, and in the Episcopal Conference. And he was still with me 15 days ago, passed through Porto, on his way to the United States of America, to do a service with the emigrants, and I imagine it must have been with the same dedication. And he was a man always attached to life and contacts. He was an enchanting figure!"

Bishop Virgílio Antunes of Coimbra, his successor: "I always saw in him, then and now, a very affable, very close, very friendly man, with great faith, with a great spirit of service. This last year touched me personally a lot since he welcomed me as the successor in this mission of Bishop of Coimbra with open arms, with enormous sympathy and many demonstrations of support, trying to encourage and inspire me. Therefore, personally, I keep a very beautiful memory of this man who had a very great inner candor." "His way of being and his attitude in life made him a man of God, in a relationship of closeness and friendship, which left marks on the People of God, both on laypeople and religious, but especially on priests."

Bishop João Lavrador, Auxiliary Bishop of Porto (future Bishop of Viana do Castelo): "I accompanied Bishop Albino for a decade in the diocese, and it was a very gratifying decade because of the person he was, for his simplicity, his intelligence, and above all, his faith, as a pastor who really tirelessly energized the diocese. His death, in the end, was the reflection of precisely that dedication, that commitment, and the constant concern of being close to all people."

Dr. João Paulo Barbosa de Melo, Mayor of Coimbra: "I think everyone who knew Bishop Albino Cleto feels great affection for him. He was a very approachable person, a shepherd in the sense... not the shepherd of authority, but the shepherd of friendship. People were drawn to Bishop Albino, especially through the heart."

Father Nuno Santos: "For me, Bishop Albino was my bishop, as I was ordained by him, being the first priest he ordained in this diocese. It was an experience of great closeness, great complicity, great friendship, and Bishop Albino marks us with his simplicity, his presence, a very friendly presence. That is the great mark of his ministry here in Coimbra and also in the relationship I maintain with him."
