= Duarte Galvão =

Portuguese diplomat (1435 or 1440–1517)

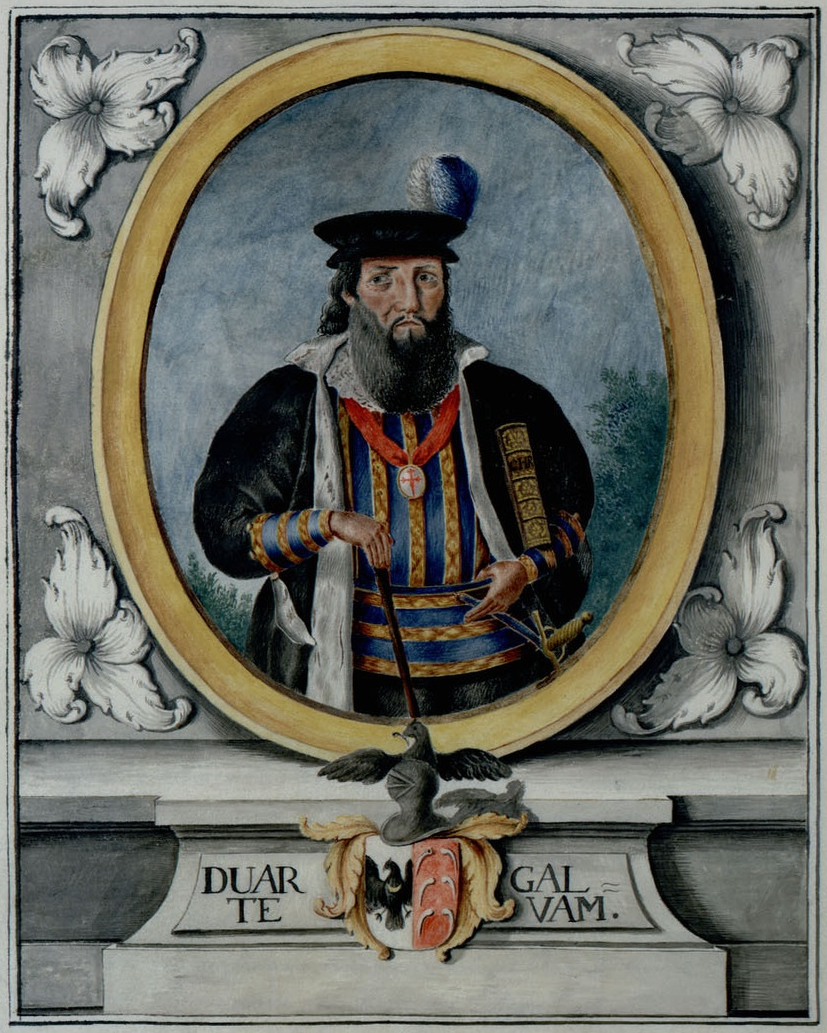
Galvão depicted in his Chronica

Duarte Galvão (1435/1440 – 9 June 1517) was a Portuguese courtier, diplomat and chronicler.

== Biography ==
Duarte was born in Évora between about 1435 and 1440. His father, Rui Galvão, was a clerk of the royal chamber (escrivão da cámara) before 1429, then secretary of King Edward (1433–1438) and finally clerk of the purity (escrivão da puridade) under Afonso V (1438–1481). He led several embassies to the Kingdom of Castile. Duarte had an older brother, João Galvão, who was the bishop of Coimbra (1460–1481) and then archbishop of Braga (1481–1485). He served as legate to Portugal for Pope Pius II from 1461 until 1464.

From 1464, Duarte was a secretary and notary to the crown under kings Afonso V, John II and Manuel I, who entrusted him with many embassies. In 1489, he was sent to the French court to declare war on King Charles VIII of France. Between 1503 and 1505, at the request of Manuel I, Duarte wrote a chronicle of the reign of Portugal's first king, Afonso Henriques. Known as the Chronica do Muito Alto e Muito Esclarecido Principe D. Afonso Henriques, Primeiro Rey de Portugal, it is Duarte's only known literary work. The manuscript is kept in the Torre do Tombo National Archive. It was edited by Miguel Lopes Ferreira and printed in 1726, the first in a series of chronicles of Portugal's early kings. The next five were written by Duarte's contemporary, Rui de Pina.

At the court of Manuel I, Duarte favoured Portuguese involvement in the Indian Ocean. This he justified by appeal to the millenarian teachings of Joachim of Fiore and the objectives of recovering Jerusalem and blockading of the Red Sea. An undated letter by Duarte to Afonso de Albuquerque develops his religious conception of the Portuguese expeditions. Another letter of Duarte's, probably from 1514, was addressed to António Carneiro, the secretary of state.

In 1515, Duarte led the embassy that accompanied Matthew, the ambassador of Queen Helena of Ethiopia, on his return journey to Ethiopia. Francisco Álvares took part in this mission. They embarked on 7 April 1515 with Lopo Soares de Albergaria, who was to replace Afonso de Albuquerque as governor of Portuguese India. Because of the rivalry between Albergaria and Albuquerque, Duarte's mission was stranded in Goa until early 1517. He died o 9 June 1517 on the island of Kamaran before reaching Ethiopia.

=== Marriage and children ===
Duarte Galvão's first wife was Catarina de Sousa de Albuquerque, first cousin of Afonso de Albuquerque. They were wed on 11 April 1475, when she was between 19 and 24 years old. They had one daughter :

- Isabel de Albuquerque Galvão, who on 25 April 1504 married Jorge Garcês, secretary of Manuel I.

He married his second wife, Catarina da Silva Vasconcelos, in 1486, when she was between 25 and 28 years old. She outlived him, dying on 23 February 1524. With her, he had :

- three daughters (Isabel, Leonor and Violante, who married Pero Anes do Canto)
- seven sons (Guiomar, Simão, António, Jorge, Manuel, Francisco and Rui).

He also had two illegitimate sons, another António and Pedro Vieira da Silva.

== Bibliography ==
- Aubin, Jean (1975). "Duarte Galvão". Arquivos do Centro Cultural Português. 9: 43–85. Reprinted in Le latin et l'astrolabe: Recherches sur le Portugal de la Renaissance, son expansion en Asie et les relations internationales (Paris, Fondation Calouste Gulkenbian, 1996), vol. 1, pp. 11–48.
- Costa Gomes, Rita (2003). The Making of a Court Society: Kings and Nobles in Late Medieval Portugal. Cambridge University Press.
- Pereira, G. (1906). "Prologo". Chronica de el-rei D. Affonso Henriques. Lisbon.
- Sousa Viterbo, Francisco de (1905). "Duarte Galvão e a sua família: elementos para um estudo biográfico". História e memorias da Academia Real das Sciencias de Lisboa. 11 (1): 1–95.
