= João Galvão =

Portuguese Catholic clergyman

His Most Reverend Excellency, Dom João IV
- Archebishop of Braga, Bishop of Coimbra and Count of Arganil
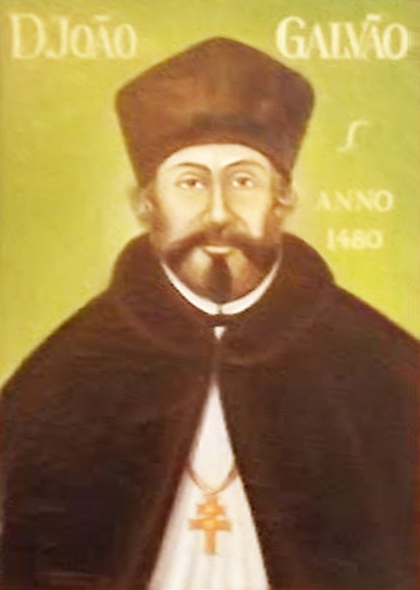
- Church: Catholic Church
- Archdiocese: Archdiocese of Braga
- Province: Braga
- Metropolis: Braga
- Diocese: Coimbra (1460-1482); Braga (1482-1485)
- See: Coimbra (1460-1482); Braga (1482-1485)
- Previous post: Count of Arganil (1472-1482) Bishop of Coimbra (1460-1482)

Orders
- Rank: Archbishop, Bishop

Personal details
- Born: c. 1426
- Died: 1485
- Buried: Xabregas Convent

João Galvão, originally João Rodrigues da Costa or João Rodrigues Galvão (c. 1426 - 1485), was a Portuguese Catholic clergyman and the first to hold the title of Count of Arganil.

== Family and origins ==
João Galvão was the son of Rui Galvão and his wife Branca Gonçalves, and the brother of the chronicler Duarte Galvão. There are two seals from this João Galvão from 1467 on which, as well as a religious figure, there is a shield with the da Costa coat of arms, which confirms that he was descended by varony from Afonso Lopes da Costa. In fact, he used the name João Rodrigues da Costa as a young man.

== Career ==
=== Early career ===
He was a Friar at the Monastery of Santa Cruz de Coimbra, receiving the habit of Canon Regent in 1448, Canon of the Cathedral of Coimbra and Abbot of the Church of São Julião de Azurara and São Martinho de Pindo. On 31 May 1451, King Afonso V gave João Rodrigues da Costa, son of Rui Galvão, his secretary and knight of his house, an annual pension of 5,000 reals of silver for his studies. On 7 July 1451, King Afonso V granted Vasco de Resende, Professor of Logic in the city of Lisbon, at the request of João Rodrigues, son of Rui Galvão, his servant, Canon of the Cathedral of Coimbra and Abbot of the Church of São Julião de Azurara and São Martinho de Pindo, granting them permission to carry a sword in both hands throughout the kingdom.

=== Papal Legate ===
In 1451 he traveled to Italy as chaplain to the Infanta Leonor, sister of King Afonso V of Portugal, who was about to marry Frederick III, Holy Roman Emperor. He was received in Siena by Prelate Enea Silvio Piccolomini, Patrician of Siena, with whom he corresponded on historical matters. That Prelate ascended the pontifical throne under the name of Pius II and appointed João Galvão his Legate in Portugal. On 1 July 1456, Galvão was presented at the Church of São Julião de Azurara, in the Bishopric of Viseu.

=== Bishop of Coimbra ===
On the death of the 19th Prior-Major of the Monastery of Santa Cruz de Coimbra, Galvão was chosen as the 20th holder of that position, which he held for only a short time, because in 1460 he was invested with the dignity of 36th Bishop of Coimbra, to the satisfaction of the King and the Pope, but with great opposition from the Portuguese episcopate. On 18 March 1462, King Afonso V authorised the Apostolic Legate João Galvão, Bishop of Coimbra, to carry out what he had been commissioned to do by Pope Pius II. He was also a member of the King's Council, of whom he was a great friend, and was already mentioned as such when, on 30 August 1462, King Afonso V pardoned all those who had been involved in taking Rui de Olivença, Bishop of Coimbra, Papal Legate and his Council, from the Coimbra city jail. When Pius II died on 14 August 1464 and Paul II ascended to the pontificate on 30 August of that year, his powers as Papal Legate were taken away. On 25 April 1468, King Afonso V gave Bishop João Galvão, Bishop of Coimbra, an annual rent of 150,000 reals of silver for his settlement.

=== Count of Arganil ===
Galvão was part of the expeditions to Asilah, taken on 24 August 1471, and to Tangier. On 18 August 1472, King Afonso V appointed João Galvão, Bishop of Coimbra and Count of Santa Comba, a member of his Council and already his Clerk of the Purity, to the post of Chief Intendant of the Kingdom's Works and Lord Mayor of the Counties' Bags of Beira e Ribacoa. On 25 September 1472 he was elevated to the honours of Nobility by King Afonso V, who privileged João Galvão, Bishop of Coimbra, of his Council, by letter, for his services in the conquest of the town of Asilah and the city of Tangier, granting him the title of 1st Count of Arganil, with all his rights, privileges and jurisdiction, for himself and all his successors in the said Bishopric, in æternum in the chair of Coimbra. In a Provision of 25 November 1471, this 1st Count of Arganil signed himself 1st Count of Santa Comba, which suggests that he had already been granted this title and that the Letter of 25 September 1472 was merely a change to it.

In the Chancelleries from before 1472, however, the title of Count of Santa Comba was not granted. Afonso Álvares Nogueira, who transcribed the Letter of Grant of this title, adds: "And yet ~before this some~us prelates of this see had been called Counts of Santa Comba it was by .m. particular of the Kings but not de jure As they are now called Counts of Arganil." On 3 January 1473 D. Afonso V favoured D. João Galvão, Bishop of Arganil. Afonso V favours João Galvão, Bishop of Coimbra, Count of Arganil, of his Council, Clerk of the Purity, Chief Viceroy of the Royal Works, granting him and his successors who are Bishops of the city of Coimbra licence to appoint a notary for the place of Arganil.

=== Archbishop of Braga ===
In the last years of his life, he lost the good graces of the King, who was then John II, and the Pope, who was then Sixtus IV. Appointed the 33rd Archbishop of Braga in 1481, he took possession of the Archdiocese in 1482 before receiving the relevant Papal Bull, which never reached Portugal. He resigned from the Archbishopric in 1485, when he had already been replaced in the See of Coimbra.
