= Virgílio do Nascimento Antunes =

Portuguese Catholic bishop (born 1961)

His Most Reverend Excellency, Dom Virgílio I
- Bishop of Coimbra and Count of Arganil
- Church: Catholic Church
- Archdiocese: Archdiocese of Braga
- Province: Braga
- Metropolis: Braga
- Diocese: Coimbra
- See: Coimbra
- Appointed: 28 April 2011
- Installed: 10 July 2011
- Predecessor: Albino I
- Other post: Count of Arganil
- Previous post: Rector of the Shrine of Fatima (2008-2011)

Orders
- Ordination: 4 July 1987
- Consecration: 3 July 2011 by Cardinal António Marto, Bishop of Leiria-Fátima, Anacleto Cordeiro Gonçalves de Oliveira, Bishop of Viana do Castelo and Albino Mamede Cleto, Bishop Emeritus of Coimbra
- Rank: Bishop

Personal details
- Born: Virgílio do Nascimento Antunes; 22 September 1961 (age 64) Batalha
- Motto: Praedicamus Christum crucifixum, Dei Sapientiam
- Coat of arms

Virgílio do Nascimento Antunes (Batalha, São Mamede, 22 September 1961) is a Portuguese Catholic bishop, currently Bishop of the Diocese of Coimbra and ex officio the 30th Count of Arganil.

== Biography ==
He was ordained a priest in the Diocese of Leiria-Fatima on 29 September 1985. Since then, he has taken on various roles in the same diocese, most notably in the formation of candidates for the priesthood, as a formator and rector. In the meantime, he specialised in biblical sciences in Rome and Jerusalem.

On 25 September 2008 he took up the post of rector of the Shrine of Fatima for a five-year mandate.

On April 28, 2011, he was appointed bishop of the Diocese of Coimbra by Pope Benedict XVI. He was ordained bishop on July 3, 2011, in the Basilica of the Holy Trinity, in Fátima, by Cardinal António Marto, bishop of Leiria-Fátima, Anacleto Oliveira, bishop of Viana do Castelo and by Albino Cleto, bishop from Coimbra.

He took office as Bishop of Coimbra on July 10, 2011, in Coimbra.
