= Diocese of Bragança-Miranda =

Roman Catholic diocese in Portugal

Coordinates: 41.8056°N 6.7622°W

Diocese of Bragança-Miranda Dioecesis Brigantiensis-Mirandensis Diocese de Bragança-Miranda

Catholic
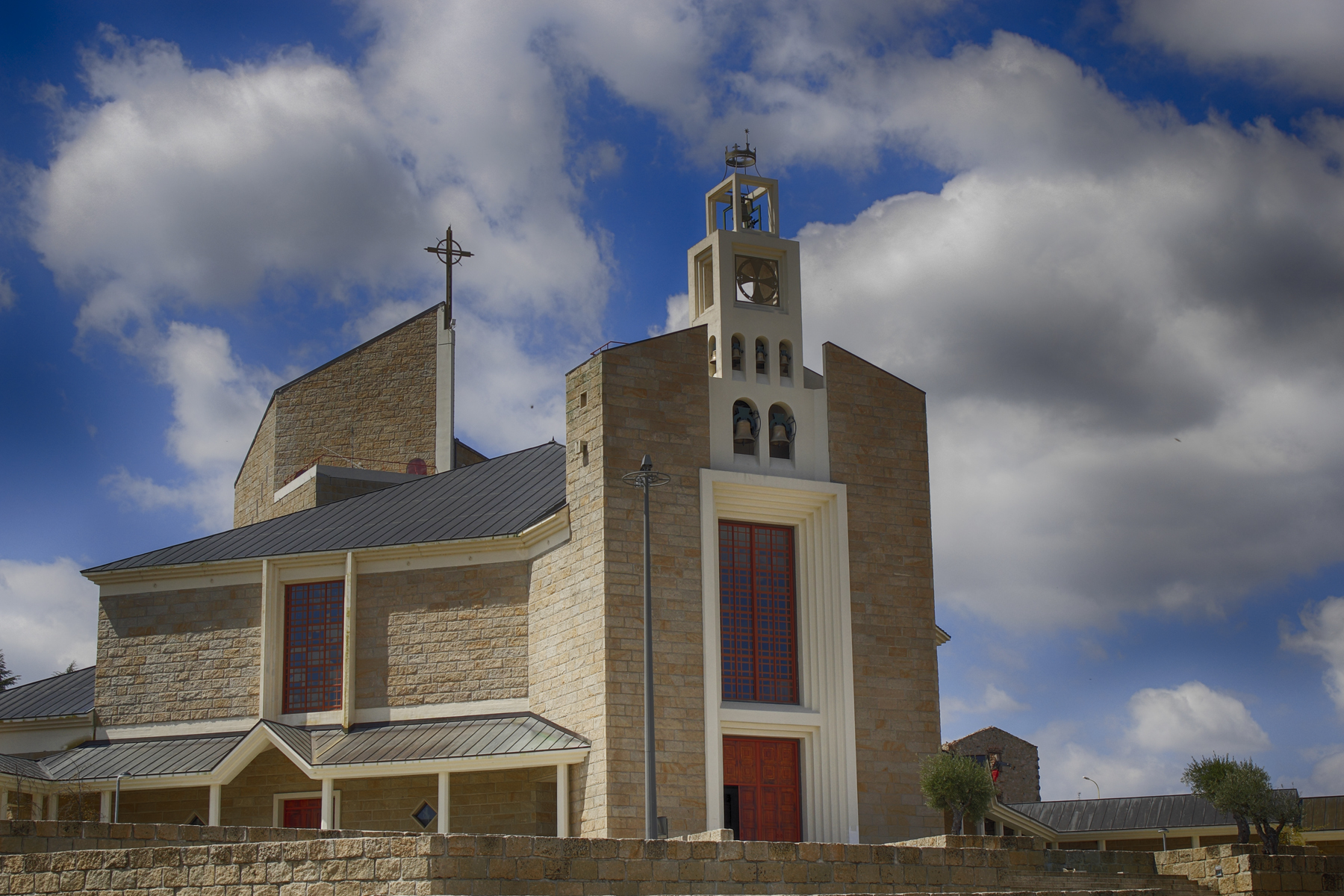
- Cathedral of Braganza

Location
- Country: Portugal
- Ecclesiastical province: Braga
- Metropolitan: Archdiocese of Braga

Statistics
- Area: 6,545 km^{2} (2,527 sq mi)
- Population: Total; Catholics: (as of 2012); 151,900; 149,400 (98.4%)

Information
- Rite: Latin Rite
- Established: 5 March 1770
- Cathedral: Cathedral of Our Lady Queen in Braganza
- Co-cathedral: Co-Cathedral of St Mary in Miranda do Douro

Current leadership
- Pope: Leo XIV
- Bishop: José Manuel Garcia Cordeiro
- Metropolitan Archbishop: Jorge IV

Map

Website
- Website of the Diocese

The Diocese of Bragança–Miranda (Latin: Dioecesis Brigantiensis–Mirandensis), is a Latin Church diocese of the Catholic Church in the north-east of Portugal. It is a suffragan of the archdiocese of Braga. Its seats are the Cathedral of Braganza and the Co-Cathedral of Miranda do Douro.

== History ==
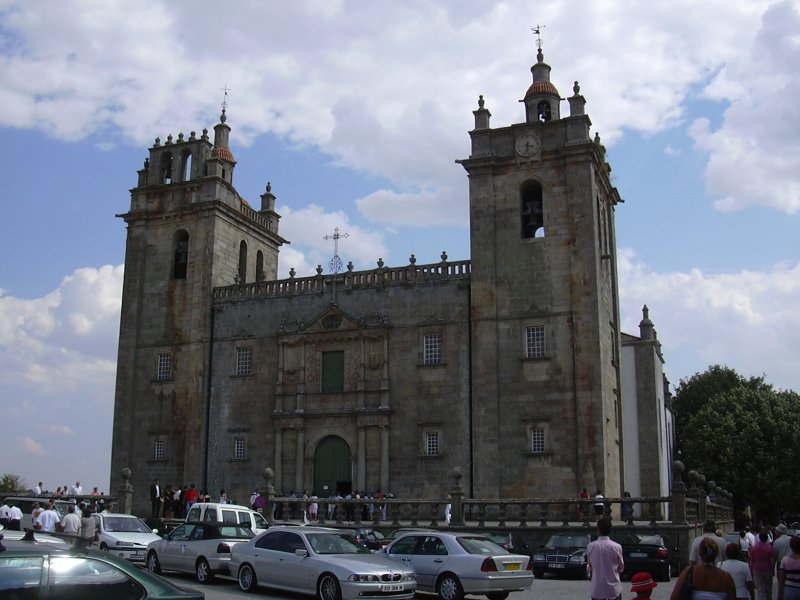
The Co-Cathedral of Miranda do Douro, the seat of the bishop until 1770

.

The see was created in 1545 by Pope Paul III in the town of Miranda do Douro bordering on Spain, its territory being taken from the Archdiocese of Braga. Pope Clement XIV transferred the episcopal seat to Bragança in 1770.

José Manuel Garcia Cordeiro is the current bishop. The previous bishop (2001–2011) was Bishop António Montes Moreira.
