= Centro Hospitalar =

Centro Hospitalar may refer to:

- China
  - Conde S. Januário Hospital (Centro Hospitalar Conde de São Januário) in Macau
- Portugal
  - Centro Hospitalar Cova da Beira
  - Centro Hospitalar Universitário de Lisboa Central
  - Centro Hospitalar de Coimbra
- São Tomé and Príncipe
  - Hospital Ayres de Menezes
