= Sea level rise in Venice =

Issue in the Italian city

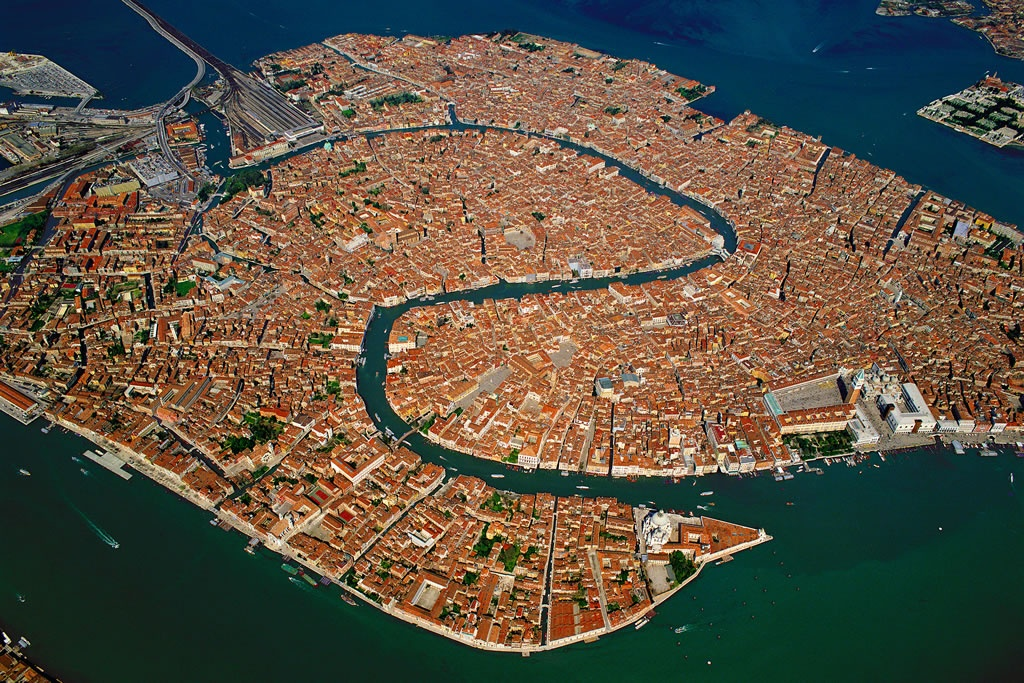
Aerial image of Venice and adjacent Lagoon

Rising sea levels pose a major threat to Venice, Italy. Known for its old structures, layers of history, and unique ties to the water, Venice faces increasing risks of major flooding and damage due to both rising sea levels and subsidence. Studies show a range of future projections for sea-level rise in Venice, with the likely outcome by 2100 being a rise of 21–52 cm.

Low elevation, proximity to the Venice lagoon, and the city's series of canals make it particularly vulnerable to sea level changes. Flooding is a frequent and damaging disruption that poses threats to cultural heritage, biodiversity, public health, and tourism. Venetians have implemented measures to mitigate these changes, such as glass barriers, elevating lower lying areas of the city, and MOSE, a series of floodgates to protect the lagoon from high tides.

Research paints a troubling picture for the future of the city and its surrounding areas if current climate trends continue or intensify.

== History ==
Since the 1990s Venice has experienced changes in relative sea level. This has been driven by a combination of global sea-level rise and local subsidence caused by tectonic plates shifting near the Italian coast. Between 1993 and 2019, tide-gauge measurements in Venice, after correcting for subsidence, indicate an average sea-level rise of approximately 2.76 ± 1.75 mm per year. This rate is higher than the historical trend observed between 1872 and 2019, which was estimated at 1.23 ± 0.13 mm per year.

Venetian sea level is linked to broader Mediterranean and Adriatic Sea trends, which are influenced by oceanic and atmospheric dynamics. The exchange of water through the Strait of Gibraltar is one factor contributing to uncertainties in regional sea-level rise projections. Short-term fluctuations in atmospheric pressure variations, storm surges, and tidal cycles also exacerbate the flooding events.

Sea-level rise has already affected Venice and will continue to challenge the city. The frequency and intensity of acqua alta (high water events) have increased. This has led to disruptions in daily life, damage to infrastructure, and a greater need for adaptive measures. In response, large-scale engineering projects like the MOSE (Modulo Sperimentale Elettromeccanico) barrier system have been developed to protect the city from extreme flooding. While these efforts have provided temporary relief, continued sea-level rise and ongoing subsidence remain pressing concerns for the long-term sustainability of Venice.

== Economic consequences ==
The MOSE system (Modulo Sperimentale Elettromeccanico) is a series of mobile gates designed to protect Venice and its lagoon from high tides. The cost of the MOSE system has exceeded €6 billion. The benefits of the MOSE system are expected to outweigh the expenses, as it has provided protection against flooding. The operation and maintenance of MOSE are expensive, adding a perpetual financial burden onto the city.

The implementation of the MOSE system also incurs direct costs on ship traffic, ranging from €348,000 to €1.3 million, due to longer wait times for harbor access. While these costs impact port activities, they are considered minor compared to the broader benefits the system provides to the city.

=== Tourism ===
Increased flooding also has a negative impact on tourism. Indirect losses arise from decreased tourism and regular disruptions to daily life. The November 2019 flood was particularly devastating. It caused extensive damage, fatalities, and highlighted the need for frequent and costly interventions. As a result hotel prices tend to decrease when there is a greater chance of flooding, further impacting the tourism sector.

The damage to historic buildings and cultural heritage is another concern. Saltwater intrusion and rising damp are threats to Venice's unique architectural and cultural heritage. Preservation and restoration efforts are expensive and also challenging with more frequent and severe flooding. This vulnerability compounds the tourism concerns.

The canals on which many historic structures are built contain stairways that provided access to waterways. These buildings often included waterproofed basements designed to mitigate water intrusion. Recent increases in sea levels have rendered many of these traditional flood-prevention methods insufficient. Several historical sites have already suffered damage due to the rising tides.

This deterioration has affected cultural landmarks such as the Teatro La Fenice opera house and the Cathedral of Murano. In addition to water damage, the accumulation of salt accelerates the degradation of building materials. Indoor monuments not directly exposed to flooding are falling apart due to increased moisture and repeated wetting. While building codes continue to be updated to ensure new constructions are more resilient, existing historical structures remain vulnerable to increasing environmental threats.

== Impact on infrastructure ==
=== Sewage systems ===
Venice's sewage systems are threatened by sea level rise through the increase in saltwater intrusion and back flow issues. With higher sea levels saltwater can penetrate further into the sewage system, disrupting its functionality and increasing the risk of contaminating freshwater. During high tide events, the system can become overwhelmed, which leads to overflows. Overflows contribute to pollution in both the lagoon and the city streets, posing public health risks.

=== Building foundations ===
Saltwater intrusion weakens building foundations over time, contributing to structural instability. This is problematic in Venice, where many buildings were and are constructed using porous materials such as brick and limestone, which readily absorb saltwater. The absorption of saltwater accelerates the deterioration of these materials, causing erosion. The costs associated with maintaining and restoring, preserving, and maintaining historic structures are increasing. More frequent flooding compounds these issues.

== Adaptation measures ==
One of the most well known projects is the MOSE system, which consists of 78 retractable gates, located at the three inlets of the Venetian Lagoon. The gates are about 60 feet long and 60 feet wide. They are attached to heavy concrete foundations on the sea floor through giant hinges. The decision to close the gates is based on meteorological factors. When flooding is iminent, air compressors expel seawater from the gates and fill them with air. The buoyancy of the gates cause them to rise above sea level. This process takes about thirty minutes. The gates are connected between man-made islands that house the control systems. The system can protect the city from tides of up to three meters (9.8 feet); however, due to accelerating climate change, it is estimated to be effective until the 2030s before requiring replacement. The project has been controversial due to its high cost and concerns over its environmental impact. This includes the potential for water stagnation in Venice's canals and lagoon during extended periods of deployment. This stagnant water can lead to the build up of waste water which, in turn, would lead to a loss of biodiversity as well.

In addition to MOSE, Venice monitors weather conditions from the Acqua Alta Oceanographic Tower. Built in 1970, the tower is located about 15 km off the coast.

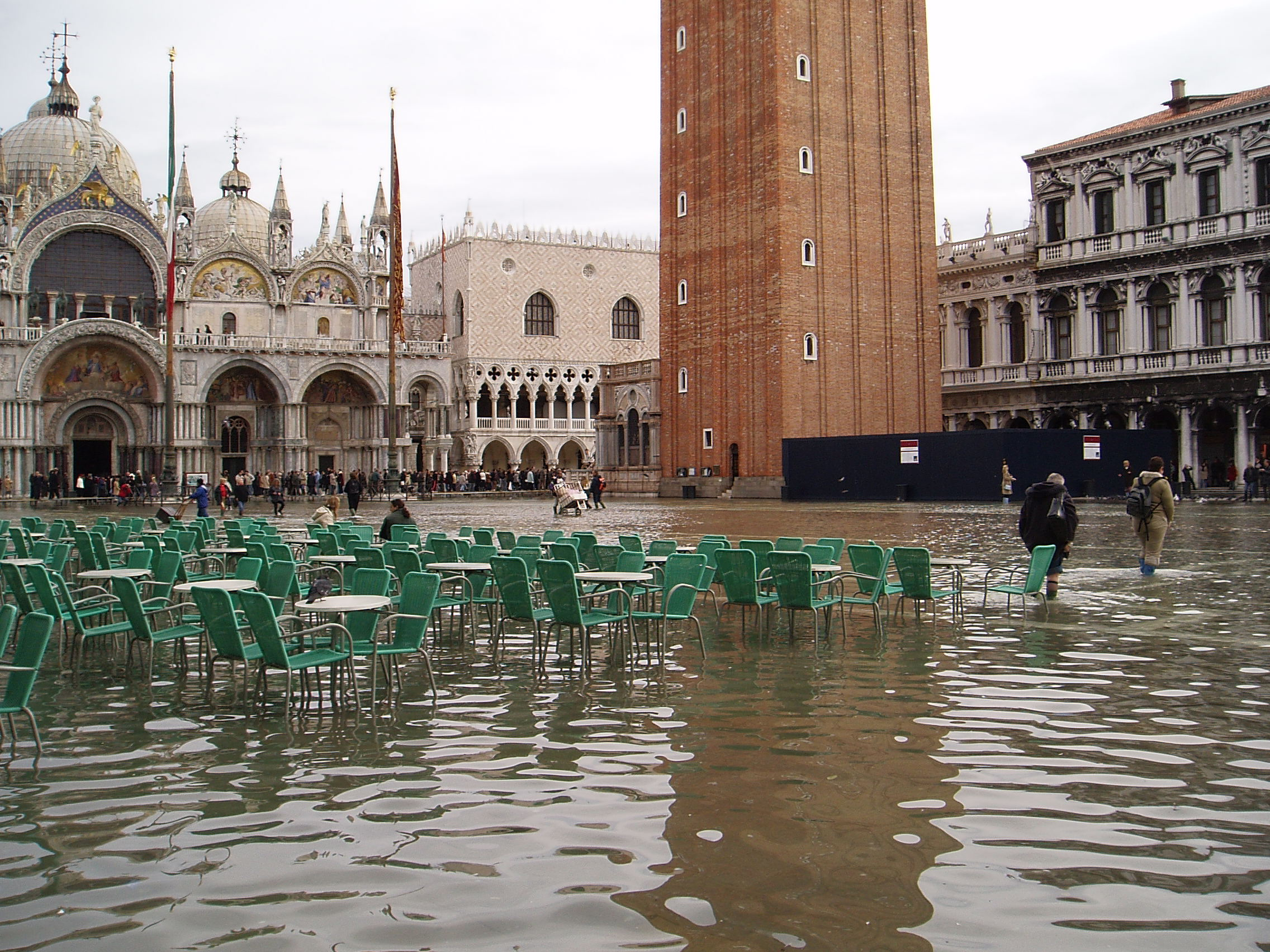
Acqua Alta in Piazza San Marco 2004

Other measures like transparent glass barriers have been installed around St. Mark's Basilica to shield it from flooding. These 1.2-meter-high barriers protect the basilica against flood levels up to two meters. Piazza San Marco, one of the lowest points in Venice, has been raised multiple times to prevent flood damage but has now reached the maximum elevation possible without altering its architectural style. Upgraded drainage systems have been installed to mitigate flooding; while they have reduced water accumulation, they cannot fully prevented it.

Coastal reinforcement efforts and the elevation of other urban areas are also happening.

== Projections ==
A 2018 study by Ivajnšič et al. modeled the impacts of sea level rise (SLR) scenarios in the Venice region using high-resolution geospatial data and habitat-based statistical modeling. Their research looked at four distinct SLR scenarios—three model-based and one based on a historical trend. These were placed across multiple time frames up to the year 2100.

Their conclusions revealed differences between the northern and southern sectors of the lagoon. Under all scenarios, the northern part is expected to experience earlier and more substantial submergence due to lower sediment accretion rates. By 2075, between 37% and 51% of the lagoon's salt marshes are projected to be underwater. By 2100 two scenarios predict near-total inundation of marsh habitats (up to 99.8%), while more moderate projections and the historical trend scenario estimate lower losses (~40-55%).

The study also highlighted concerns in habitat resilience. Lower-elevation marshes and vegetation zones, like the Spartina maritima, are most vulnerable. They could disappear from the northern lagoon as early as 2075. Some other habitat types in the southern lagoon may persist longer due to relatively higher sedimentation rates, which help offset rising sea levels.
