= Gerald of Braga =

Benedictine monk and archbishop

Saint Gerald of Braga
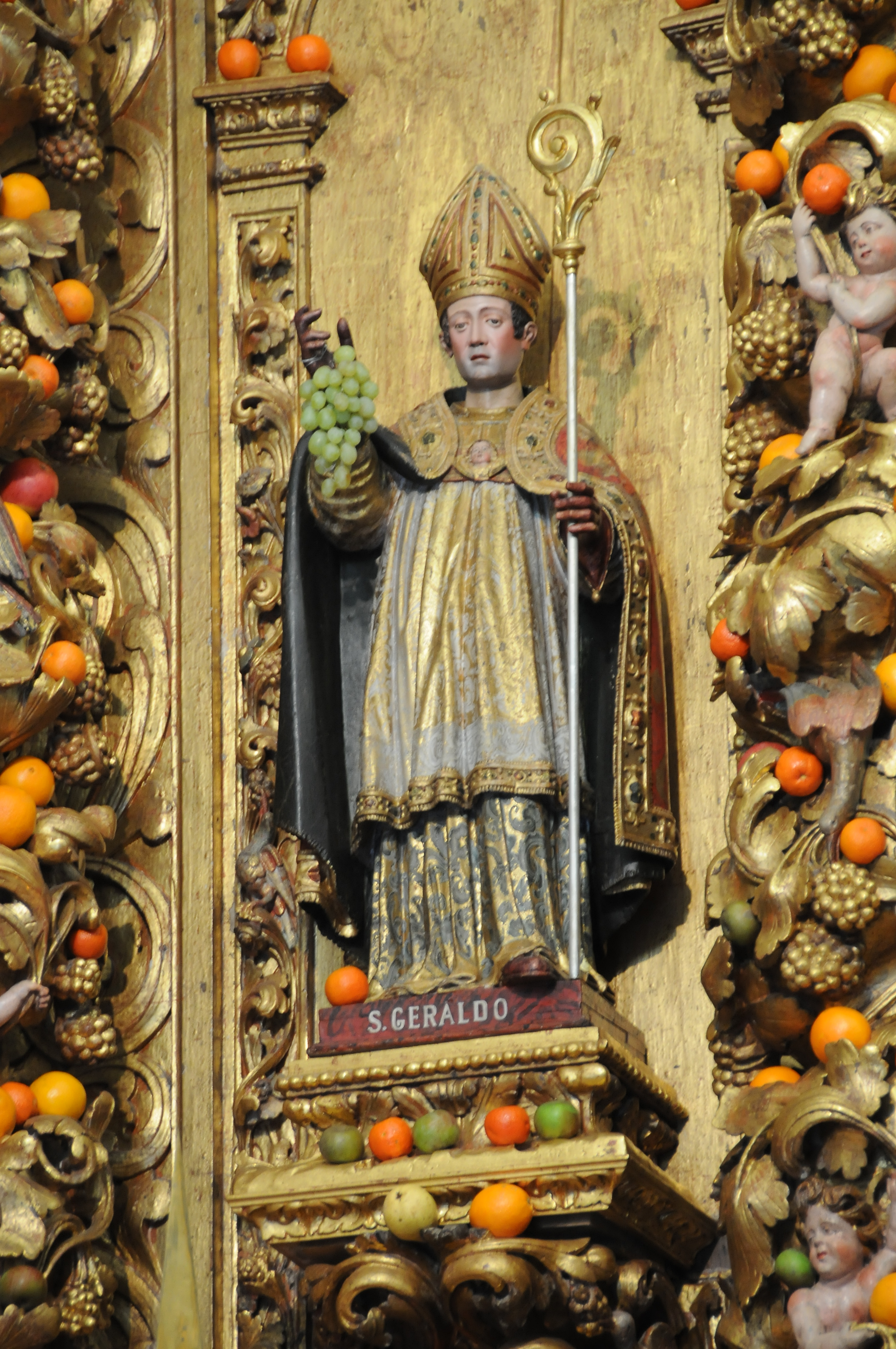

Bishop of Braga
- Born: Cahors, Gascony, Kingdom of France
- Died: December 5, 1109; Bornes, Vila Pouca de Aguiar, Kingdom of Galicia
- Venerated in: Roman Catholic Church
- Feast: December 5

Saint Gerald of Braga was an archbishop of Braga.

Gerald was born in Cahors, Gascony, and became a Benedictine monk at Moissac, France.

Archbishop Bernhard of Toledo, also a Cluniac monk, admired the liturgical singing in the monastery and asked Gerald to renew the liturgical music in Toledo. He served as the cathedral choir director.

In 1100, Gerald became Bishop of Braga in Portugal and ended ecclesiastical investiture by laypeople in his diocese. He baptised Afonso I of Portugal.

Gerald died on December 5, 1109, and was buried in Braga Cathedral.

The Vita Sancti Geraldi was written by one Bernard, a companion and fellow Cluniac monk from France.
