= Eurico Dias Nogueira =

His Excellency Eurico Dias Nogueira
- Archbishop Emeritus of Braga; Primate Emeritus of the Spains
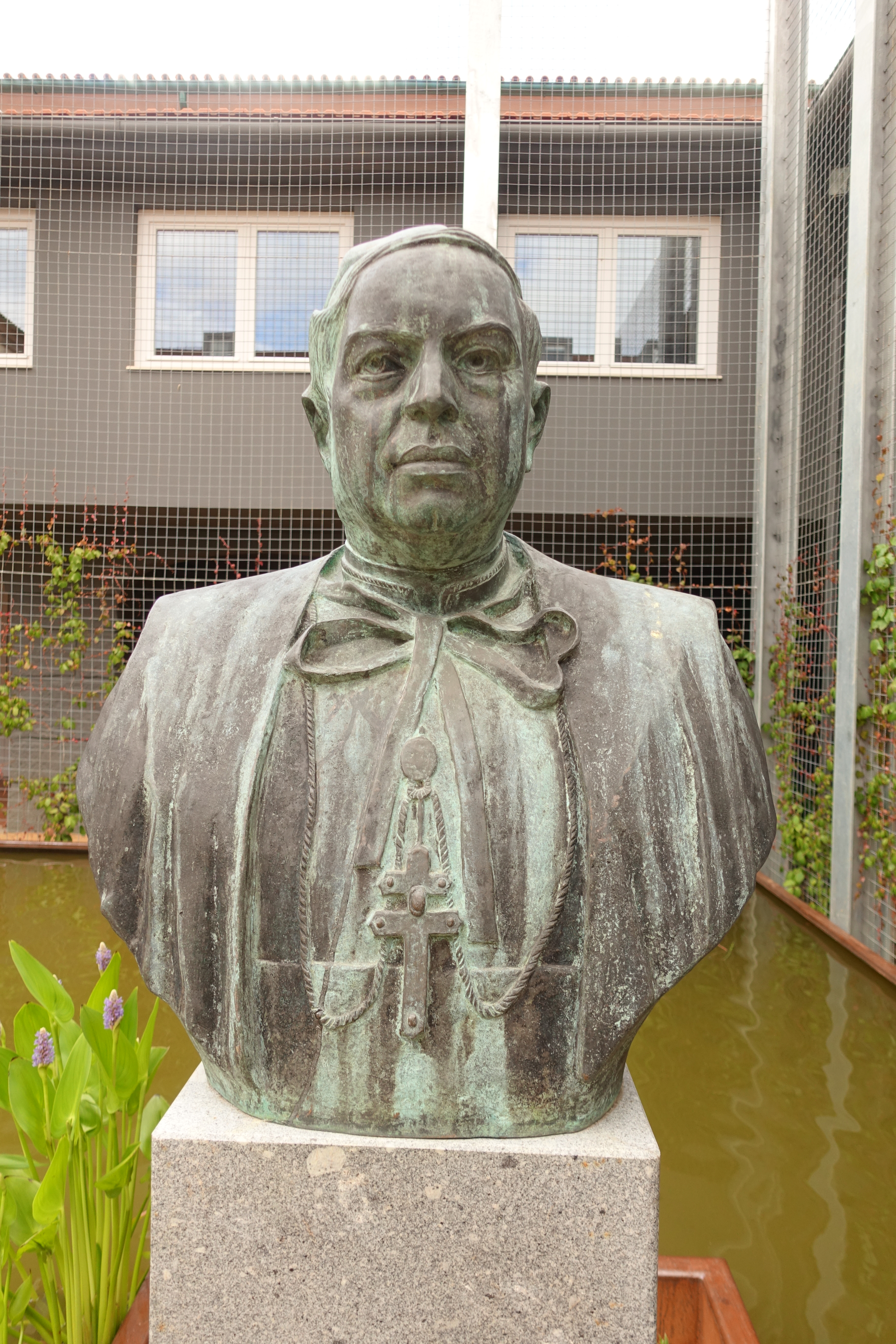
- Church: Roman Catholic Church
- See: Roman Catholic Archdiocese of Braga
- In office: 1977 - 1999
- Predecessor: Francisco Maria da Silva
- Successor: Jorge Ferreira da Costa Ortiga
- Previous posts: Bishop of Vila Cabral (1964-1972); Bishop of Sá da Bandeira (1972-1977)

Orders
- Ordination: 22 December 1945
- Consecration: 6 December 1964 by Ernesto Sena de Oliveira
- Rank: Archbishop

Personal details
- Born: 6 March 1923 Dornelas do Zêzere, Portugal
- Died: 19 May 2014 (aged 91) Braga, Portugal

Eurico Dias Nogueira (6 March 1923 – 19 May 2014) was a Portuguese Prelate of Catholic Church.

Nogueira was born in Dornelas do Zêzere, Portugal and was ordained a priest on 22 December 1945. Nogueira was appointed bishop to the Diocese of Vila Cabral on 10 July 1964 and ordained bishop on 6 December 1964. Nogueira was then appointed bishop of the Diocese of Sá da Bandeira on 19 February 1972 and resigned from the position on 3 February 1977. Nogueira's final appointment was to Archbishop-Primate of the Archdiocese of Braga and he retired as archbishop on 5 June 1999.
