= Castle of Vidigueira =

Castle in Vidigueira, Baixo Alentejo, Portugal

- Castelo da Vidigueira
- Beja, Baixo Alentejo, Alentejo in Portugal
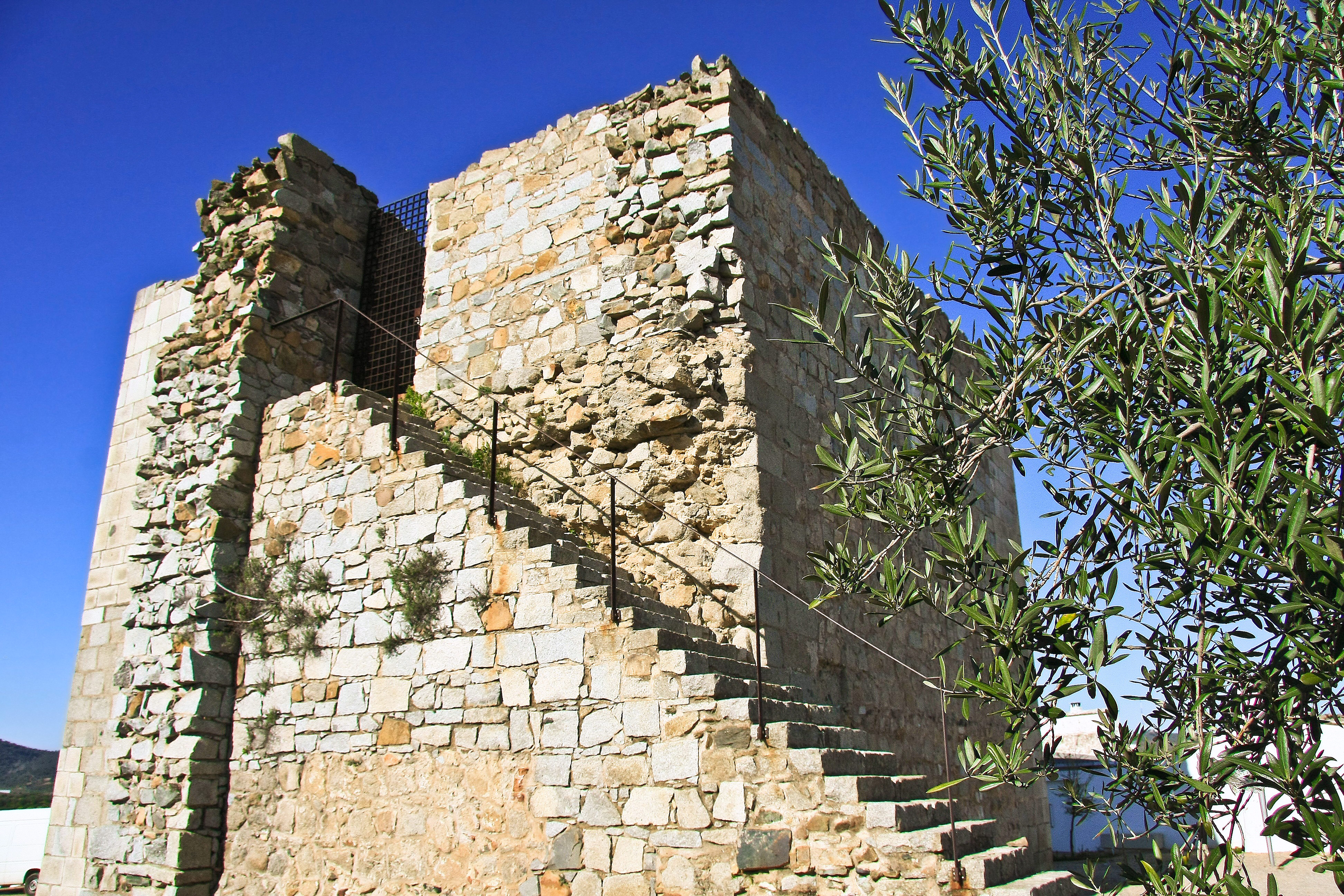

Site information
- Type: Castle
- Owner: Portuguese Republic
- Operator: DRC Alentejo (Dispatch 829/2009; DR, Série 2/163, 24 August 2009
- Open to the public: Public

Location
- Coordinates: 38°12′46.69″N 7°48′8.15″W

Site history
- Built: 13th century
- Materials: Stone, Masonry

The Castle of Vidigueira is a castle in the civil parish of Vidigueira in the municipality of Vidigueira in the Portuguese subregion of Baixo Alentejo. Although constructed in the first half of the 15th century, it is more commonly associated with the first of the Counts of Vidigueira: Vasco da Gama.

== History ==
The first Donatary of Vidigueira and castle was Mestre Tomé, treasurer of the Sé Cathedral of Braga during the reign of Afonso III of Portugal, making the construction of the castle part of the repopulation strategy of the 13th century. Mestre Tomé, sometime supplier for the old Matriz church of the settlement, erected and reinforced the castle as a bastion of the defense line of the Guadiana, an important line between Portugal and Castile. A few decades later, at the beginning of the 14th century, King Denis recovered the village of Vidigueira for the Crown of Portugal. In 1385 King John I offered Vidigueira to his constable, Nuno Álvares Pereira. Through his daughter's (D. Beatriz Pereira Alvim) marriage, with D. Afonso, Count of Barcelos and first Duke of Braganza, the castle and courtyard in Vidigueira passed into the possession of the House of Braganza, one of the more opulent in the kingdom.

The fortified rectangular tower, which today can still be appreciated, albeit the state of ruin, dates from the signeurial holdings of Fernando I, Duke of Braganza, in the first half of the 15th Century. With the confiscation of the properties and possessions of the House of Braganza, in 1483, the holdings were re-obtained by the Crown of Portugal, until its annulment in 1500, by Manuel I of Portugal. King Manuel, at that time, signed a foral for the town of Vidigueira, around 1512. But, little time passed, before the same monarch conceded to Vasco da Gama, then Admiral of India, the title of first Count of Vidigueira, compensating the navigator for his adventures.

Once again, the castle left the possession of the House of Braganza; on 7 November 1519, the Braganzas signed a contract to sell and renounce these possessions, in favor of Vasco Da Gama. From Évora the Palace of Vidigueira was transferred, including the not only the palace annex and fortifications. Of this palace, which was an important structure, nothing remains of this structure, except the Manueline window, brought from the Vila de Frades, a possession of the Counts of Vidigueira at the time.

On 1 June 1992, the structure was transferred into the possession of the Instituto Português do Património Arquitectónico (IPPAR) (by Decree 106F/92).

== Architecture ==
The castle is located in an urban context, isolated on a plateau. It is situated on the western side of the town, within the urban area, with several buildings/structures surrounding it. Alongside the tower is a Manueline window brought from Vila de Frades, which was judged to have been from the Palace of the Counts of Vidigueira.

A rectangular tower, the castle is a vertical block, with little ornamentation such as merlons. The tower that remains, known as the Atalaia das Vidigueiras, is a soft construction, regularly built, and altered with successive interventions. In a state of partial ruin, there are no coverings to protect what remains, nor merlons to crown the parapets. To the southwest is the beginnings of a wall, today transformed into a staircase, for access to the structure. In the southeast, is a sculpted stone with the coat-of-arms of the Counts of Vidigueira. The coat of arms includes a shield in the centre, with five smaller shields placed in a cruciform.
