= Cathedral of Miranda do Douro =

Cathedral in Miranda do Douro, Portugal

Coordinates: 41.4933°N 6.2735°W

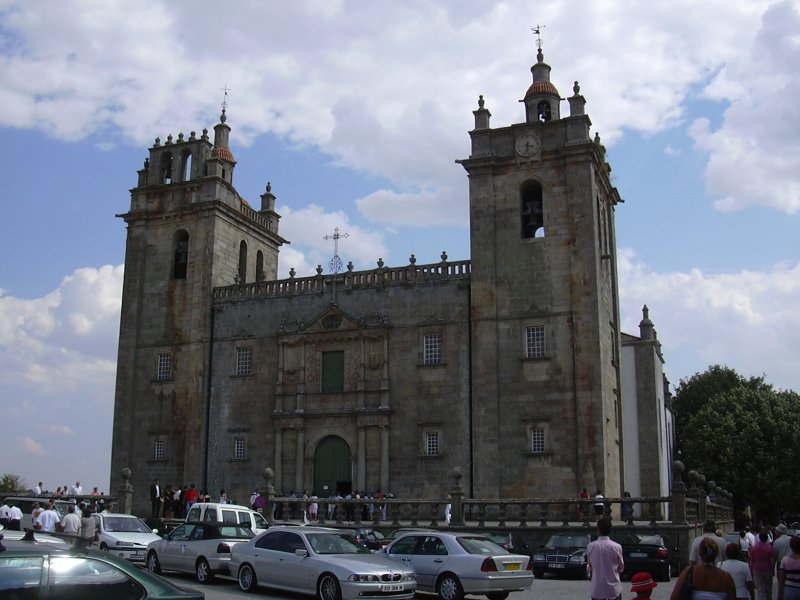

The Cathedral of Miranda do Douro (Portuguese: Sé de Miranda do Douro, Mirandese: Sé de Miranda de l Douro) is a Roman Catholic cathedral in Miranda do Douro, Portugal. It is the co-cathedral of the Diocese of Bragança-Miranda, which has its see in the Cathedral of Braganza.

Work on the cathedral began on 24 May 1552. Confirmation of its completion was sent to Pope Paul V in 1609. In 1770 the see was moved to Braganza by Pope Clement XIV and the Cathedral of Miranda do Douro became the co-cathedral.

Since 16 June 1910, the cathedral is protected as one of the National monuments of Portugal.
