= Francisco Maria da Silva =

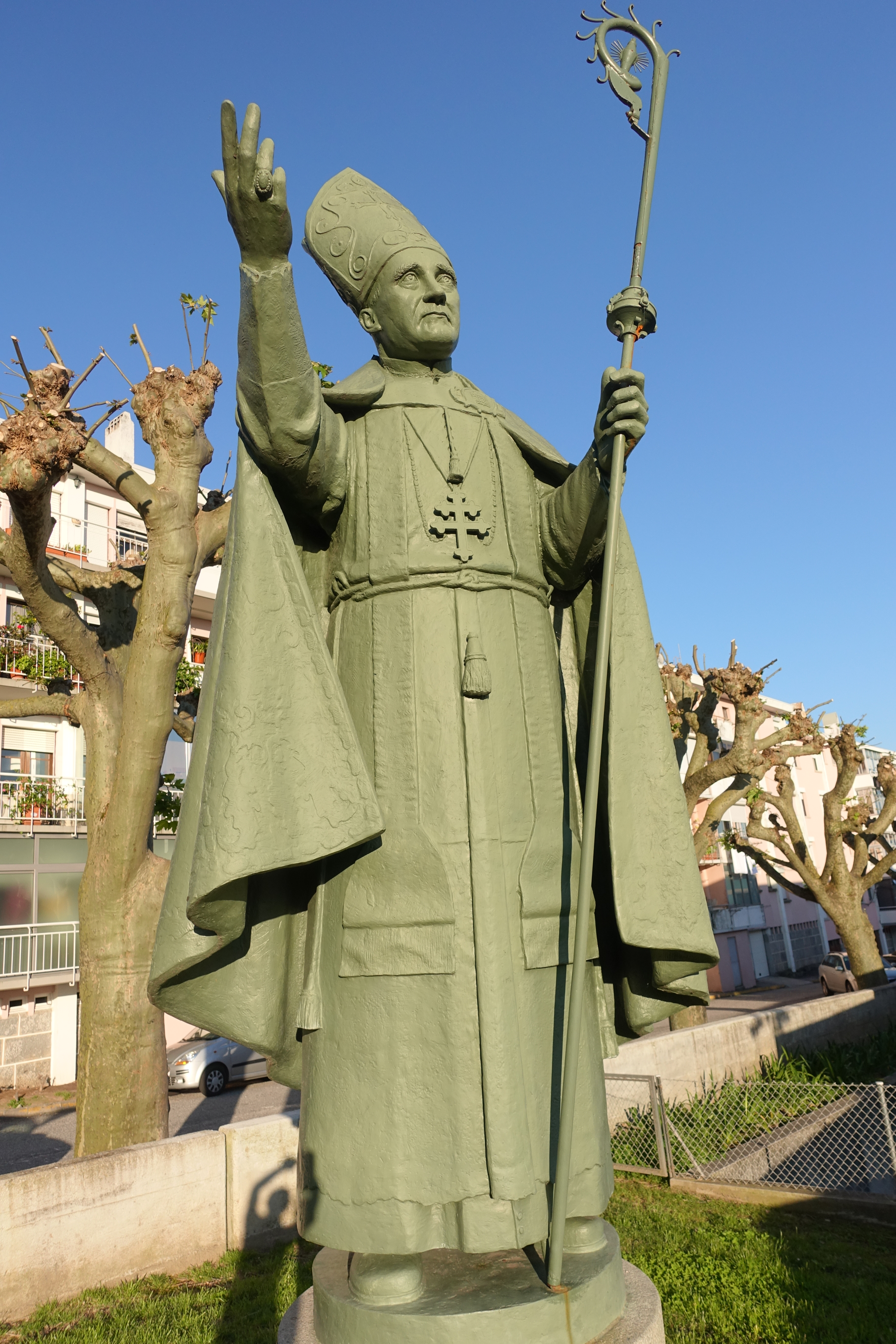
Statue of Francisco Maria da Silva in Braga, Portugal. Sculpture by Rogério de Azevedo

Francisco Maria da Silva (15 March 1910 – 14 April 1977) was a Portuguese prelate of the Roman Catholic Church. He served as Archbishop-Primate of Braga from 1963 until his death.

== Biography ==
Francisco da Silva was born in Murtosa, and was ordained to the priesthood on May 21, 1932. On December 20, 1956, he was appointed Auxiliary Bishop of Braga and Titular Bishop of Telmissus by Pope Pius XII. He received his episcopal consecration on March 31, 1957, from Archbishop Antonio Martins Júnior, with Archbishop Manuel Ferreira da Silva and Bishop José Dias serving as co-consecrators.

Silva attended the Second Vatican Council from 1962 to 1965, and was named Archbishop of Braga on December 12, 1963.

== Warm summer ==
On August 10, 1975, the archbishop delivered a speech in which he gave a scathing condemnation of communism, as well as demanding that the Portuguese Communist Party relinquish its take over of the Catholic-owned Radio Renascença, saying, "We want respect for public morality and moral values ... for fundamental human rights. Christian people must assume their responsibilities, certain that the best values guide their lives: God, his church, and the homeland". After the speech, thousands of his audience desecrated a flag torn down from Communist Party headquarters, and were fired upon.

Francisco died at the age of 67, having served as archbishop for twenty-one years.

Preceded by Antonio Martins Júnior	Archbishop of Braga; 1956–1977	Succeeded by Eurico Dias Nogueira
