= Ex officio member =

Membership by virtue of holding a specific other position

An ex officio member is a member of a body (notably a board, committee, or council) who is part of it by virtue of holding another office. The term ex officio is Latin, meaning literally 'from the office', and the sense intended is 'by right of office'; its use dates back to the Roman Republic.

According to Robert's Rules of Order, the term denotes only how one becomes a member of a body. Accordingly, the rights of an ex officio member are exactly the same as other members unless otherwise stated in regulations or bylaws. It relates to the notion that the position refers to the position the ex officio holds, rather than the individual that holds the position. In some groups, ex officio members may frequently abstain from voting.

Opposite notions are dual mandate, when the same person happens to hold two offices or more, although these offices are not in themselves associated; and personal union, when two states share the same monarch.

== For profit and nonprofit use ==
Any ex officio membership (for example, of committees, or of the board) is as defined by the nonprofit association's bylaws or other documents of authority. For example, the bylaws quite often provide that the organization's president will be ex officio a member of all committees, except the nominating committee.

== Political offices ==
=== Andorra ===
The Catholic bishop of Urgell and the president of France are ex officio co-princes of Andorra.

=== Australia ===
Within the Australian political system, the Liberal–National Coalition is an alliance of centre-right political parties that forms one of the two major groupings in Australian federal politics. The two major partners in the Coalition are the Liberal Party of Australia and the National Party of Australia with each partner being a stand-alone organisation that elects its own leadership. The leader of the Liberals generally serves as the ex officio Leader of the Coalition whereas the leader of the Nationals serves as the ex officio Deputy Leader of the Coalition.

In the above arrangement, when a Coalition is elected to government in Australia or the countries States or territories, convention is that the larger partner, usually the Liberals, hold the office of Prime Minister, Premier or Chief Minister whereas the smaller partner, usually the Nationals, hold office as the Deputy Prime Minister or Deputy Premier. The respective offices are determined based on the size of the respective alliance partner and their independently of one another chosen leader.

The Coalition generally results in the Prime Minister or Premier from the respective jurisdiction being from a metropolitan area (the Liberals) and guarantees a rural or regional Deputy Prime Minister or Premier (from the Nationals). The Leader of the Nationals is usually given the right to choose his or her ministry within government by virtue of being the second-most senior position within the Coalition partnership.

=== Botswana ===
In Botswana's unicameral National Assembly, the president of Botswana and the Speaker of the National Assembly serve as the chamber's two ex-officio members.

=== Brazil ===
In the Empire of Brazil, some princes became members by right of the Imperial Senate once they turned 25. From 1891 to 1930 and from 1946 to 1963, the Vice President of Brazil also had served as an ex officio President of the Federal Senate. In the current Constitution of Brazil, the President of the Federal Senate is an ex officio president of the National Congress, even though this office does not exist officially.

=== Canada ===
Judges of the Federal Court are ex officio members of the Federal Court of Appeal, and vice versa.

=== China ===
The General Secretary of the Chinese Communist Party is an ex officio member of the Politburo Standing Committee which is the top decision-making body in the Chinese Communist Party (CCP). The CCP General Secretary has also been the ex officio Chairman of the CCP Central Military Commission since 1989.

==== Hong Kong ====
As of 20 January 2026, the Executive Council of Hong Kong is still composed of ex officio members (official members since 1997) and unofficial members (non-official members since 1997). By practice the ex officio members include the secretaries of departments, i.e. the Chief Secretary, the Financial Secretary and the Secretary for Justice. Since 2002 all secretaries of bureaux are also appointed by the Chief Executive to be official members of the Executive Council. But since 2005 the secretaries of bureaux attend only when items on the agenda concern their portfolios.

=== France ===
Former presidents are ex officio members for life of the Constitutional Council.

=== India ===
The Vice-President of India is ex officio chairman of the Indian parliament's upper house, the Rajya Sabha.

The NITI Aayog think tank comprises five ex officio members, including the Prime Minister, who serves as its chairman. Other ex officio members are the Minister of Home Affairs, the Minister of Finance, the Minister of Railways, and the Minister of Agriculture and Farmers' Welfare.

=== Italy ===
Former presidents are ex officio members for life of the Senate.

=== North Korea ===
The General Secretary of the Workers' Party of Korea is an ex officio member of the Presidium of the Politburo, which is the top decision-making body in the Workers' Party of Korea (WPK). The WPK General Secretary is also the ex officio Chairman of the WPK Central Military Commission.

=== Philippines ===
In Congress, the presiding officers and their deputies, and the majority and minority leaders, are ex officio members of all committees. The chairman on each chamber's committee on rules is the majority leader. The Senate President is the ex officio chairman of the Commission on Appointments, but can only vote on ties. In the Judicial and Bar Council, several positions are due to occupying another office.

In provincial boards, the provincial presidents of the League of Barangays (villages), Sangguniang Kabataan (youth councils) and of the Philippine Councilors League sit as ex officio board members. In city and municipal councils, the city and municipal presidents of the League of Barangays and the youth councils sit as ex officio councilors. In barangays, the youth council chairman is an ex officio member of the barangay council. The ex officio members have the same rights and privileges as the regular members of each legislature. The deputies of local chief executives (vice governors and vice mayors) are ex officio presiding officers of their respective legislatures, but can only vote when there is a tie.

=== Russia ===
The prime minister, leaders of the State Duma and Federation Council, chief of staff and heads of federal subjects are ex officio members of the State Council, an advisory body to the president, who serves as its chairperson.

The president is also ex officio chairman of the Security Council.

=== United Kingdom ===
==== House of Lords ====
In the House of Lords, the bishops of the five Great Sees of Canterbury, York, London, Durham, and Winchester are ex officio members, and are entitled to vote just as any other Lord Spiritual.

Formerly, anyone holding a title in the Peerage of the United Kingdom was ex officio a member of the House of Lords. This entitlement was abolished in 1999. Since then, only the Earl Marshal and the Lord Great Chamberlain (offices that are themselves hereditary) remain ex officio; another 90 hereditary peers are elected by and from among those eligible.

==== Prime ministers ====
The prime minister of the United Kingdom is ex officio the First Lord of the Treasury.

==== Scotland ====
The Lord President of the Court of Session is by virtue of office appointed as Lord Justice General of Scotland. As such, they are both head of the judiciary of Scotland, president of the Court of Session (the most senior civil court in Scotland), and president of the High Court of Justiciary (the most senior criminal court in Scotland).

=== United States ===
==== Federal government ====
The vice president of the United States is ex officio the president of the Senate. This gives them a tie-breaking vote in the Senate on matters decided by a majority vote (as opposed to a three-fifths vote or two-thirds vote), if the votes for passage and rejection are equally divided. The Democratic and Republican leaders of both houses are ex officio members of the House and Senate intelligence committees. Many committee chairs in the House of Representatives are ex officio members of subcommittees.

==== State governments ====
Like the Vice President, many states with lieutenant governors serve as president of the state senates.

==== Colorado ====
In most Colorado counties, the county sheriff is elected by the citizens of the county. However, in the City and County of Denver, the mayor of Denver appoints a "Manager of Safety" who oversees the Department of Safety (including the Fire, Police, and Sheriff Departments) and is the ex officio sheriff of the jurisdiction. Similarly, in the City and County of Broomfield, Colorado, near Denver, the police chief (an appointed position) also acts ex officio as the county sheriff.

==== New York City ====
The Speaker of the New York City Council, and its Majority and Minority Leaders, are all ex officio members of each of its committees. Furthermore, each member of the Council is a non-voting ex officio member of each community board whose boundaries include any of the council member's constituents.

=== Vietnam ===
The General Secretary of the Communist Party of Vietnam is ex officio the Secretary of the Central Military Commission, making the officeholder de facto commander-in-chief of the People's Army of Vietnam.

== Other examples ==
The bishop of Coimbra, a Catholic diocese in Portugal, is ex officio entitled to the countship of Arganil, a title they have never renounced after Portugal became a republic.
