= Centro Hospitalar de Coimbra =

Geography
- Location: Coimbra, Portugal
- Coordinates: 40.225004°N 8.413788°W

Organisation
- Type: General

Links
- Lists: Hospitals in Portugal

The Centro Hospitalar de Coimbra is a hospital centre in Coimbra, Portugal. This complex has a broad range of clinical services and medical specialties distributed across three main hospitals: Hospital Geral (General Hospital), also known as Hospital dos Covões, Maternidade Bissaya Barreto (Maternity) and Hospital Pediátrico (Pediatric Hospital). It is a branch of the larger Centro Hospitalar e Universitário de Coimbra, a merged institution created during the eruption of the European sovereign debt crisis and the Portuguese economic and financial crisis in 2012, that reorganized both the Centro and the Coimbra University Hospitals.

== See also ==
- Coimbra
