= Miguel da Anunciação =

18th-century Portuguese Catholic bishop

- Bishop of Diocese of Coimbra
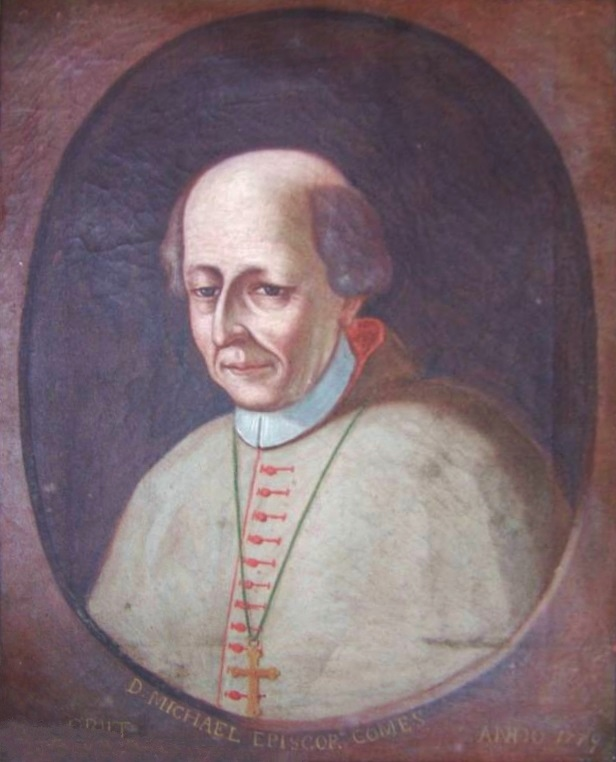
- Church: Roman Catholic Church
- Diocese: Diocese of Coimbra
- In office: 1740-1779
- Predecessor: António Vasconcelos e Sousa
- Successor: Francisco de Lemos
- Previous posts: Prior General, University Administrator

Orders
- Ordination: 26 June 1729 by Luis Simoes Brandao, Bishop of Angola
- Consecration: 9 April 1740 by Valerio do Sacramento
- Rank: Bishop of Angola

Personal details
- Born: February 1704 Lisbon, Portugal
- Died: 29 August 1779 (aged 75) Coimbra, Portugal

Miguel da Anunciação (da Cunha) (1704 – 29 August 1779) was a Portuguese prelate of the Roman Catholic Church. He won notoriety as an opponent of the Enlightenment and of Sebastião José de Carvalho e Melo, 1st Marquis of Pombal, for which he spent eight years in prison.

== Biography ==
Miguel Carlos da Cunha was the son of Tristan da Cunha de Ataide, Count of Povolide; his mother, Archangela Maria de Tavora, was the daughter of the Count of S. Vicente.

Anunciação became a doctor of Canon Law (Coimbra, 1725), where he lectured in Canon Law and eventually was elected Rector. He became a member of the Congregation of Hermits of Saint Augustine (O.E.S.A.) at the monastery of Santa Cruz in 1728, and was elected Prior General of his Order in 1737. He was ordained a priest on 26 June 1729 by Luis Simoēs Brandão, Bishop of Angola.

Anunciação was nominated Bishop of Coimbra by the King on 22 February 1739, and approved by Pope Benedict XIV on 19 December 1740. He was consecrated bishop on 9 April 1740, in the church of the monastery of Santa Cruz, by the Bishop of Angola, Valerio do Sacramento, O.E.S.A., assisted by the Bishop of Macao, Hilario de Santa Rosa, and the Bishop of Funchal, Jose do Nascimento. He made his entry into his diocese on 11 June 1740. He founded the diocesan seminary of Coimbra in June 1741.

On 8 November 1768 Anunciação issued a pastoral letter, condemning a number of books of Enlightenment doctrine. Among these were the Encyclopédie, works of Rousseau including the Social Contract, Justinus Febronius' De statu ecclesiae et legitima potestate Romani Pontificis, and Voltaire's La pucelle d'Orléans. His attack ran diametrically opposite to the policy of Pombal, to modernize the educational system in Portugal to bring it into line with the more modern teaching of other institutions in Europe. The University of Coimbra's curriculum was more than two centuries out-of-date, and in some ways still medieval in character. The bishop was arrested, imprisoned and deposed by the Marques de Pombal. He spent eight years imprisoned in the fortress of Pedrouços.

To break Anunciação's connection with the diocese he was given, against his will, and initially against the will of Pope Clement XIV, a coadjutor bishop, Francisco de Lemos de Faria Pereira Coutinho, a follower of Pombal, who was confirmed on 13 April 1774. This gave De Lemos canonical rights to govern the diocese during Anunciação's years in prison, and to succeed him on his death on 29 August 1777.

== Bibliography ==
- Almeida, Fortunato de (1968), Peres, Damião (ed.). História da Igreja em Portugal. nova ed. Vol. II (Porto: Portucalense editora), pp. 608–618.
- Maxwell, Kenneth (1995). Pombal, Paradox of the Enlightenment. Cambridge University Press Archive. p. 95. ISBN 978-0-521-45044-7.
- Miller, Samuel J. (1978). Portugal and Rome C. 1748-1830: An Aspect of the Catholic Enlightenment. Rome: Pontifical Gregorian University. pp. 246–288. ISBN 978-88-7652-464-6.
- Rodrigues, M.A. (1982a), D. Miguel da Anunciação e o Cabido da Sé de Coimbra. Coimbra: Arquivo da Universidade de Coimbra.
- Rodrigues, M.A., "Pombal e D. Miguel da Anunciação bispo de Coimbra," Revista de História das Idéas 4 (1982), pp. 207–298.
