= Count of Arganil =

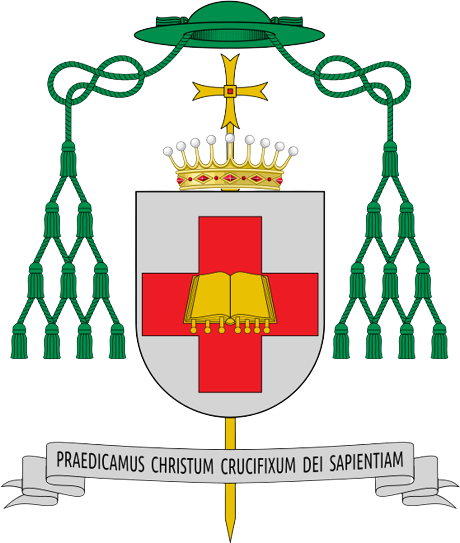
- Coat of Arms of the 30th, and current, Count of Arganil
- Creation date: 1472
- Created by: Afonso V of Portugal
- Peerage: Peerage of Portugal
- First holder: João Galvão
- Present holder: Virgílio do Nascimento Antunes
- Remainder to: Bishop of Coimbra

Count of Arganil is a Portuguese noble title associated with the ecclesiastical position of Bishop of Coimbra. For this reason, its holders have always been designated Bishops-Counts since its concession.

The title of Count of Arganil was established by Letter of September 25, 1472 from King Afonso V in favor of the former 20th Prior-Major of the Monastery of Santa Cruz de Coimbra and 36th Bishop of Coimbra, D. João Galvão, as reward for his participation in the conquest of Asilah and Tangier. This 1st Count of Arganil, in a provision dated November 25, 1471, signed as Count of Santa Comba, which suggests that he had previously had that title granted and the Letter of September 25, 1472 was merely the change, despite the fact that, to date, no conclusive proof of this concession has been found in the chancelleries. Afonso Álvares Nogueira, who translated the letter granting this title, adds: And even though before this some prelates of this country were called Counts of Santa Comba, it was by private mercy of the Kings but not de jure As they are now called Counts of Arganil.

From then on, all his successors in the Coimbra cathedral used this noble title, being known and designated, in short, as "bishop-counts".

In the middle of the 20th century, Bishop Ernesto Sena de Oliveira stopped using it and, since that date, the successive counts of Arganil have not used this title either, although they have never abdicated it.

== List of Bishops-Counts ==
1. João (VI) Galvão (1460–1481)
2. Jorge (II) de Almeida (1481–1543)
3. Fr. João (VII) Soares (1545–1572)
4. Fr Manuel (I) de Meneses (1573–1578)
5. Fr. Gaspar do Casal (1579–1584)
6. Afonso (III) de Castelo-Branco (1585–1615)
7. Afonso (IV) Furtado de Mendonça (1616–1618)
8. Martim Afonso Mexia (1619–1623)
9. João (VIII) Manuel (1625–1633)
10. Jorge (III) de Melo (1636–1638)
11. Joane Mendes de Távora (1638–1646])
12. Manuel de Noronha (1670–1671)
13. Frei Álvaro (II) de São Boaventura (1672–1683)
14. João (IX) de Melo (1684–1704)
15. António (I) Vasconcelos e Sousa (1706–1716)
16. Miguel (II) da Anunciação (1740–1779)
17. Francisco (I) de Lemos de Faria Pereira Coutinho (1779–1822)
18. Fr. Francisco (II) de São Luís Saraiva (1822–1824)
19. Fr. Joaquim de Nossa Senhora da Nazaré (1824–1851)
20. Manuel (II) Bento Rodrigues da Silva (1851–1858)
21. José Manuel de Lemos (1858–1870)
22. Manuel (III) Correia de Bastos Pina (1872–1913)

After the imposition of the Republic in Portugal and with the end of the nobility system, the claimants to the title were:

1. Manuel (IV) Luís Coelho da Silva (1913–1936)
2. António (II) Antunes (1936–1948)
3. Ernesto (I) Sena de Oliveira (1948–1967) ,
4. Francisco (III) Fernandes Rendeiro (1967–1971)
5. João António (I) da Silva Saraiva (1971–1976)
6. João (X) Alves (1976–2001)
7. Albino (I) Mamede Cleto (2001–2011)
8. Virgílio (I) do Nascimento Antunes (2011–).
