= Centro Hospitalar e Universitário de Coimbra =

The Centro Hospitalar e Universitário de Coimbra (C.H.U.C) is a Portuguese public healthcare complex located in Coimbra, Portugal. It is composed by 6 medical institutions: Hospital da Universidade (the original University Hospital), Hospital Pediátrico de Coimbra (Pediatric Hospital), Hospital dos Covões, Maternidade Dr. Bissaya Barreto (maternity), Maternidade Dr. Daniel de Matos (maternity) and Hospital Sobral Cid (Psychiatrics Hospital). It's the biggest healthcare center in Portugal, with over 2000 beds and 8500 patients consulted per day.
