= Hospitais da Universidade de Coimbra =

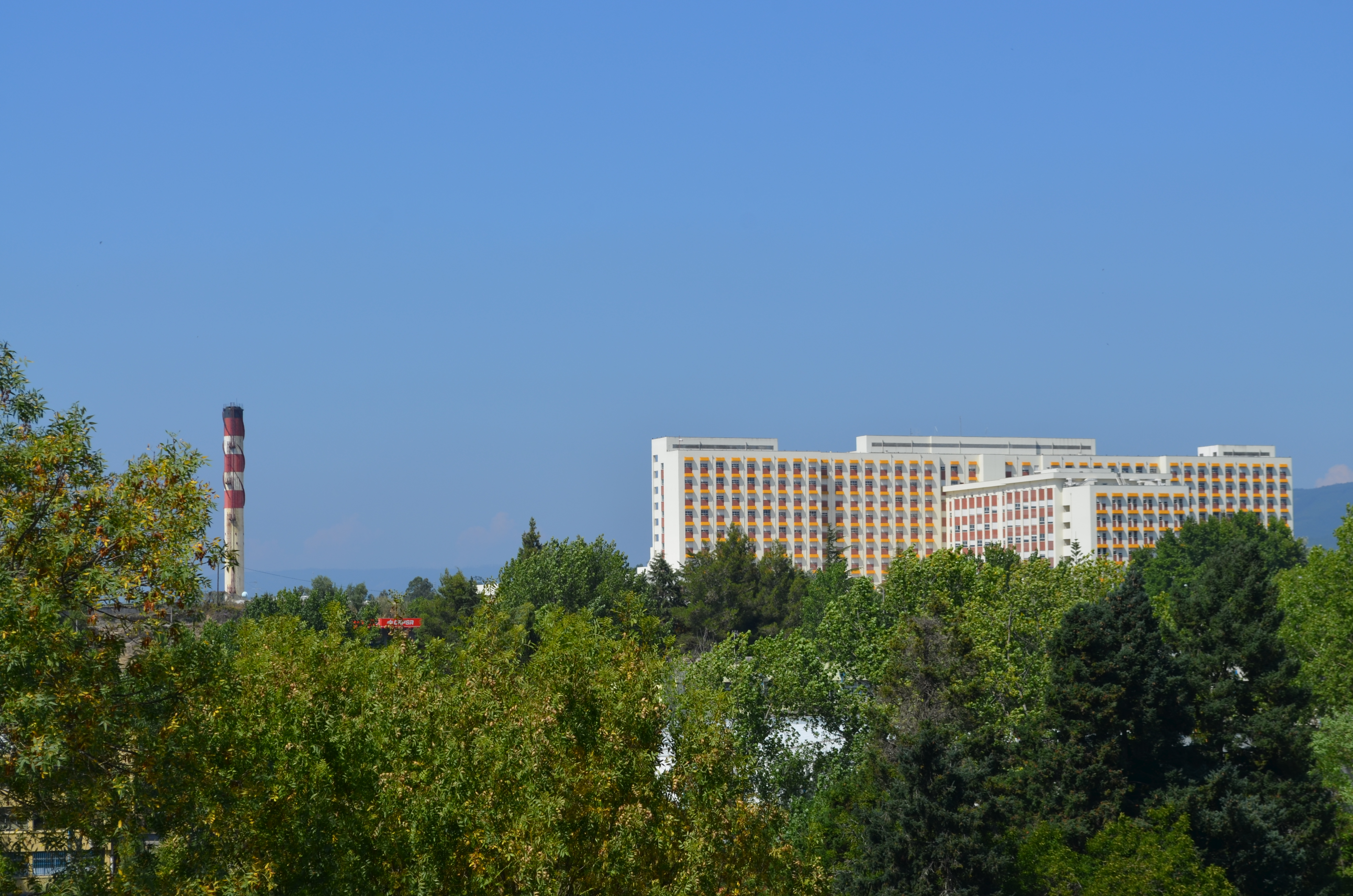
- Hospitais da Universidade de Coimbra - a view from the André de Gouveia street

Geography
- Location: Coimbra, Portugal
- Coordinates: 40.220907°N 8.413043°W

Organisation
- Affiliated university: University of Coimbra

History
- Opened: 16th Century
- Closed: 2012

Links
- Website: www.huc.min-saude.pt
- Lists: Hospitals in Portugal

The Hospitais da Universidade de Coimbra or HUC (Hospitals of the University of Coimbra), is a university hospital that partners with the University of Coimbra, Portugal. This complex is known as a centre of research with a broad range of clinical services and medical specialties. It is a branch of the larger Centro Hospitalar e Universitário de Coimbra, a rebranded merged institution created during the Euro area crisis and the Portuguese economic and financial crisis in 2012.

== History ==
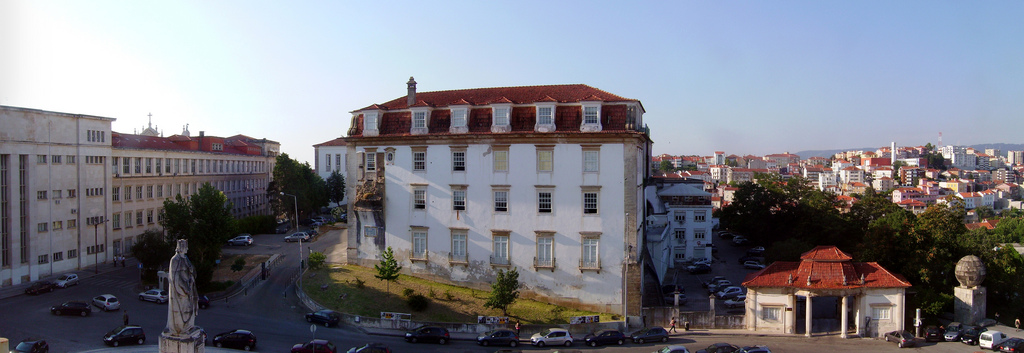
Colégio de São Jerónimo, today an ancient building in the oldest campus of the University of Coimbra (the monumental and touristic Pólo I), was the former building of the Coimbra University Hospitals until the 1980s.

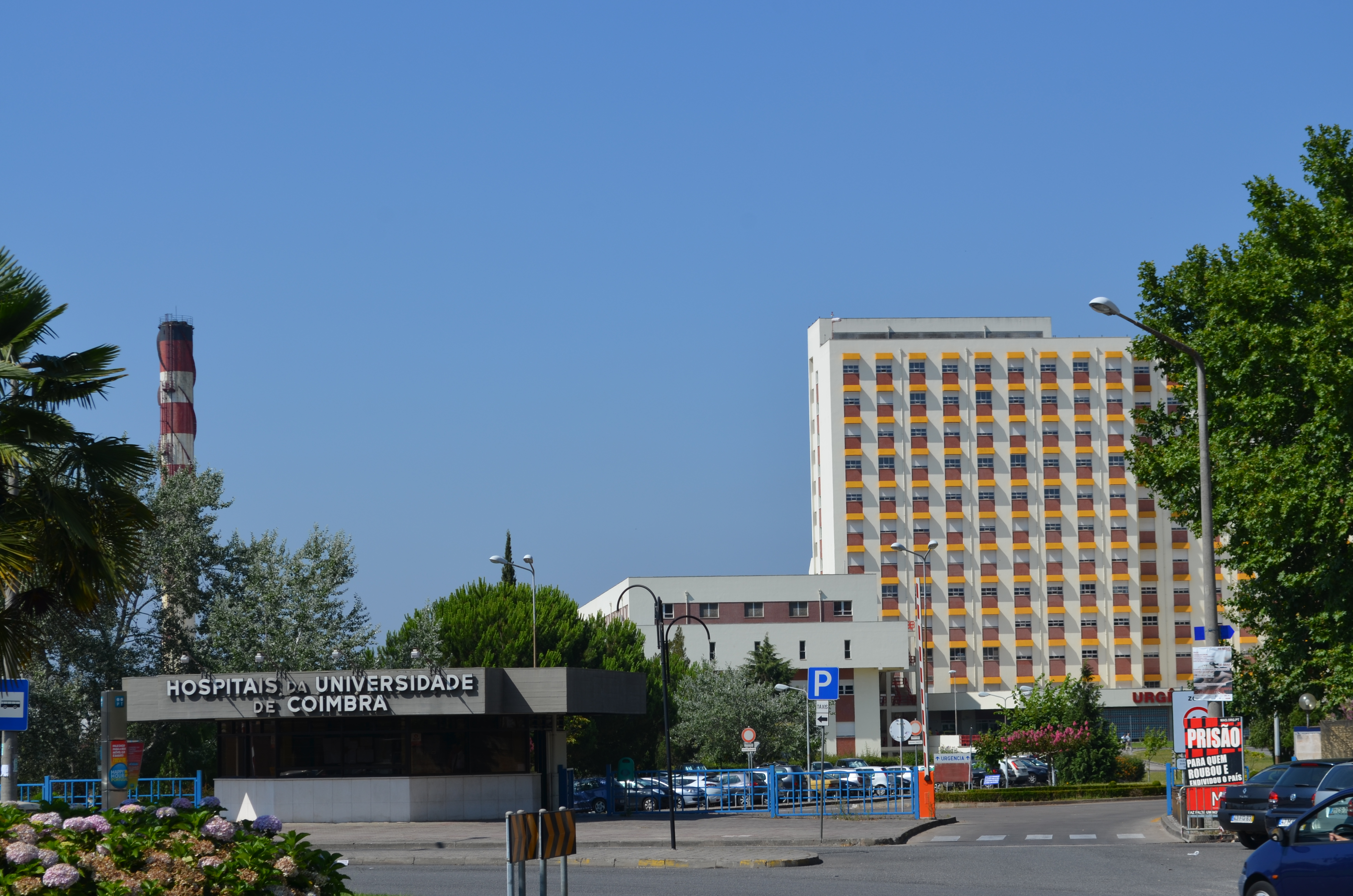
Hospitais da Universidade de Coimbra - main entrance.

In its early days, it used to function in two separated buildings which can be traced back to the 16th century. Part belonged to the College of St. Jerome begun in the 1560s. In 1836 it was handed over to the University of Coimbra, and twelve years later several hospital departments were transferred there. From then on it was known as the Hospital of St. Jerome. Several features bear witness to its history: the gateway built in the middle of the 18th century, which used to serve as the main entrance to the hospital and the great staircase built soon afterwards, remarkable not only for the elegance of its lines but also for the tiles that make up the side panel containing a variety of scenes set in a Rococo moulding.

The second building is the Royal College of Arts, which belonged to the Society of Jesus and was begun in 1568. The Coimbra High School was installed in this building in 1836 but in 1853 some hospital departments were transferred here. From 1870 onwards it was entirely given over to the hospital. In the late 1980s, these two old buildings were abandoned by the HUC services and are now patrimony of the University of Coimbra.

During the twentieth century, under the Estado Novo regime, and beginning in 1945, Decree-Law no. 35,108 reclassified the Hospitais da Universidade de Coimbra as special bodies for health and welfare. They were thereby granted technical and administrative autonomy and authorized to receive subsidies as well as to accept inheritances, bequests, or donations. Likewise, their administration could be entrusted to welfare institutions of either a secular or religious character.

Nowadays the main centre of HUC operates in its own building, inaugurated in 1987 in Celas area of Coimbra. There are many other buildings of this hospital, dispersed around a large area in Coimbra, forming a huge Medical Centre.

In 2012, due to the Euro area crisis and the Portuguese economic and financial crisis, the government merged the Coimbra University Hospitals with the Centro Hospitalar de Coimbra (C.H.C.) in order to reduce costs, fight overcapacity and unnecessary redundancy and create economic synergies for the state run hospitals operating in Coimbra.

The rebranded merged institution was then renamed C.H.U.C. - Centro Hospitalar Universitário de Coimbra.

== See also ==
- Universidade de Coimbra
- Coimbra
