= Our Lady Queen Cathedral, Bragança =

Coordinates: 41.8057°N 6.7625°W

Our Lady Queen Cathedral
- Catedral de Nossa Senhora Rainha
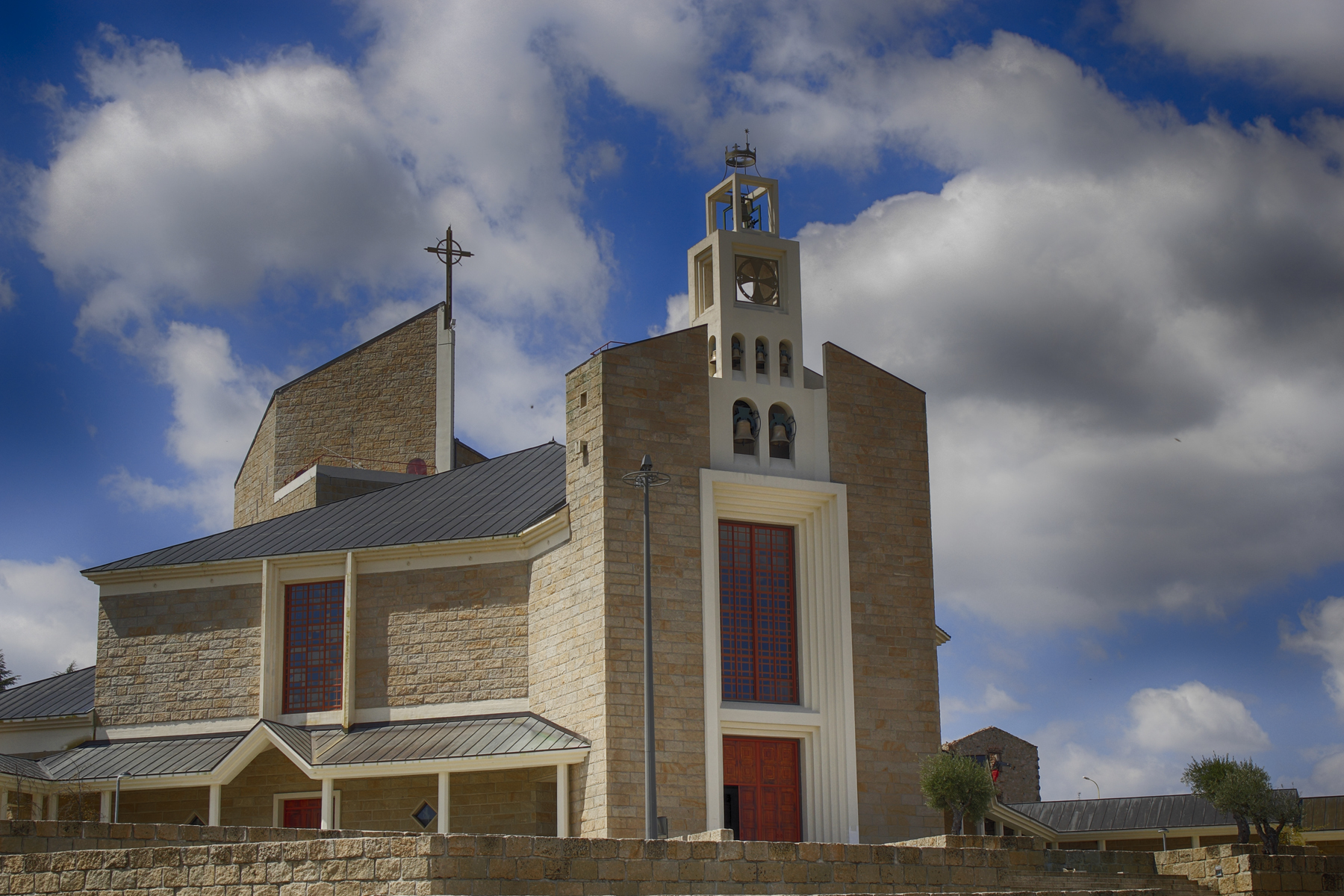
- Our Lady Queen Cathedral
- Location: Bragança
- Country: Portugal
- Denomination: Roman Catholic Church

The Our Lady Queen Cathedral (Portuguese: Catedral de Nossa Senhora Rainha; Sé Catedral de Bragança), also called New Cathedral of Bragança, is a religious building of the Catholic Church that serves as the seat of the diocese of Bragança-Miranda in northeastern Portugal.

The temple was inaugurated on October 7, 2001 as the first Portuguese cathedral built in the 21st century. It was designed by architect Rosa Vassal in a total space of 10,000 square meters.

It was consecrated to the Virgin by Bishop Antonio Rafael.

== See also ==
- Roman Catholicism in Portugal
