= Jorge Ortiga =

Dom, His Most Reverend Excellency Jorge Ortiga GCIH
- Archbishop Emeritus of Braga; Primate Emeritus of the Spains
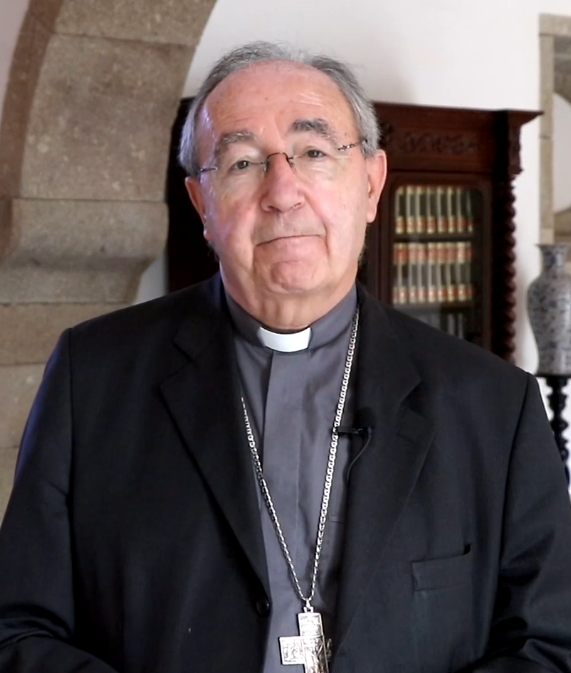
- Church: Roman Catholic Church
- Archdiocese: Braga
- See: Braga
- Appointed: 5 June 1999
- Installed: 18 July 1999
- Predecessor: Eurico Dias Nogueira
- Previous posts: Auxiliary Bishop of Braga (1987–99); Titular Bishop of Nova Barbara (1987–99); President of the Portuguese Episcopal Conference (2005–11)

Orders
- Ordination: 9 July 1967
- Consecration: 3 January 1988 by Eurico Dias Nogueira

Personal details
- Born: Jorge Ferreira da Costa Ortiga; 5 March 1944 (age 82) Brufe, Vila Nova de Famalicão Municipality, Portugal
- Education: Pontifical Gregorian University
- Motto: Ut unum sint
- Coat of arms

Jorge Ferreira da Costa Ortiga GCIH (born 5 March 1944) is a Portuguese prelate of the Catholic Church. He was Archbishop-Primate of Braga from 1999 to 2021.

== Biography ==
He was born in the Brufe neighborhood of Vila Nova de Famalicão Municipality, on 5 March 1944. He attended the seminary of the Archdiocese of Braga between 1955 and 1967. He was ordained a priest on 9 July 1967. He was Vicar Cooperator in the parish of St. Victor in Braga from 1967 to 1968.

He graduated from the Faculty of Ecclesiastical History at the Pontifical Gregorian University in Rome on 10 October 1970, later attending the curriculum for the doctoral degree. He also took courses in priestly spirituality in Grottaferrata in 1970–1971 run by the Institute Mystici Corporis.

In Braga, he worked in the Secretariat of Bishops from June 1971 to September 1973 while also fulfilling a pastoral assignment at the Third Church in Braga. On 1 October 1973 he was appointed Rector of the Church Gathered and Chaplain of the Brotherhood of Our Lady of Sorrows and St Anne in that parish. On 24 November 1981, he was appointed Episcopal Vicar for Clergy, an office which was reconfirmed on 1 October 1985. On 6 March 1985 he was named Canon of the Cathedral of Braga.

On 9 November 1987, Pope John Paul II named him Titular Bishop of Braga Novabárbara and Auxiliary Bishop of Braga. He received his episcopal ordination in the Crypt of the Basilica Sameiro on 3 January 1988.

On 5 June 1999 John Paul appointed him Archbishop of Braga. He was installed on 18 July 1999. In the Conciliar Seminary of Braga (later School of Theology Faculty of Theology and now-Braga) he taught Historical Studies, History of Religions and Church History.

He was responsible for the Archdiocesan Secretariat for Vocations and President of the Institute of History and Religious Art. He chaired the General Secretariat of the 40th Diocesan Synod and coordinated the Diocesan Pastoral Secretariat. He is Chairman of the Board of the Diocesan Office of Clergy Support (IDAC). He is President of the General Assembly of the Association "Give Your Hands."

In the Portuguese Episcopal Conference (CEP), he chaired the Episcopal Commission for the Doctrine of the Faith and belonged to the Episcopal Commission of Christian Education. He was President of the CEP from 2005 to 2011.

His full title, rarely used, is:

His Most Reverend Excellency Dom Jorge Ortiga, By the Grace of God and the Holy Apostolic See, Archbishop of Braga and Primate of the Spains. (Note: In Portuguese: "Sua Excelência Reverendíssima D. Jorge Ortiga, Por Mercê de Deus e da Santa Sé Apostólica, Arcebispo de Braga e Primaz das Espanhas.")

Pope Francis accepted his resignation on 3 December 2021.

== Honours ==
- Grand Cross of the Order of Prince Henry, Portugal (18 June 2012)
