= Diocese of Coimbra =

Roman Catholic diocese in Portugal

Coordinates: 40.2088°N 8.4271°W

Diocese of Coimbra Dioecesis Conimbricensis Diocese de Coimbra

Catholic
- New Cathedral of Coimbra

Location
- Country: Portugal
- Ecclesiastical province: Braga
- Metropolitan: Archdiocese of Braga

Statistics
- Area: 5,300 km^{2} (2,000 sq mi)
- Population: Total; Catholics: (as of 2016); 548,000 (est.); 500,000 (est.) (91.2%)
- Parishes: 269

Information
- Denomination: Catholic
- Sui iuris church: Latin Church
- Rite: Roman Rite
- Established: 563
- Cathedral: Cathedral of the Holy Name of Jesus in Coimbra
- Patron saint: St Augustine of Hippo
- Secular priests: 125 (diocesan); 35 (Religious Orders); 13 Permanent Deacons

Current leadership
- Pope: Leo XIV
- Bishop: Virgílio do Nascimento Antunes
- Metropolitan Archbishop: Jorge Ferreira da Costa Ortiga

Map
- Map showing the jurisdiction of Portuguese dioceses (Diocese of Coimbra is located at the bottom of the section coloured orange)

Website
- Website of the Diocese of Coimbra

The Diocese of Coimbra (Latin: Dioecesis Conimbricensis) is a Latin Church diocese of the Catholic Church in Coimbra, Portugal. It is a suffragan of the Archdiocese of Braga.

From 1472, the bishop of Coimbra held the comital title of Count of Arganil, being thus called Bishop-Count (Portuguese: Bispo-Conde).

== History ==
The first known bishop was Lucentius, who participated in the first council of Braga (563), the metropolitan See of Coimbra, until the latter was attached to the ecclesiastical province of Mérida (650–62). Titular bishops of Coimbra continued the succession under the Islamic conquest, one of whom witnessed the consecration of the church of Santiago de Compostela in 876.

The see was re-established in 1088, after the reconquest of the city of Coimbra by the Christian forces of Sisnando Davides (1064). The first bishop of the new series was Martin. In the midst of the difficulties of restoring the Church in Portugal in the wake of the request of the country from the Arabs, Bishop Mauricio Burdino applied to Pope Paschal II and obtained a bull Apostolicae Sedis (24 March 1101), assuring him of the possession of the old territory of his diocese, including parts which were once part of the diocese as they are reconquered from the Moors and the Arabs. He also assigned the bishop, for the time being, the territories of the vacant bishoprics of Lamego and Viseu, until such time as they could have their own bishops; and the territory and parishes of the Villa Vacaricia, which had been given by Count Raymond to the Diocese of Coimbra.

From 1139 Coimbra was the capital of the kingdom of Portugal and a principal beneficiary of the generosity of its kings, until the seat of government was moved to Lisbon in 1260. Among the more famous bishops have been Pedro (1300), chancellor of King Dinis; João Galvão, who was granted the title of Conde de Arganil for himself and his successors, on 25 September 1472 by King Alfonso V, in gratitude for his service in the conquest of Arzila and Tangier; and Manuel de Menezes (1573–78), former rector of the University of Coimbra from 1556 to 1560, who fell with King Sebastian in the Battle of Alcácer Quibir on 4 August 1578.

=== University of Coimbra ===
The University of Coimbra, the only university in Portugal until the 20th century, was founded in 1290, but in Lisbon, not in Coimbra. A papal bull was obtained from Pope Nicholas IV, and King Dinis I carried out the act of establishment. It was not until 1308 that the university was moved to Coimbra, due principally to the hostility of the people of Lisbon, though in 1338 it moved back. In 1354 the university returned to Coimbra, and in 1377 was established back in Lisbon. The university remained in Lisbon until King John III moved it back to Coimbra permanently in 1537. The involvement of the bishops of Coimbra in the affairs of the university was therefore intermittent and superficial, at least until the second half of the sixteenth century. Then they protected its medieval and Catholic character with zeal. One bishop, Miguel da Anunciação, spent eight years in prison for defying the efforts of the government to modernize the educational system of Portugal's university.

=== Cathedrals ===
The Old Cathedral of Coimbra, built in the first half of the 12th century, partly at the expense of Bishop Miguel and his chapter, is a remarkable monument of Romanesque architecture. The architect was Robert of Clermont. It was dedicated to the Assumption of the Body of the Virgin Mary into Heaven. The new cathedral, a Renaissance church built in 1580 as a church for its adjacent Jesuit college, is another important monument. The episcopal palace was built in the 18th century. The cathedral was administered by a chapter, whose eight dignities (not dignitaries) included: the dean, the cantor, the scholasticus, the treasurer, and the three archdeacons (Coimbra, Sena). There were twenty-one canons.

=== Monastery of Santa Cruz ===
The most important monastery in the diocese is Santa Cruz Monastery, founded in 1131 by Afonso Henriques, and for some time the most important in the kingdom by reason of its wealth and privileges. Its prior was authorized, or so it was claimed, by Anastasius IV and Celestine III to wear the episcopal insignia.

=== Academic Centre of Christian Democracy ===
The Academic Center of Christian Democracy is an association of Christian inspiration, belonging to the Diocese of Coimbra, which provides support to university students, who study in the University of Coimbra. The directorate of the association is composed almost entirely of tenured professors and doctors at the university. Notable members have included include António de Oliveira Salazar, Prime Minister (1932–1968) and dictator of Portugal.

== Bishops of Coimbra ==
=== to 1300 ===
- Paternus, O.S.B. (1082 – 21 March 1087)
- Martinus Simoens (1088–1091)
- Cresconius, O.S.B. (12 April 1092 – 22 June 1098)
- Mauricio Burdino, O.S.B. (1098–1111)
- Gondisalvus (Gonzalo) (c. 1111 – May 1125)
- Bernaldus, O.S.B. (1128–1147)
- João Anaia (1147–1158)
- Miguel Pais Salomão (1158–1176)
- Bermudo (1177 – 5 September 1182)
- Petrus (1182)
- Martinus (1183–1193)
- Petrus (1193–1232)
- Petrus (1232/33–1234)
- Tiburtius (27 May 1238 – 22 November 1246)
- Dominicus (1246–1247)
- Aegeas Fafas (15 December 1248 – 18 December 1267)

Sede vacante (1267–1279)

- Aimericus (9 January 1279 – 4 December 1295)
- Petrus Martini Collaço do Colimbria (9 August 1296 – 1301)

=== 1300 to 1700 ===
- Fernandus (27 August 1302 – 8 August 1303)
- Stephanus Annes de Brochardo (8 March 1307 – between June and September 1318)
- Raimundus (11 November 1318 – 15 July 1324)
- Raimundus Ebrardo (26 April 1325 – 1333)
- Joannes (23 August 1333 – 3 December 1337)
- Georgius Joannis (3 July 1338 – 1356)
- Lorenzo Rodriguez (23 May 1356 – 25 August 1358)
- Pedro Gomez Barroso (25 August 1358 – 23 July 1364)
- Vasco Fernandez (de Menezes) (23 July 1364 – 16 June 1371)
- Pedro Díaz de Tenorio (10 June 1371 – 13 January 1377)
- Martinho Perez de Charneca (1388 – 12 June 1398)
- Joannes de Azembuja (25 February 1399 – 29 May 1402)

Sede vacante (1402–1407)

Joannes, Archbishop of Compostella (1402–1403?) Administrator during the sede vacante

- Aegidius (5 April 1407 – 1418)
- Ferdinand Coutinho (27 April 1418 – ?)
- Alvaro Ferreira (21 October 1429 – 1444)
- Juan Roderici (27 September 1459 – 9 February 1469)
- João Galvão (9 February 1469 – 22 May 1482
- Jorge de Almeida (22 May 1482 – 25 July 1543)
- João Soares, O.E.S.A. (22 May 1545 – 26 November 1572)
- Manuel de Menezes (16 December 1573 – 4 August 1578)
- Gaspar do Casal, O.E.S.A. (27 November 1579 – 9 August 1584)
- Afonso de Castelo-Branco (3 June 1585 – 22 May 1615)
- Afonso Furtado de Mendonça (5 September 1616 – 12 November 1618)
- Martin Alphonso Mexia de Tovar (2 December 1619 – 30 August 1623)
- João Manuel de Ataíde (19 February 1625 – 24 November 1632)
- Jorge de Melo (9 June 1636 – 2 October 1636)
- João Mendes de Távora (22 Mar 1638 – 1 July 1646)
- Manuel de Noronha (15 December 1670 – 11 May 1671)
- Manuel de Noroña, O.F.M. (27 June 1672 – 19 January 1683)

=== since 1700 ===
- João de Melo (24 Apr 1684 – 28 Jun 1704)
- António Vasconcelos e Sousa (14 Dec 1705 – 23 Dec 1717)

Sede vacante (1717–1740)

- Miguel da Anunciação (da Cunha), O.E.S.A. (19 Dec 1740 – 29 Aug 1779)
- Francisco de Lemos de Faria Pereira Coutinho (29 Aug 1779 – 16 Apr 1822)
- Francisco de São Luiz (Manoel Justiniano) Saraiva, O.S.B. (19 Apr 1822 – 30 Apr 1824)
- Joaquim de Nossa Senhora de Nazareth Oliveira e Abreu, O.F.M.Ref. (3 May 1824 – 31 Aug 1851)
- Manuel Bento Rodrigues da Silva (15 Mar 1852 – 18 Mar 1858)
- José Manuel de Lemos (27 Sep 1858 – 26 Mar 1870)
- Manuel Correia de Bastos Pina (22 Dec 1871 – 19 Nov 1913)
- Manuel Luís Coelho da Silva (31 Oct 1914 – 1 Mar 1936)
- António Antunes (1 Mar 1936 – 20 Jul 1948)
- Ernesto Sena de Oliveira (29 Oct 1948 – 12 Aug 1967 Retired)
- Francisco Rendeiro, O.P. (12 Aug 1967 – 19 May 1971)
- João Antonio da Silva Saraiva (28 Jun 1972 – 3 Apr 1976)
- João Alves (8 Sep 1976 – 24 Mar 2001 Retired)
- Albino Mamede Cleto (24 Mar 2001 – 28 Apr 2011 Retired)
- Virgílio do Nascimento Antunes (28 Apr 2011 –)

== See also ==
- Coimbra history and timeline

== Bibliography ==
- Barbosa Morujao, María do Rosario, ed. (2010). Testamenta Ecclesiae portugaliae: (1071–1325) (in Portuguese and Latin). Lisbon: CEHR-UCP. pp. 229–443. ISBN 978-972-8361-31-0.
- Cunha, Maria Cristina, "Coimbra and Porto: Episcopacy and National Identity in Diocesan Border Quarrels," in: Herbers, Klaus & Frank Engel, ed. (2013). Das begrenzte Papsttum: Spielräume päpstlichen Handelns. Legaten – delegierte Richter – Grenzen. Berlin: De Gruyter. pp. 134–145. ISBN 978-3-11-030802-0.
- Defourneaux, Marcellin (1949). Les Français en Espagne aux XIe et XIIe siècles Paris: Presses Universitaires. [Mauricio Burdino]
- Florez, Henrique (1758). España sagrada (in Spanish). Vol. XIV. Madrid. pp. 71–101.
- Leitaõ Ferreira, Francisco. "Catalogo chronologico-critico dos Bispos de Coimbra," in: Collecciao dos Documentos, Estatutos, e Memorias da Academia Real da Historia Portugueza (in Portuguese). Vol. IV. Numero XVIII. Lisbon: P. da Sylva. 1724.
- Madahil, António Gomes da Rocha (1942). Livro das Vidas dos Bispos da Sé de Coimbra, Coimbra, 1942. (in Portuguese) [medieval source]
- Reilly, Bernard F. (1989). The Kingdom of León-Castilla under King Alfonso VI, 1065–1109. Princeton: Princeton University Press.

=== Episcopal lists ===
- Gams, Pius Bonifatius (1873). Series episcoporum Ecclesiae catholicae: quotquot innotuerunt a beato Petro apostolo. Ratisbon: Typis et Sumptibus Georgii Josephi Manz. (Use with caution; obsolete)
- Eubel, Conradus, ed. (1913). Hierarchia catholica, Tomus 1 (second ed.). Münster: Libreria Regensbergiana. (in Latin)
- Eubel, Conradus, ed. (1914). Hierarchia catholica, Tomus 2 (second ed.). Münster: Libreria Regensbergiana. (in Latin)
- Gulik, Guilelmus (1923). Eubel, Conradus (ed.). Hierarchia catholica, Tomus 3 (second ed.). Münster: Libreria Regensbergiana.
- Gauchat, Patritius (Patrice) (1935). Hierarchia catholica IV (1592–1667). Münster: Libraria Regensbergiana.
- Ritzler, Remigius; Sefrin, Pirminus (1952). Hierarchia catholica medii et recentis aevi. Vol. Quintum (V) (1667–1730). Patavii: Messagero di S. Antonio.
- Ritzler, Remigius; Sefrin, Pirminus (1958). Hierarchia catholica medii et recentis aevi. Vol. Sextum (VI) (1730–1799). Patavii: Messagero di S. Antonio.
- Ritzler, Remigius; Sefrin, Pirminus (1968). Hierarchia Catholica medii et recentioris aevi sive summorum pontificum, S. R. E. cardinalium, ecclesiarum antistitum series... A pontificatu Pii PP. VII (1800) usque ad pontificatum Gregorii PP. XVI (1846) (in Latin). Vol. VII. Monasterii: Libr. Regensburgiana.
- Ritzler, Remigius; Pirminus Sefrin (1978). Hierarchia catholica Medii et recentioris aevi... A Pontificatu PII PP. IX (1846) usque ad Pontificatum Leonis PP. XIII (1903) (in Latin). Vol. VIII. Il Messaggero di S. Antonio.
- Pięta, Zenon (2002). Hierarchia catholica medii et recentioris aevi... A pontificatu Pii PP. X (1903) usque ad pontificatum Benedictii PP. XV (1922) (in Latin). Vol. IX. Padua: Messagero di San Antonio. ISBN 978-88-250-1000-8.
