= Archdiocese of Braga =

Roman Catholic archdiocese in Portugal

Coordinates: 41.5497°N 8.4269°W

Archdiocese of Braga Archidioecesis Bracarensis Arquidiocese de Braga

Catholic
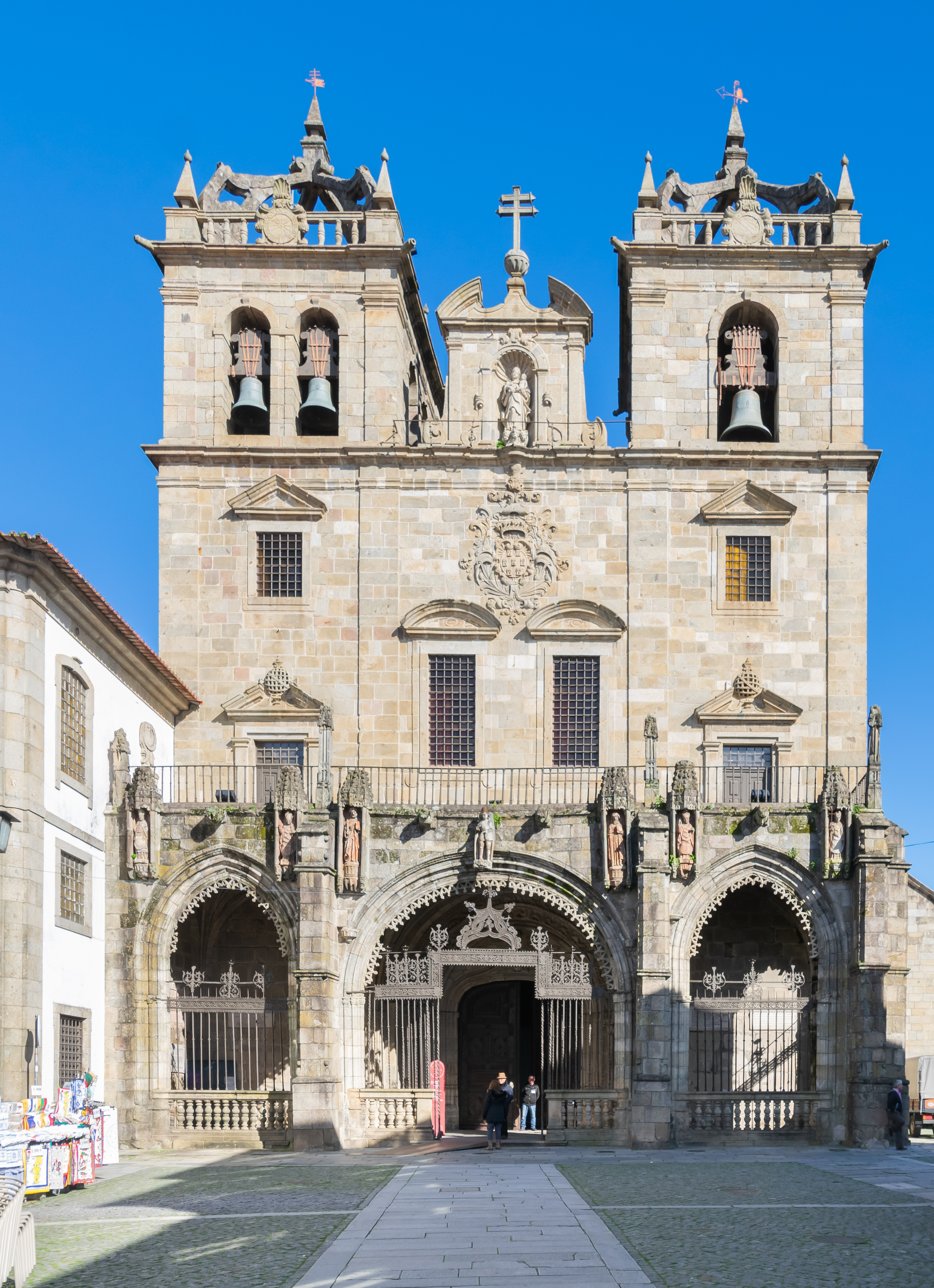
- Braga Cathedral

Location
- Country: Portugal

Statistics
- Area: 2,857 km^{2} (1,103 sq mi)
- Population: Total; Catholics: (as of 2012); 964,400; 886,300 (91.9%)
- Parishes: 552

Information
- Denomination: Catholic Church
- Sui iuris church: Latin Church
- Rite: Bragan Rite; Roman Rite
- Established: 4th Century (As Diocese of Braga); 1071 (As Archdiocese of Braga)
- Cathedral: Cathedral of St Mary in Braga

Current leadership
- Pope: Leo XIV
- Archbishop designate: Jose Manuel Garcia Cordeiro
- Suffragans: Aveiro; Bragança-Miranda; Coimbra; Lamego; Porto; Viana do Castelo; Vila Real; Viseu
- Auxiliary Bishops: Nuno Manuel dos Santos Almeida; Nélio Pereira Pita
- Bishops emeritus: Jorge Ortiga

Map

Website
- diocese-braga.pt

The Archdiocese of Braga (Latin: Archidioecesis Bracarensis) is a Latin Church ecclesiastical territory or archdiocese of the Catholic Church in Portugal. It is known for its use of the Rite of Braga, a use of the liturgy distinct from the Roman Rite and other Latin liturgical rites.

A metropolitan see, its suffragan dioceses are the dioceses of Aveiro, Bragança-Miranda, Coimbra, Lamego, Porto, Viana do Castelo, Vila Real, and Viseu. The chief prelate of Braga is known as the Archbishop-Primate of Braga (Arcebispo Primaz de Braga), as the traditional holder of the Primacy of the Spains, claiming supremacy over all prelates of the whole Iberian Peninsula; however in modern times, this title is only recognized in Portugal. The current archbishop-primate is Jose Manuel Garcia Cordeiro, appointed in 2021.

== History ==
The tradition that Peter of Rates, a disciple of James the Great, preached here, is handed down in the ancient Breviary of Braga (Breviarium Bracarense) and in that of Évora; but this, as the Bollandists tell us, is due to the "credulity of the people of Braga, who have listed him in their modern (17th century) Martyrology." Paternus was certainly bishop of the see about 390.

In its early period the Diocese of Braga produced the famous writer Paulus Orosius (fl. 418). At the beginning of the eighteenth century a contest was waged over the birthplace of Orosius, some claiming him for Braga and others for Tarragona. The Marquis of Mondejar, with all the evidence in his favour, supported the claim of Braga; Dalmas, the chronicler of Catalonia, that of Tarragona.

Avitus of Braga, another writer of some importance, was a priest who went to the East to consult with Augustine of Hippo at the same time that Orosius, who had been sent by Augustine, returned from consulting Jerome. It was through him that the priest Lucian of Caphar Gamala near Jerusalem made known to the West the discovery of the body of Stephen (December 415). The Greek encyclical letter of Lucian was translated into Latin by Avitus and sent to Braga with another for the bishop, Balconius, and for his clergy and people, together with a relic of Saint Stephen. Avitus also attended the Council of Jerusalem against Pelagius (415). There were two others of the same name, men of note, who, however, wrought incalculable harm by introducing into these provinces the doctrines of Origen and Victorinus of Poetovio.

Some have denied that Braga was a metropolitan see; others have attempted without sufficient evidence, however, to claim two metropolitan sees for Gallaecia before the sixth century. In fact, after the destruction of Astorga (433) by the Visigoths, Braga was elevated to the dignity of a metropolitan see in the time of Pope Leo I (440–461). Balconius was then its bishop and Agrestius, Bishop of Luigi, was the metropolitan. At the latter's death the right of metropolitan rank was restored to the oldest bishop of the province, who was the bishop of Braga. From this time until the Muslim conquest of Hispania (711), he retained the supremacy over all the sees of the province.

In 1110 Pope Paschal II restored Braga to its former metropolitan rank. When Portugal became independent, Braga assumed even greater importance. It contested with Toledo the primacy over all the Iberian sees, but the popes decided in favour of the latter city, since it retained as suffragans the dioceses of Porto, Coimbra, Viseu, Bragança-Miranda do Douro, Aveiro, and Pinhel. In 1390 Braga was divided to make the Archdiocese of Lisbon, and in 1540 its territory was again divided to create the Archdiocese of Évora.

The most famous of writers in this diocese is Bishop Martin who died in 580, noted for his wisdom. Gregory of Tours says of him that he was born in Pannonia, visited the Holy Land, and became the foremost scholar of his time. St. Isidore of Seville ("De Viris illustribus", c. xxxv) tells us that he "was abbot of the Monastery of Dumio near Braga, came to Gallaecia from the East, converted the Suebi inhabitants from the heresy of Arianism, taught them Catholic doctrine and discipline, strengthened their ecclesiastical organization, and founded monasteries. He also left a number of letters in which he recommended a reform of manners, a life of faith and prayer and giving of alms, the constant practice of all virtues and the love of God."

Braga having been destroyed by the Saracens, and restored in 1071, a succession of illustrious bishops occupied the see. Among these were Maurício Burdinho (1111–14), sent as legate to the Emperor Henry V (1118), and by him created antipope with the title of Gregory VIII; Pedro Juliano, Archdeacon of Lisbon, elected Bishop of Braga in 1274, created cardinal by Gregory X in 1276, and finally elected pope under the name of John XXI; Bartholomew a Martyribus (1559–67), a Dominican, who in 1566, together with Father Luís de Sotomayor, Francisco Foreiro, and others, assisted at the Council of Trent; de Castro, an Augustinian (1589–1609), who consecrated the cathedral, 28 July 1592.

Aleixo de Meneses, also an Augustinian, was transferred to Braga from the archiepiscopal see of Goa. He had been appointed bishop to the St. Thomas Christians of the Malabar Coast in Farther India and had forcibly Latinized them with the help of missionaries of the various religious orders. Under him was held the controversial anti-Council of Diamper (1599), for the establishment of the church on the Malabar Coast. He died at Madrid in 1617 in his fifty-eighth year as President of the Council of Castile.

Three other bishops of note were Rodrigo da Cunha (1627–35), historian of the church in Portugal and author of a monograph on the Bishops and Archbishops of Braga; Rodrigo de Moura Teles (1704–28), who sponsored the restoration of the cathedral; and Diogo de Sousa, bishop of Porto (1496–1505) and Archbishop of Braga (1505–1532), protector of the arts and sciences, who modernized and revitalized Braga with new constructions in the city and the Sé.

The Archbishop of Braga has claimed the title of Primate of the Spains (Portuguese: Primaz das Espanhas) as the oldest diocese on the Iberian Peninsula.

== Bishops of Braga ==
=== from 45 to 600 ===
Peter of Rates (45-60) *
Basílio (60-95) *
Ovidius (95-130) *
Policarpo (130-200) *
Serfriano (200-230) *
Fabião (230-245) *
Félix (245-263) *
Secundo (263-268) *
Caledónio (268-270) *
Narciso (270-275) *
Paterno I (275-290) *
Grato (290-299) *
Salomão (299-300) *
Sinágrio (300-326) *
Lenóncio (326-328) *
Apolónio (328-366) *
Idácio I (366-381) *
Lampádio (381-400) *

- Paterno II (400–405), the first attested bishop
- Profuturo I (405–410) *
- Pancraciano (410–417) *
- Balcónio (417–456)
- Valério (456–494) *
- Idácio II (494–518) *
- Apolinário (518–524) *
- Castino (524–525)*
- Valério (525–527) *
- Ausberto (527–537) *
- Julião I (537–538) *
- Profuturo II (538–550)
- Eleutério (550–561) *
- Lucrécio (561–562)
- Martin of Braga, Apostle of the Suebi (562–579)
- Pantardo (580–589)
- Benigno (589–612) *

=== from 612 to 1108 ===
- Tolobeu (612–633) *
- Julião II (633–653)
- Potâmio (653–656)
- Fructuosus of Braga (656–660)
- Manucino (660–661) *
- Pancrácio (661–675) *
- Leodegísio Julião or Leodecísio Julião (675–678)
- Liúva (678–681)
- Quirico (681–687) *
- Faustino (688–693)
- Félix (693-734?)

Bishop Felix was the last bishop residing in Braga, which was totally destroyed in 716, until the restoration of the bishopric in 1070. Due to the Muslim invasion of the Iberian Peninsula, his successors were established in Lugo, in Galicia.

==== Bishops in Lugo ====
Victor of Braga
Erónio (736-737) *

- Hermenegildo (737-738) *

Tiago (738-740) *
Odoário (740-780)

? Ascárico (780–811) *

- Argimundo (821–832) *

? Nostiano (832) *

Ataúlfo (832-840)

- Ferdizendo (Fridesindus) (840–842) *

Dulcídio (842-850) *

? Gladila (850–867)

Gomado (867-875) *
Flaviano Recaredo (875-881)

? Flaiano (881–889) *

- Argimiro (889–910) *

Teodomiro (910-924) *

- Hero (924–930)

Silvatano (930-942) *
Gundisalvo or Gonçalo (942-950)

? Hermenegildo (951–985)

Pelágio or Paio (986-1003)
Diogo or Tiago (1003–1004)
Flaviano (1004–1017)
Pedro (1017–1058)
Maurelo (1058–1060)
Sigefredo (1060)
Vistrário (1060–1070)

==== Bishops in Braga ====
- Pedro I of Braga (1071–1093)
- Gerald of Braga (1095–1109)

== Archbishops of Braga ==
=== from 1109 to 1500 ===
- Maurício Burdino (1109–1118)
- Paio Mendes (1118–1137)
- João Peculiar (João I) (1139–1175)
- Godinho (1176–1188)
- Martinho Pires (Martinho I) (1189–1209)
- Pedro Mendes (Pedro II) (1209–1212), elected
- Estêvão Soares da Silva (1213–1228)
- Silvester Godhino (1229–1244)

Gualtério (1240–1245)

- João Egas (1245–1255)

Sancho (II) (1251–1265)

- Martinho Geraldes (Martinho II)(1255–1271)
- Pedro Julião (1272–1273)

[Sancho (III) (1275)]

- Ordonho Alvares (1275–1278)
- Tellius, O.Min. (Telo) (1278–1292)
- Martinho Pires de Oliveira (Martinho III) (1295–1313)
- João Martins de Soalhães (João III) (1313–1325)
- Gonçalo (Gonçalves) Pereira (1326–1348)
- Guilherme de la Garde (1349–1361)
- João de Cardaillac (João IV) (1361–1371)
- Vasco (1371–1372)

Martinho de Zamora (1372), elected, but not confirmed by the Pope

- Lourenço Vicente (1374–1397)

Petrus Laurentii (Avignon Obedience) (23 May 1384–1397?)
João Garcia Manrique (1397–1398) (Avignon Obedience)

- Martinho Afonso Piris da Charneca (1398–1416)
- Fernando da Guerra (1417–1467)
- Luís Pires (1468–1480)
- João de Melo (1481)
- João Galvão (1482–1485)
- Cardinal Jorge Vaz da Costa, O.Cist. (Jorge II) (1486–1488) Jorge da Costa had been Bishop of Evora (1463–1464), and Archbishop of Lisbon (1464–1500). He was named a Cardinal by Pope Sixtus IV on 18 December 1476. He was named Archbishop of Braga, with permission to retain Lisbon, in 1486. In 1488, with the permission of King João II and the agreement of Pope Innocent VIII, he resigned the diocese of Braga in favor of his brother of the same name, Jorge da Costa.
- Jorge da Costa (1488–1501), brother of his predecessor

=== from 1501 to 1703 ===
- Cardinal Jorge da Costa (1501–1505)
- Diogo de Sousa (Diogo I) (1505–1532)
- Henrique I de Portugal, (King of Portugal, Cardinal) (1533–1540)
- Diogo (II) da Silva, O.F.M. (1540–1541)
- Duarte de Portugal (1542–1543)
- Manuel (I) de Sousa (1545–1549)
- Frei Baltasar Limpo (1550–1558)
- Bartolomeu dos Mártires, O.P. (1559–1581)
- João (VIII) Afonso de Menezes (1581–1587)
- Agostinho de Jesus, O.E.S.A. (1588–1609), born Pedro de Castro
- Aleixo de Menezes (1612–1617)
- Afonso Furtado de Mendonça (1618–1626)
- Rodrigo da Cunha (1627–1635)
- Sebastião de Matos de Noronha (1635–1641)

Sede vacante (1641–1670)

Pedro de Lencastre (1654–1670), Administrator, not confirmed by the Pope

- Veríssimo de Lencastre (1670–1677)
- Luís de Sousa (1677–1690)
- José de Menezes (1692–1696)
- João de Sousa (1696–1703),

=== from 1704 to present ===
- Rodrigo de Moura Teles (1704–1728)

Sede Vacante (1728–1740)

João da Mota e Silva, (Cardinal) (1732), elected, not confirmed by the Pope

- José de Bragança (1740–1756)
- Gaspar of Braganza (1758–1789)
- Caetano Brandão, T.O.R. (1790–1805)
- José da Costa Torres (José III) (1807–1813)
- Miguel da Madre de Deus da Cruz, O.F.M. (1815–1827)
- Pedro Paulo de Figueiredo da Cunha e Melo (Pedro V) (1843–1855)
- José Joaquim de Azevedo e Moura (José IV) (1856–1876)
- João Crisóstomo de Amorim Pessoa (João X), O.F.M. (1876–1883)
- António José de Freitas Honorato (António I) (1883–1898)
- Manuel Baptista da Costa (Manuel II) (1899–1913)
- Manuel Vieira de Matos (Manuel III) (1915–1932)
- António Bento Martins Júnior (António II) (1933–1963)
- Francisco Maria da Silva (1963–1977)
- Eurico Dias Nogueira (1977–1999)
- Jorge Ferreira da Costa Ortiga (1999–2021)
- Jose Manuel Garcia Cordeiro (2021–present)

== See also ==
- Rite of Braga
- St. Peter's Basilica, Guimarães

== Bibliography ==
- [Corréa, José] (1830). Serie chronologica dos Prelados conhecidos da igreja de Braga desde a fundação da mesma igreja até o presente tempo. Precedida da una breve Noticia de Braga Antiga (etc.) (in Portuguese). Coimbra: Na real Imprensa da Universidade.
- Da Cunha, Rodrigo (1632). Tractatus de primatu bracharensis ecclesiae in vniuersa Hispania ... (in Portuguese). Braga: ex officina Ioannis Roderici.
- Da Cunha, Rodrigo (1635). Historia ecclesiastica dos arcebispos de Braga (in Portuguese). Vol. Tomo segondo. Braga: Manoel Cardozo.
- Flórez, Enrique (1906). España sagrada. reprint of edition Madrid 1759 (in Spanish). Vol. Tomo XV: De la provincia antigua de Galicia en común y la Iglesia de Braga en particular. Madrid: Imprenta de Fortanet.

=== Episcopal lists ===
- Gams, Pius Bonifatius (1873). Series episcoporum Ecclesiae catholicae: quotquot innotuerunt a beato Petro apostolo. Ratisbon: Typis et Sumptibus Georgii Josephi Manz. (Use with caution; obsolete)
- Eubel, Conradus, ed. (1913). Hierarchia catholica, Tomus 1 (second ed.). Münster: Libreria Regensbergiana. (in Latin)
- Eubel, Conradus, ed. (1914). Hierarchia catholica, Tomus 2 (second ed.). Münster: Libreria Regensbergiana. (in Latin)
- Eubel, Conradus; Gulik, Guilelmus, eds. (1923). Hierarchia catholica, Tomus 3 (second ed.). Münster: Libreria Regensbergiana.
- Gauchat, Patritius (Patrice) (1935). Hierarchia catholica IV (1592-1667). Münster: Libraria Regensbergiana.
- Ritzler, Remigius; Sefrin, Pirminus (1952). Hierarchia catholica medii et recentis aevi. Vol. Quintum (V) (1667-1730). Patavii: Messagero di S. Antonio.
- Ritzler, Remigius; Sefrin, Pirminus (1958). Hierarchia catholica medii et recentis aevi. Vol. Sextum (VI) (1730-1799). Patavii: Messagero di S. Antonio.
- Ritzler, Remigius; Sefrin, Pirminus (1968). Hierarchia Catholica medii et recentioris aevi sive summorum pontificum, S. R. E. cardinalium, ecclesiarum antistitum series... A pontificatu Pii PP. VII (1800) usque ad pontificatum Gregorii PP. XVI (1846) (in Latin). Vol. VII. Monasterii: Libr. Regensburgiana.
- Ritzler, Remigius; Pirminus Sefrin (1978). Hierarchia catholica Medii et recentioris aevi... A Pontificatu PII PP. IX (1846) usque ad Pontificatum Leonis PP. XIII (1903) (in Latin). Vol. VIII. Il Messaggero di S. Antonio.
- Pięta, Zenon (2002). Hierarchia catholica medii et recentioris aevi... A pontificatu Pii PP. X (1903) usque ad pontificatum Benedictii PP. XV (1922) (in Latin). Vol. IX. Padua: Messagero di San Antonio. ISBN 978-88-250-1000-8.

==== Acknowledgment ====
- Archdiocese of Braga, newadvent.org. Accessed 23 February 2024.
