= António Baltasar Marcelino =

- Bishop of Aveiro
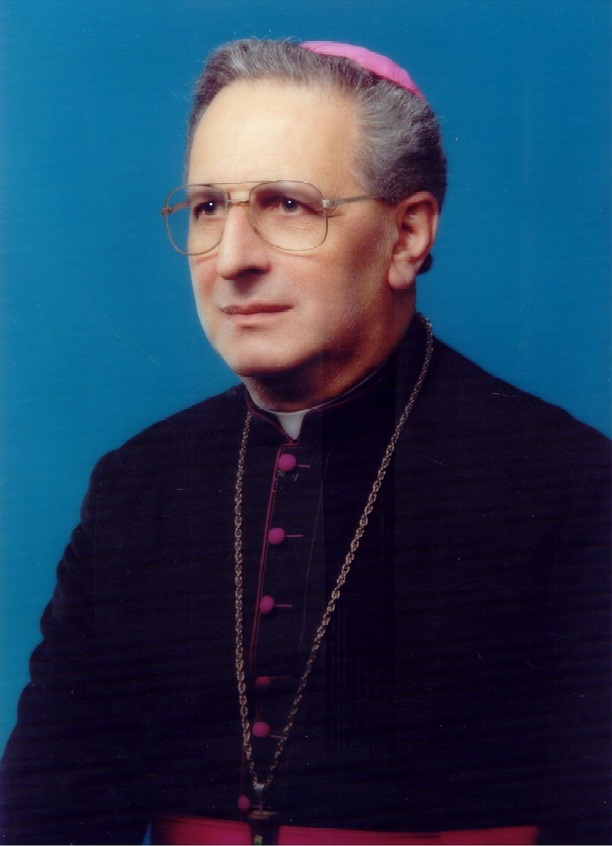
- Church: Catholic Church
- Diocese: Diocese of Aveiro
- In office: 20 January 1988 – 21 September 2006
- Predecessor: Manuel d'Almeida Trindade
- Successor: António Francisco dos Santos
- Previous posts: Coadjutor Bishop of Aveiro (1983-1988); Titular Bishop of Cercina (1975-1983); Auxiliary Bishop of Lisbon (1975-1983)

Orders
- Ordination: 9 June 1955
- Consecration: 21 September 1975 by António Ribeiro

Personal details
- Born: 21 September 1930 Castelo Branco, Beira Baixa Province, Portugal
- Died: 9 October 2013 (aged 83) Aveiro, Aveiro District, Portugal

António Baltasar Marcelino (21 September 1930 – 9 October 2013) was a Portuguese Bishop of the Roman Catholic Diocese of Aveiro.

Marcelino was born on 21 September 1930 in Castelo Branco, Portugal. He was ordained on 9 June 1955, was named bishop in 1975, and retired in 2006.

Marcelino died of an undisclosed disease on 9 October 2013, aged 83, at a hospital in Aveiro.
