= Diocese of Aveiro =

Latin Catholic diocese in Portugal

Coordinates: 40.6397°N 8.6504°W

Diocese of Aveiro Dioecesis Aveirensis Diocese de Aveiro

Catholic
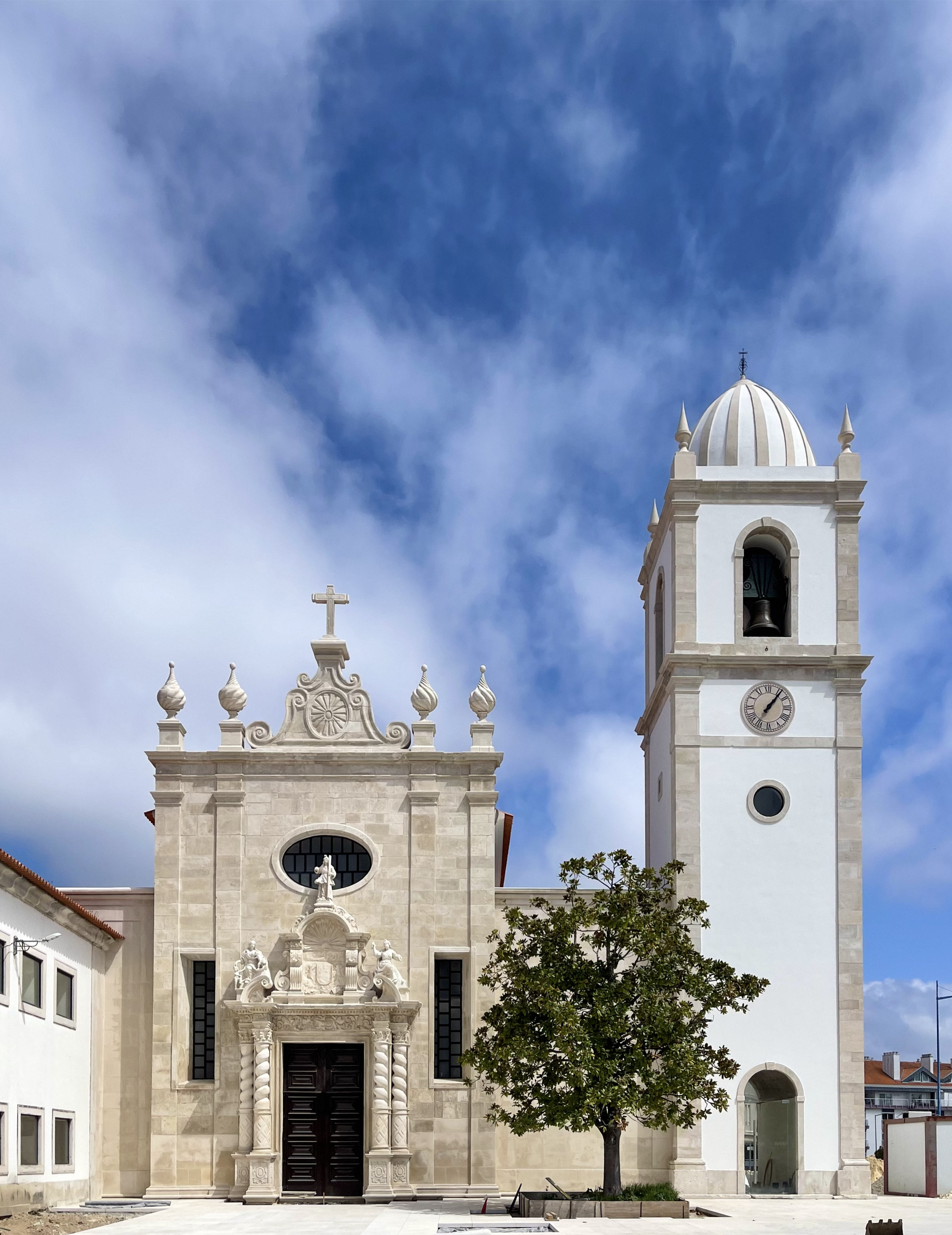
- Cathedral of Aveiro

Location
- Country: Portugal
- Metropolitan: Archdiocese of Braga

Statistics
- Area: 1,537 km^{2} (593 sq mi)
- Population: Total; Catholics: (as of 2012); 314,800; 274,400 (87.2%)

Information
- Denomination: Roman Catholic
- Rite: Latin Church
- Established: 24 August 1938
- Cathedral: Cathedral of St Dominic in Aveiro

Current leadership
- Pope: Leo XIV
- Bishop: António Manuel Moiteiro Ramos
- Metropolitan Archbishop: Jorge IV

Map
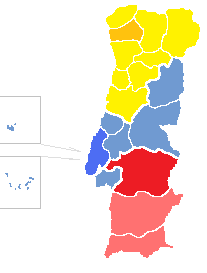

Website
- Website of the Diocese

The Diocese of Aveiro (Latin: Dioecesis Aveirensis) is a Latin Church diocese of the Catholic Church in Portugal. It has existed since 1938 when the historical dioceses of Coimbra, Porto, and Viseu were combined. It is a suffragan of the Archdiocese of Braga. In 2012, it had 274,400 baptized over 314,800 inhabitants.

Its see at Aveiro is also the capital of the district of Aveiro. The bishop is António Manuel Moiteiro Ramos, appointed in 2014.

== List of Bishops of Aveiro ==
1. António Freire Gameiro de Sousa (1774–1799)
2. António José Cordeiro (1801–1813)
3. Manuel Pacheco de Resende (1815–1837)
4. António de Santo Ilídio da Fonseca e Silva (1840
5. António Mendes Bello (1881), Diocesan administrator
6. João Evangelista de Lima Vidal (1940–1958)
7. Domingos da Apresentação Fernandes (1958–1962)
8. Manuel de Almeida Trindade (1962–1988)
9. António Baltasar Marcelino (January 20, 1988 – September 21, 2006)
10. António Francisco dos Santos (September 21, 2006 – February 21, 2014)
11. António Manuel Moiteiro Ramos (July 4, 2014- )

== Territory ==
The territory covers 1,537 km² and is divided into 101 parishes, grouped into 10 archipresbiterati, corresponding to the 10 municipalities of the district.
