= Doutor Lourenço Peixinho Avenue =

Main avenue of Aveiro, Portugal

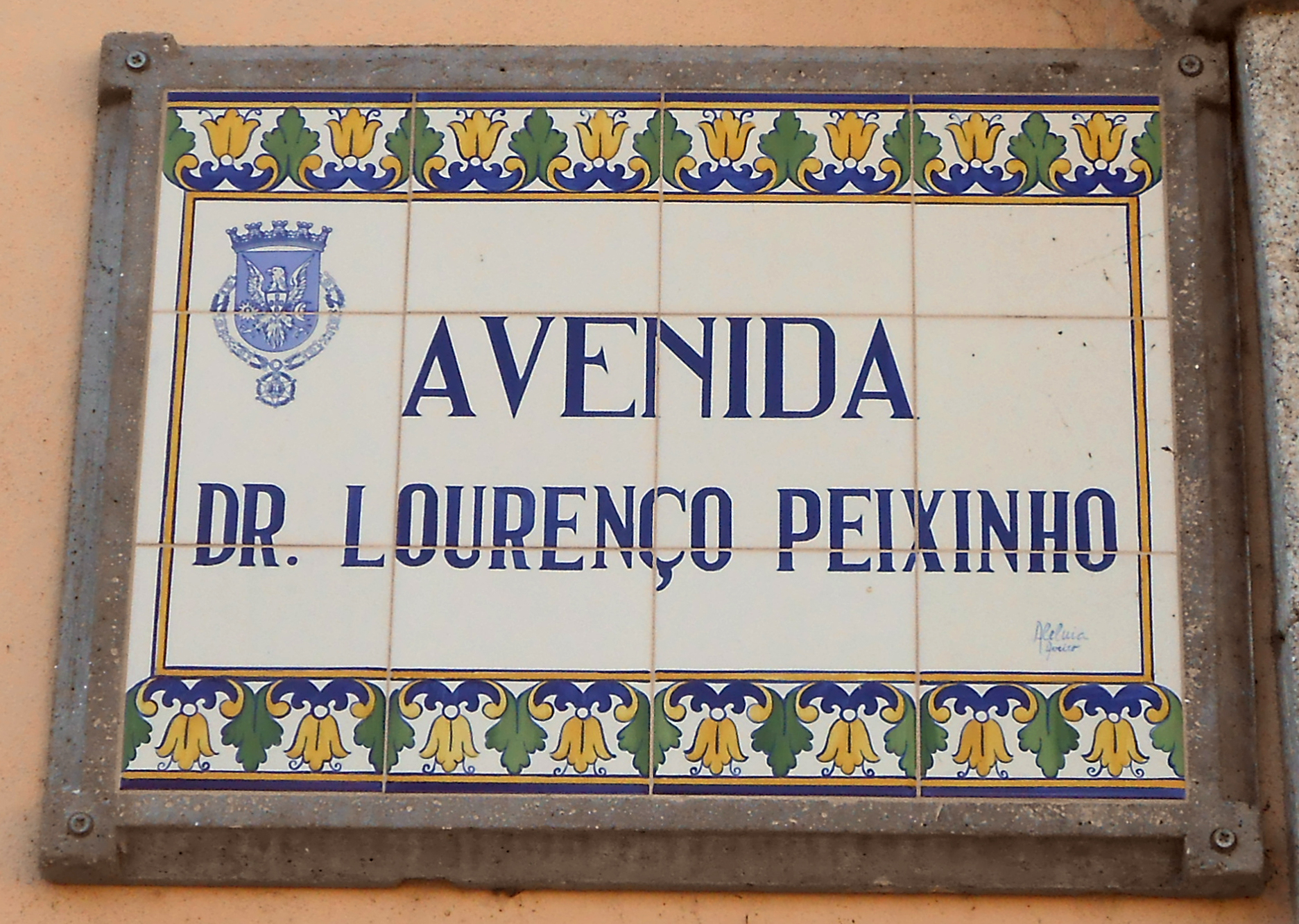
- One of the avenues' toponymy plaques.
- Interactive map of Doutor Lourenço Peixinho Avenue
- Native name: Avenida Doutor Lourenço Peixinho (Portuguese)
- Length: 1.1 km (0.68 mi)
- Location: Aveiro, Portugal
- East end: Estação Square
- West end: General Humberto Delgado Square

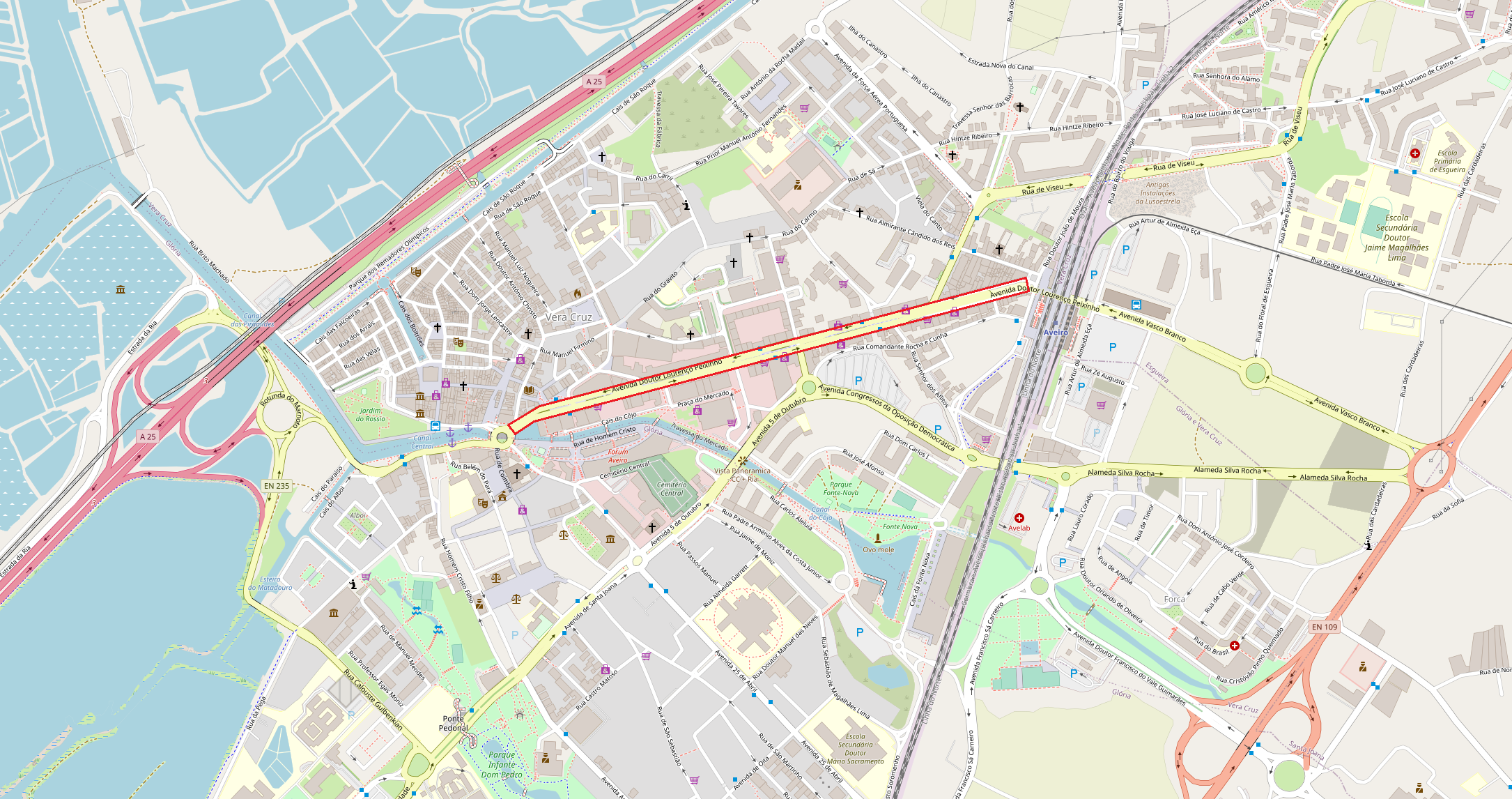
Avenue's location, in the center of the city of Aveiro (in red).

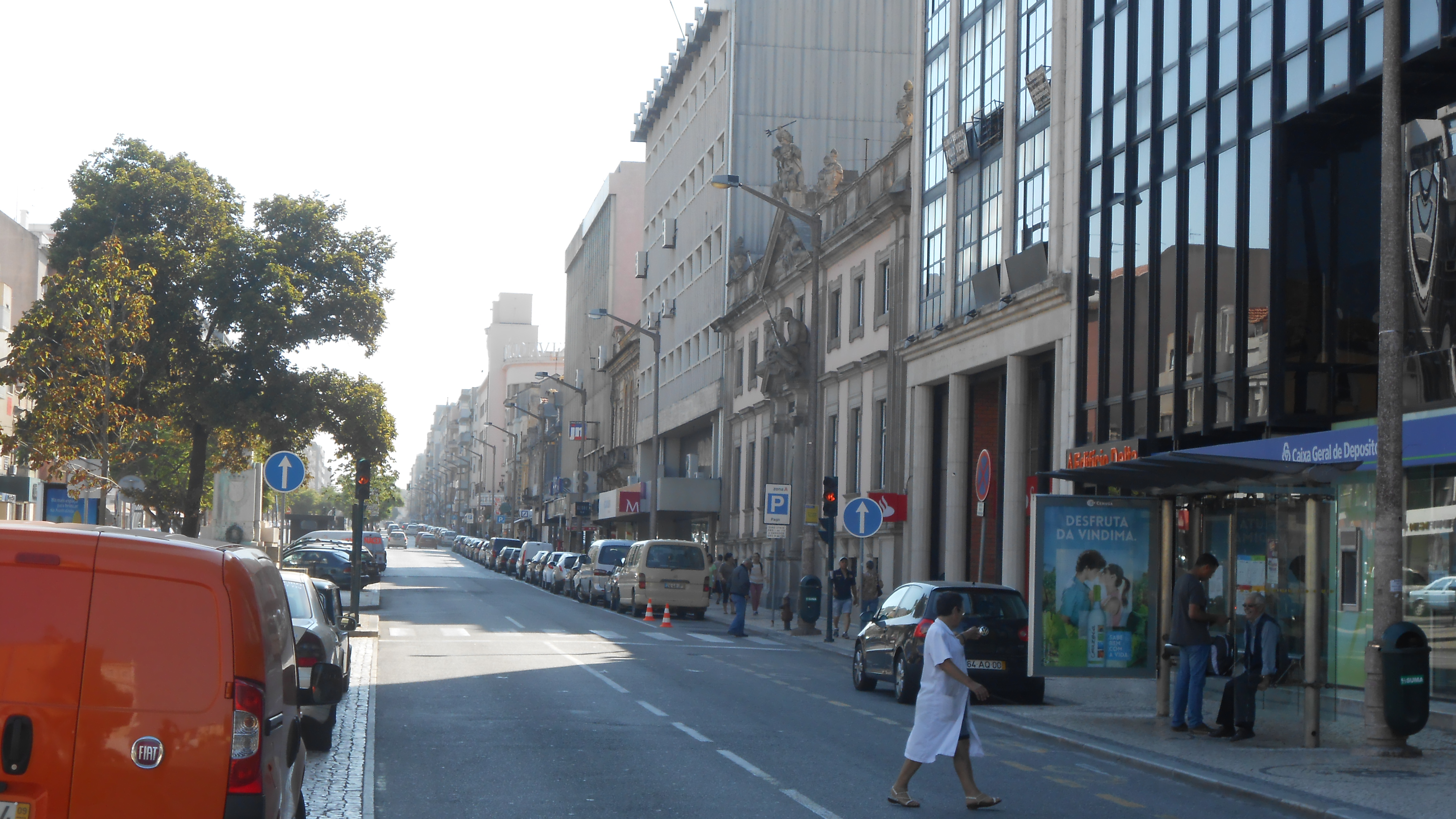
Avenue's view, next to the Banco de Portugal Building.

The Doutor Lourenço Peixinho Avenue (Portuguese: Avenida Doutor Lourenço Peixinho) is the main avenue of Aveiro, Portugal, stretching from the railway station to the General Humberto Delgado Square in the city center. With about 1,100 meters long, this artery is based on a rectilinear axis about 30 meters wide, with four lanes (two for each direction), separated by a wooded central plate. In this central section there is also a bikeway, created in support of BUGA's free use bicycles, a pioneering project in Portugal.

Initially designed as Cojo Avenue in 1907, and built from 1918 onwards under the name Central Avenue, this artery allowed to easily, quickly and functionally connect the railway to the city center and to the salt and fish industries, based in the Aveiro Lagoon, facilitating a route that was only possible through two indirect and difficult to cross paths (Estação Street and Americano Street). The opening of this axis was part of the great transformations that the city underwent during the 20th century and allowed its development and expansion to the northeast.

The avenue received its current name in 1943, in honor of the Aveirense Lourenço Simões Peixinho, president of Aveiro Municipal Chamber for 24 consecutive years (1918–1942) and main driver for its construction.

Despite undergoing a long construction and development process (1918–1935), Doutor Lourenço Peixinho Avenue quickly established itself as the main urban center of services and commerce in Aveiro, having undergone several alterations and requalifications over the years. The most recent, which began in August 2020, represented major changes to road and pedestrian circulation, in a project originally scheduled to be completed by the end of 2021. However, because of several delays in the work, less than 50 percent of the work was completed in January 2022.

== History ==
=== Context ===
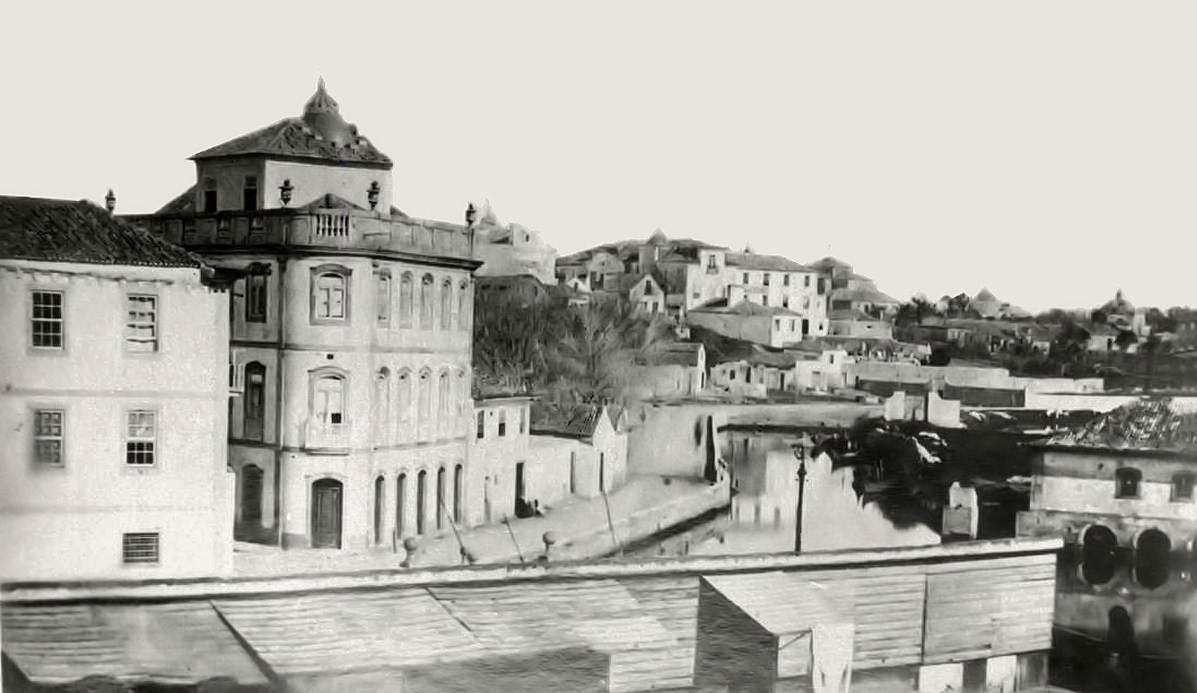
Location where the Avenue currently connects with the G. Humberto Delgado Square, pictured in 1890. The corner building still exists (current Ourivesaria Vieira). The construction of the Avenue forced the embankment of one of the channels that formed the Cojo Islet (in the center).

Inaugurated in 1864 and located far from the city center, the Aveiro's railway station caused, from early on, several connection problems. Although the railway promoted trade with other parts of the country, in the specific case of Aveiro, two additional goods transloadings were needed: one by maritime route (from Aveiro Lagoon to Cojo Wharf) and another from the city center to the station. This situation, therefore, did not serve the commercial interests and did not exploit the economic potentialities for the exportation of salt and fish, as well as pottery, wood and agricultural products. This issue was addressed by Aveiro Municipal Chamber, and it was initially proposed to create a connecting street between the station and the city center, for the advantages this would have for commerce, industry and agriculture.

When the railway track was inaugurated, the Municipal Chamber designed and built a provisional road, inaugurated months later as Estação Street (now Almirante Cândido dos Reis Street), which connected the station to the former Convento do Carmo (now the National Republican Guard barracks). The remaining route to the city center was winding and supported by several narrow profile streets (the Carmo, Gravito, Manuel Firmino and José Estevão Streets).

In 1873, the creation of a tramway connection between the station and Cojo Wharf was proposed by engineer Silvério Augusto Pereira da Silva. This connection would use animal-drawn carriages as vehicles, running on rails, to transport passengers or goods. The project, approved by the Chamber, in an alternative route to the previous one and located south of it, eventually did not materialize. However, the idea of the direct connection of the station to Cojo Wharf was considered important, leading to the construction of Americano Street (currently Comandante Rocha e Cunha Street). After the opening of this route, the products from the Aveiro Lagoon started to be transported by sea to the Cojo Wharf, and then transhipped to ox carts and transported through Americano Street to the station, where they were again transhipped in railway carriages, in a more efficient process than the previous one, but still time-consuming, expensive and cumbersome.

There was also a proposal for the creation of a railway station at the Cojo Islet and respective connection to the Linha do Norte, but it never materialized. All the city's alternative railway connections, such as the Aveiro-Mar or S. Roque Branches, were created already during the 20th and 21st centuries. Of these, the only one still in operation is the Porto de Aveiro Branch Line.

=== First proposal ===
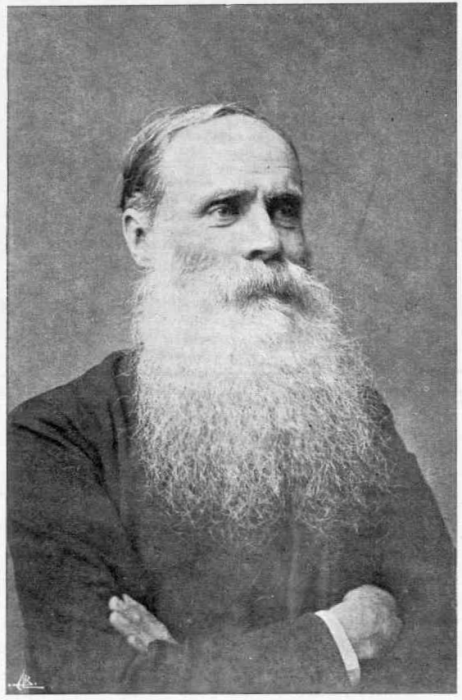
Jaime de Magalhães Lima, president of Aveiro Municipal Chamber (1893–1895) and author of the first proposal for the construction of the avenue.

The first concrete proposal for the opening of a direct route between the railway station and the city center appeared in 1895, by Jaime Magalhães Lima, president of Aveiro Municipal Chamber (1893–1895). Two hypotheses of layout were launched, referring to two central locations in the city where the avenue should end: the Marquês de Pombal Square, where the Court and former Aveiro Civil Government buildings are located, along with Município and Comércio Squares. These routes had in common the fact that they were related to important urban elements, in the city's context.

The first hypothesis was soon ruled out, since it would have required destroying part of S. Domingos Monastery (of which the Cathedral of Aveiro is part). The second route would not cause such a big impact in this aspect, since it would not jeopardize any significant building (it crossed mainly undeveloped agricultural land).

To the pressures that the Government was suffering to give greater technical and financial support to urban upgrading operations, it responded with the creation of the Ministry of Public Works and, in 1865, with the launching of the General Improvement Plans (Planos Gerais de Melhoramentos). In Aveiro, the improvement plan was drawn up from 12 July 1906 (date of Service Order No. 399), according to which the necessary authorization was given to the Directorate of Public Works.

Within this plan, special emphasis was given to the issue of connecting the railway station to the avenue that the Chamber intended to build for this purpose. It was in this context that the project of 9 July 1907 appeared. In the descriptive and justificatory memory of this project were explained the motivations of the Aveiro Municipal Chamber for the undertaking. It referred to the fact that the main roads or streets were insufficient for the increasing traffic of pedestrians and vehicles:

(...) all traffic to the station and to the populous villages (...) east of Aveiro is done by the E.R. nº 41 and its branch between Cojo and Vera Cruz (...); from here, from Vera Cruz to the station, all the traffic (...) accumulates on Estrada Real 41 (Gravito and Carmo Streets), a very narrow road that cannot be widened except at the cost of a lot of money, because it is all flanked by houses.

— "Descriptive and Justificatory Memorial" from the project of July 9, 1907.

Thus, it was intended to build "a 30 meters wide avenue between the city center and the station of the North and East railways, with two roads of 8 meters wide each, edged with 4 meters sidewalks, having a central sidewalk with 6 meters wide that separates the roads and two rows of trees". It was planned that the avenue's sidewalk would be formed by four trainéis (sections of road with constant slope), to overcome the unevenness of the terrain and respect the existing communication routes (Americano Street, Arnellas Route and Seixal Street). Along the entire length of the avenue and on both sides, walls would be built up to the height of the sidewalk, when the road passes in embankments, or up to the height of the marginal land, when it passes in excavations. These walls would also serve as fence walls, as support for the adjoining properties or as support for the walls themselves. Along the new avenue, a collector aqueduct would be laid, an important infrastructure within the context of modernizing the urban space.

This project would not be immediately realized, due to the Aveiro Municipal Chamber's inability to support the economic effort that a work of this magnitude implied. Until 1918, the construction of the new avenue would not be considered, although it would still be a desired and intended improvement for the city.

=== Final Project ===
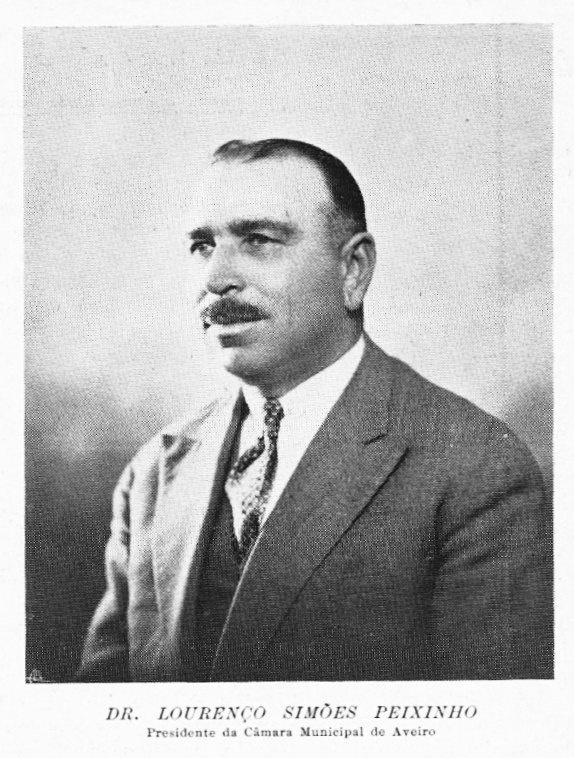
Lourenço Simões Peixinho, president of Aveiro Municipal Chamber (1918–1942) and main driving force behind the construction of the avenue.

The decisive step for the construction of the avenue was taken on 2 January 1918, during the inauguration session of the new Aveiro Municipal Chamber. In this moment, the newly sworn-in president of Aveiro Chamber, Lourenço Simões Peixinho, made known his broad program for local improvements, within which stood out a solution for the opening of the much desired avenue. His proposal was "to open an avenue 30 meters wide that, starting from the railway station, would end in front of the Cojo Wharf". He also proposed to expropriate two lateral and annexed strips, also 30 meters wide each, to be divided into "regular plots" and to be sold to build urban buildings.

In his exposition, Lourenço Peixinho emphasized the advantages of these additional expropriations, which would constitute the major change from the 1907 project:

(...) on the one hand, the avenue will not be bounded by walls, but by houses, but also, with the proceeds of their sales, it will meet the expenses of the expropriation and execution of the works of the same avenue.

— Lourenço Peixinho's description of the project, published in the newspaper "O Democrata", on January 11, 1918.

For the initial works and expropriations, Lourenço Peixinho suggested that the Municipal Chamber should take out a loan, up to 100,000 escudos, at 8% a year interest rate. The guarantee would be the mortgage of the expropriated lands and the income from the taxes on salt and clay. These would be amortizable with the product of the sale of the same lands and income from the same taxes. The great difficulty of the previous councils for the construction of the Avenue was related to their inability to bear such high costs. The law on public utility expropriation of 26 July 1912 would be determinant for the works to be carried out.

The project of the Avenue was approved in a Municipal Chamber meeting on 7 February 1918 and its governmental approval was published in the Diário do Governo on 26 April of the same year:

The Portuguese Republic Government, through the Minister of Commerce, agreeing with the opinion of the Higher Council of Public Works, orders the approval (for the purposes of the law of July 26, 1912, and article 94º, § 14º, of the law of August 7, 1913) of the project and respective budget in the amount detailed on February 28 of this year, relating to the construction work of the avenue, between the city of Aveiro (city center) and the railway station, in the extension of 1,064.32 m.

— Diário do Governo of April 26, 1918.

This project, in addition to the motivations already mentioned, indicated a greater concern on the Municipal Chamber's part in the future nature of the Avenue, a greater importance given to the (desired) urbanity for a road of this nature, a desire for more active participation in the process of conformation of the built environment. The project's descriptive memorial showed that, besides the obvious question of connection to the railway station, the intention was clearly stated that the Avenue would become the main reference axis for the city. Therefore, it was initially designated, in a symbolic and literal sense, Central Avenue.

The new axis would be built partially over the Cojo, implying a partial earthwork of this marshy area. The project framed the need to create a built space adjacent to the Avenue and a public space that would allow sociability. At its western end there was already the building of an old tide mill, which took advantage of the variation in the waters of the estuary in this area. At the time, the mill was a school, which would mark this end of the new avenue. Later this building would be converted into the Capitaincy of Porto de Aveiro (currently, the headquarters of the Municipal Assembly and an exhibition space).

The Avenue would have four lanes, separated by a wide central promenade with two rows of trees along its entire length. This sidewalk also housed the street lighting and several benches, dividing the Avenue into two lateral lanes, flanked by two shorter sidewalks, adjacent to the buildings. This central public space, existing between the two lanes, contributed to people walking and socializing in a large space.

=== Construction ===
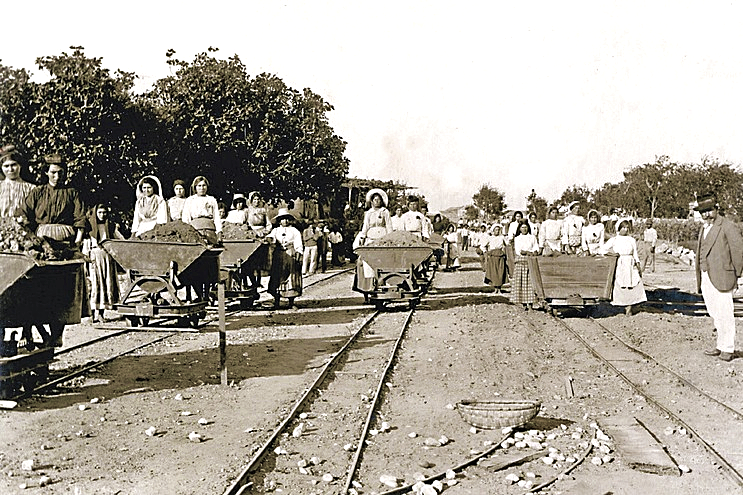
Works for the opening of the Avenue, 1918-1921.

The beginning of the works for the opening of the Avenue took place on 3 June 1918, on a portion of land that had been part of Manuel Mendes Leite's residence, and was greeted with "burning of firecrackers, salves of mortars and peals of bells".

The construction process proved to be long and slow, arousing great public interest, which was demonstrated by several mentions in the local press. About a year after the beginning of the work, the buildings whose location was incompatible with the opening of the Avenue began to be demolished. The last one, where the old Hotel Central was located, was demolished five years later, in 1924. The route was only completed when, in 1935, the Cojo Wharf was straightened to follow the alignment of the buildings, so that the Avenue would extend to the center.

It was initially planned that the development of the Avenue would be done in four trainéis, so as not to interrupt the existing communication routes. However, since the beginning of the earthworks, the advantage of the construction being done in only one trainel was recognized, eliminating the supporting walls, which made it more expensive, but at the same time more pleasant.

In 1921, the same year in which the project with these changes was presented, the indispensable work began for the laying of the iron pipe that, in the length of 200 meters, would replace the concrete piping that existed previously. From the moment the sidewalk was leveled, the space began to be used immediately, even though it was not in the best conditions for use. Due to the lack of paving, at busy times and on strong wind days, dust would rise and form clouds; and complaints in the press were constant, demanding the irrigation service to be intensified in this area, to prevent these situations from occurring. During periods of rain, mud would fill the roads and sidewalks.

For several years, the then Central Avenue remained in this condition, without sidewalks, proper lighting, or continuous occupation. The installation of these facilities took several years, due to the lack of city funds. The trees began to be planted in early 1928, and benches were only placed in 1933. The existing lighting was replaced by electric lamps in 1935, although electricity already existed in Aveiro since 1921. In August 1936, the set composed of three rows of lamps, separated by 20 meters, was lit for the first time: one in the central area, with double lamps, and the others on the side walks, with single lamps.

The sidewalks and pavements also remained, for several years, unfinished. The macadamization of the descending path was made in 1932, and in 1937 the first paved sidewalk appeared, on the side where more buildings were built. However, ten years later, there were still unpaved or uncemented sidewalks.

In 1934, the Monument to the Dead of the Great War (also known as the Soldado Desconhecido) was inaugurated on Dr. Lourenço Peixinho Avenue. Its location was intended to be noble and in an area with exposure, having the Marquês de Pombal Square as first possibility; but its installation on the Avenue would, on the one hand, confirm the importance acquired by it and, on the other, enrich its public space.

Despite all the constraints related to the delay of the works, the Avenue became a privileged place in the context of the city and destination of the inhabitants in leisure time:

(...) the favorite walk of the Aveirenses, either in the calm summer nights, or in the radiant days of sun, in winter.

— Description in the newspaper "O Democrata", September 27, 1941.

Gradually, a recreational equipment began to appear on this artery: cafes, restaurants, esplanades, and a movie theater. The social life that, above all, used to take place in Rossio Square, would be transferred to the Avenue. Similar to the great European avenues, this artery gave the city a new scale and a modernized image of civility.

=== Building and development ===
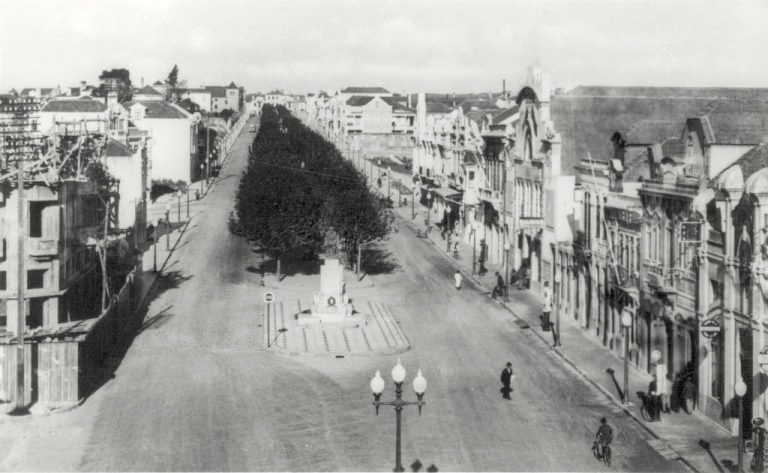
View from the west in 1936. In the center, the recently opened Soldado Desconhecido is visible. On the left, the Alfredo Esteves Building (also known as Café Avenida) was under construction.

The construction of the Avenue started in the late 10's, with small scale buildings, up to three floors. Unlike Liberdade Avenue (Lisbon) and Boavista Avenue (Porto), Dr. Lourenço Peixinho Avenue did not house the ostentatious palaces of the bourgeois class, orienting itself towards high-rise buildings with commercial first floors and housing on the upper floors. There were, however, isolated cases of large single-family houses in some portions of the Avenue, but they had little expression in the overall building stock.

The construction of these buildings started soon after the beginning of the work on the Avenue and would extend for several years. The sale by public auction of the plots of land for construction, resulted from the expropriations made by Aveiro Municipal Chamber, began on 24 April 1919 and ended on 6 November 1944. The delay in the sale of these plots was due to the Municipal Chamber's choice of expropriation by zones, to reduce the burden of the work.

The Avenue became a place where buildings with recreational uses, such as restaurants, cafes and performance halls, were being implanted and installed. This Avenue started to have two functions that were interrelated: the passage space and the leisure space, simultaneously. The public space then became notorious, through the large scale that the Avenue had in the city of Aveiro, as it was already usual in large European cities.

In the middle of the 40s, there were still several empty lots, whose construction was urgent in order to conform the Avenue. Thus, in October 1945, the Municipal Chamber decided to enjoin all owners of land adjoining the public road to build buildings within eighteen months under penalty of the municipality proceeding to its expropriation and sale by public auction, if not complied. This measure, revealing the importance given at the time to the Avenue and the urban space, happened in addition to a previous one (July 1944), in which owners were ordered to repair and whitewash the fronts of their buildings, as well as the walls or gables visible from the public thoroughfare within 90 days. This was an attempt to respond to the appeals of the population, published in the press, to solve the problem of the bad impression caused by the degraded walls, the unfinished gardens, and the vegetable gardens installed on unoccupied land, especially to those who came to the station from the outside.

=== Lourenço Peixinho's Death ===
On 7 March 1943, Lourenço Simões Peixinho died in Aveiro, a few months after leaving the presidency of the Municipal Chamber, a position he had held uninterruptedly for 24 years. His death was intensely felt throughout the city and a wave of consternation invaded Aveiro, reflected in the local newspapers of the time:

Death has just annihilated one of the most precious lives that Aveiro possessed, so many were the services rendered to the city as president of the Municipal Chamber and Provedor of the Santa Casa da Misericórdia. (...) Lourenço Peixinho does not go all to the grave. His great name lives and will always live on, and will remain respected and admired, closely linked to his remarkable work as mayor of the city of Aveiro for 24 years, work that was remarkable and very valuable for the growth of the city and county and also connected to his extraordinary action in the provedoria of the Santa Casa da Misericórdia.

— "O Democrata" newspaper, March 13, 1943.

Following his death, a proposal was presented at the ordinary meeting of the Municipal Chamber on 11 March 1943, signed by Francisco Pereira Lopes and approved by acclamation, proposing that the then Central Avenue be given the name by which it is currently known, Doutor Lourenço Peixinho Avenue.

=== Municipal Master Plans ===
The process of elaboration of an Urbanization Plan for Aveiro (Plano de Urbanização para Aveiro) started in 1944, when legislation on this matter was approved, indicating that the Municipal Chamber would be obliged to make a topographical survey of the city, to gather the elements for an urban study. In early 1945, the architect David Moreira da Silva was commissioned to elaborate the Urbanization Plan, and the first results of this work were presented in September 1948, in the Urbanization Draft for the City of Aveiro (Anteplano de Urbanização da Cidade de Aveiro), approved in the same month. The Draft was controversial, for some proposals, and generated an intense discussion in the city around urban planning issues. The most striking in this chapter are those concerning the transformation of the central area of the city: the creation of the Ponte Square (now General Humberto Delgado Square) and the widening of Coimbra Street, which would involve several demolitions:

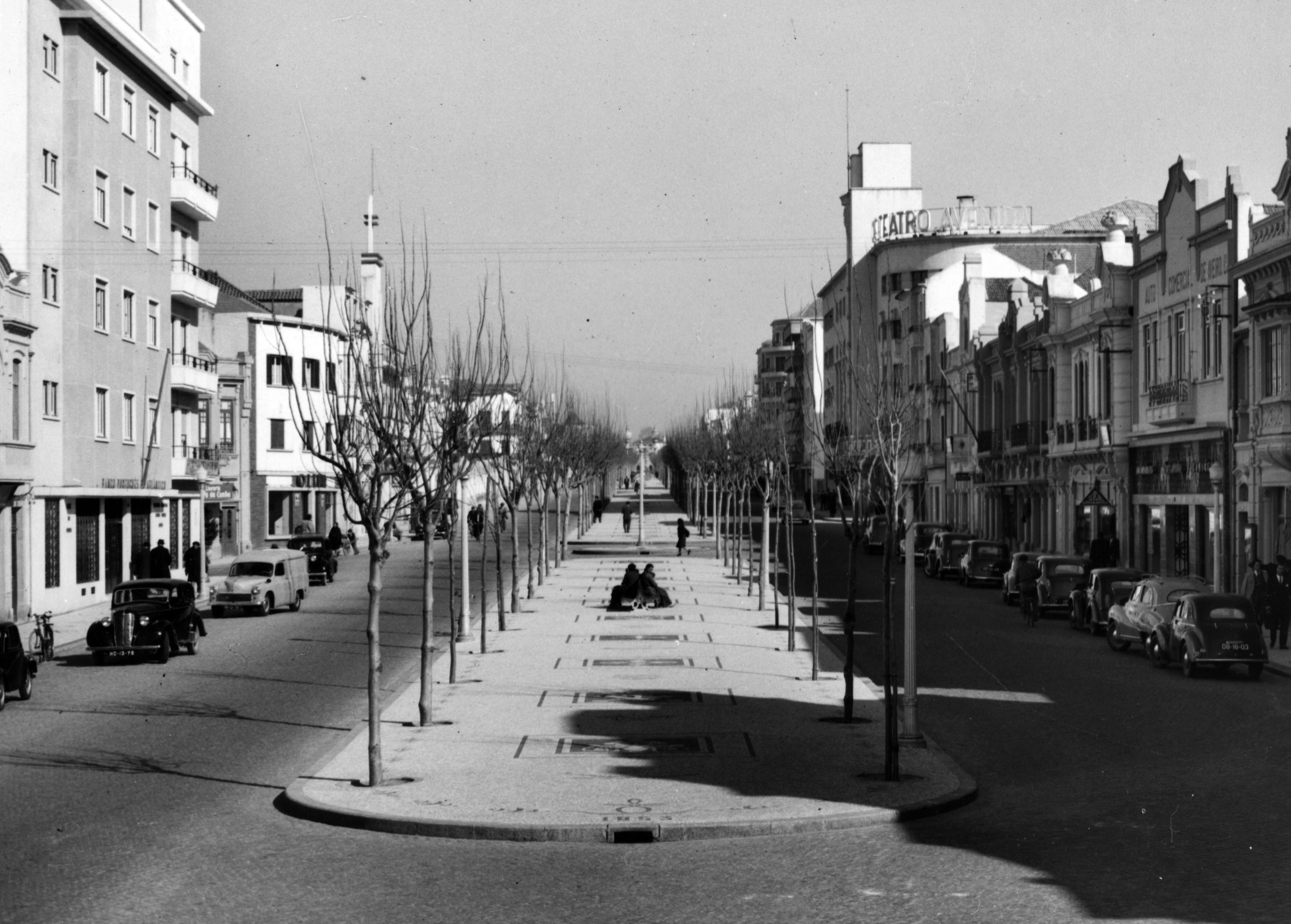
The Avenue, in 1953. The Companhia de Seguros Ultramarina Building is visible on the left side. On the right side, the Avenida Cine-Teatro.

(...) the "expansion and regularization of the existing Square next to the railway station"; the "construction of a Square on the west end of Dr. Lourenço Peixinho Avenue"; the "rectification and enlargement of Comandante Rocha e Cunha Street, whose layout should allow its buildings to hide in good conditions the backs of the buildings facing the Avenue."

— Urbanization Draft for the City of Aveiro, 1948.

In 1962, in view of the response inability of the studies that had been carried out for 17 years, the Municipal Chamber decided to change the approach to the problem, creating a municipal urbanization office, under the guidance of architect Robert Auzelle.

On 28 June 1963, almost a year after it became active, the work was presented for public consideration. This plan was characterized by the use of sample systematization as a tool in city planning, relying on architecture to formalize the volumetric options, and the collaboration of architects Fernando Távora, J. Carlos Loureiro and Luís Pádua Ramos was significant in this regard. Unlike previous studies, which viewed the urban planning problem more under the aspect of aesthetic guidelines, the Master Plan of the City of Aveiro (Plano Diretor da Cidade de Aveiro), through the analysis of the development of the city over time and its probable evolution, intended to establish the set of guidelines for economic and social development that would encompass all the vital interests of the region.

This Plan intended to consolidate the port expansion, safeguarding, however, the natural conditions of the salt pans and the Lagoon, of inestimable touristic value; and the industrial expansion, in locations outside Aveiro. The idea was to prevent an exaggerated dispersion of the population, but to allow the city to maintain the characteristics of a center of tertiary activity and rest, attractive to this same industry. In the road aspect, the Dr. Lourenço Peixinho Avenue had an important role in this study: it was reinforced as the main axis of the city and would be the base of a continuous city circulation system. The forecast of large parking needs was accompanied by a future development of offices and commerce in the central area, and services in the civic and cultural center. Regarding the built space, there was a concern to conserve and maintain the somewhat traditional architecture, which was observed in the rather narrow streets, of small lots occupied by buildings of one or two floors; and, on the other hand, to define a new aspect for Aveiro, with taller buildings, particularly in new housing areas and in the buildings bordering the Avenue.

Thus, the Municipal Master Plan (Plano Diretor Municipal – PDM) highlighted the Avenue's recognized and attributed importance, as a centralizing axis of urban living in social, commercial and service terms; as the basis of the circulation system; as a definer of an image for the city; and as the main axis of the agglomerate:

(...) occasional and exceptional commerce is located, especially, along Dr. Lourenço Peixinho Avenue, in the central part of the city, on both banks of the canal, and also along the older roads. (...) there is a concentration of doctors' offices and engineers' offices along Dr. Lourenço Peixinho Avenue (...) Industry related to the automobile branch: although they are spread throughout the agglomerate, it is along the Dr. Lourenço Peixinho Avenue that we verify the existence of the largest number and most important establishments of this branch (...)

— Aveiro Municipal Master Plan, 1964.

The integration of existing buildings in the new project was limited to the most recent ones (generally those with higher height). At the eastern end, next to the railway station building, a large group of buildings would be created, which could house support services to the station, forming a large square, deviated in relation to the Avenue. For the complex located between this artery and Almirante Cândido dos Reis Street, it was sought an implantation that would follow the direction of the lots, at an accentuated angle in relation to the Avenue, maintaining the first floor façade plan in alignment with the others. With this plan, there was a significant inversion in the aspect of Dr. Lourenço Peixinho Avenue, with a densification of this area. The impact of this plan was felt mainly in the architectural fabric, leading to the demolition of several buildings. Some of those were smaller scale buildings from the Avenue's opening moment, with only two or three floors. In their place, buildings with six or seven floors appeared, fulfilling the planned modernization.

The Aveiro PDM started a process of building replacement on the Avenue that would not be fully fulfilled. After the Detailed Plan for Dr. Lourenço Peixinho Avenue (Plano de Pormenor para a Avenida do Dr. Lourenço Peixinho), more urbanistic studies would appear in Aveiro: the General Urbanization Plan (Plano Geral de Urbanização, made by Macroplan, in 1981) and the PMD of 1995. However, within these plans, the former was the one that most marked the development of the Avenue.

The Casa Tenente José de Sousa Oliveira, by Alberto Vimeiro Pinto, was built between 1948 and 1949 and demolished in 1965. The case of this building exemplifies the change of typology that occurred in Dr. Lourenço Peixinho Avenue in the 1960s, with the PDM of 1964: a single-family dwelling on an individual lot would give way, in only 16 years, to a six-story income-earning building.

The 1964 PDM allowed the buildings to be risen, in height, up to the seventh floor, with an eighth floor set back on most of the street. In the following decades, particularly from the 1970s on, these high-rise buildings became commonplace, allowing for a sharp increase in real estate speculation. These edifications were built along all sections of the Avenue, sometimes in isolation. Consequently, there is, currently, a great variation in height, which, along with formal and typological variations and the degradation of some of its built heritage, have contributed over time to the aspect loss of the Avenue. In urban terms, progressive alterations have been made to the central area, changing the configuration of the Avenue. The forms of intervention in the central area denote its devaluation, as was evident in the Draft of 1948:

(...) its perspective is so highly impaired by the existence of a wide tree-lined central plate. Dr. Lourenço Peixinho Avenue has been a central axis and driving force of the city of Aveiro. Among its most modern streets, besides Araújo e Silva Avenue, (...) the one that stands out by far and deserves special mention, for its width and length, as well as the effort that represents for the city its realization, is Dr. Lourenço Peixinho Avenue. The artery connecting the old center of the city with the railway station, (...) is considered appropriate as the main axis of the new agglomerate.

— Urbanization Draft for the City of Aveiro, 1948.

The Avenue attracted great density of movement and people. With the increase in the number of cars, it became an important axis of circulation in urban road traffic. Recent changes in the eastern end, with the construction of a tunnel under the railway line, strongly changed the circulation and living habits in this area of the Avenue.

=== Second half of the 20th century ===
Over the years, the characteristics of Dr. Lourenço Peixinho Avenue have changed. The densification of this space, which began in the 1960s, with the construction of high-rise buildings occupying all the lots, continued in the following years until today. Some buildings from the early days of the Avenue were sacrificed during this process, in a development identical to that of many arteries with the same characteristics in the country. On one hand, the economic growth from the late 1970s on would intensify the commercial, administrative, and service life; and on the other hand, the appreciation of land prices would give rise to speculative operations that resulted in the outsourcing of these arteries. Thus, they ceased to be predominantly residential spaces and became important poles of commercial activities and work in general.

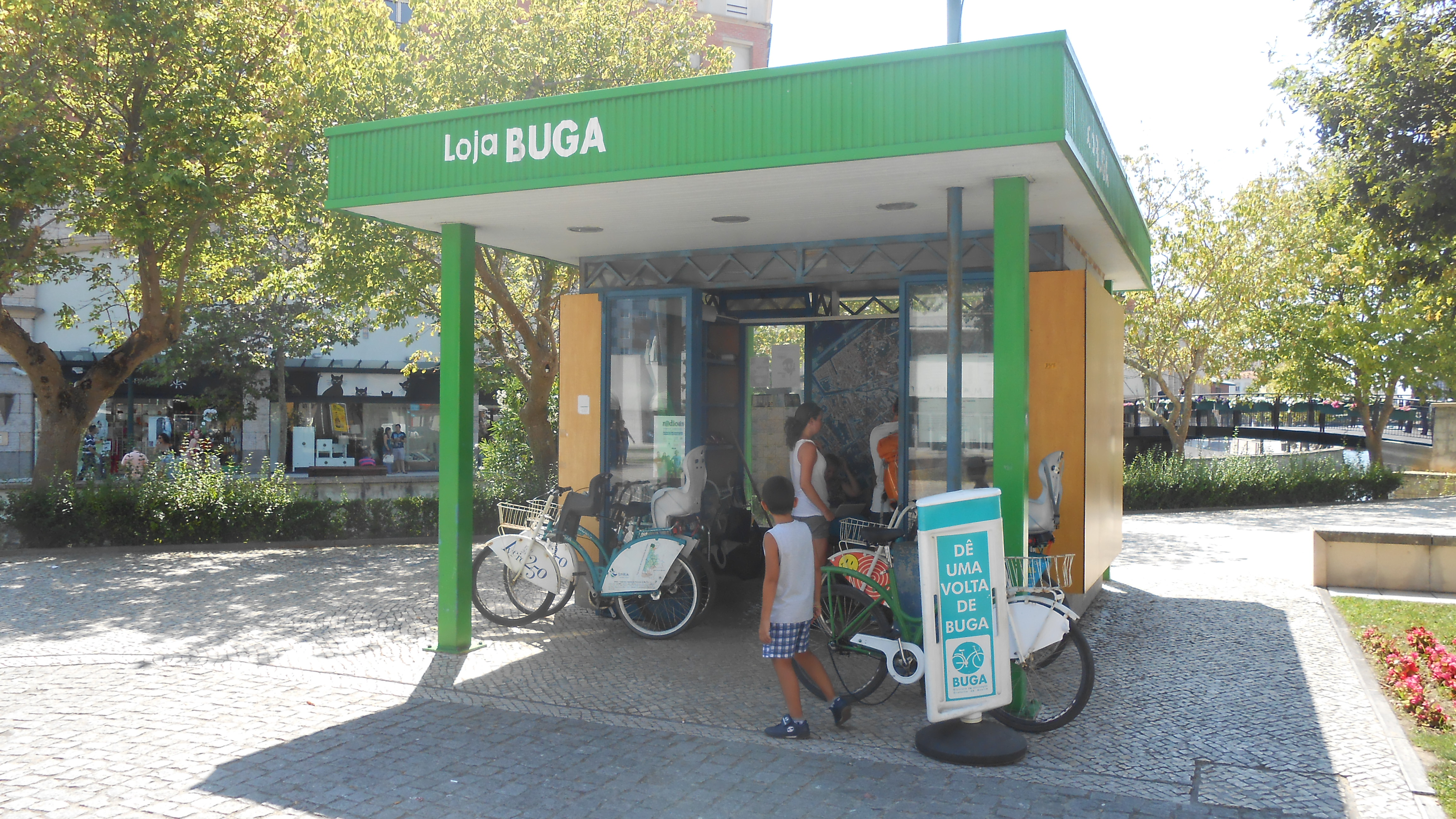
One of the BUGA stores, located at the entrance of Fórum Aveiro.

Regarding the Avenue's public space, it is currently verified that the central separating area has lost its value as a social space, privileged for pedestrian use, due to the growing importance of other uses and other priorities for the city: in a first phase, it gave way to automobile circulation that, breaking its continuity, interrupted it by sectors, in order to allow traffic towards the transversal streets; in a second phase, in 1999, the changes were significant, for its conversion into a bikeway, inserted in the BUGA (Bicicletas de Utilização Gratuita de Aveiro) free use bicycle project, a pioneering initiative in Portugal started in October of that year, but whose results were not the expected.

From the 1980s, the euphoria and growth, caused by the country's good economic moment and the freedom feeling from the Carnation Revolution, provided more openness regarding the characteristics of the buildings to be built on this artery. Most of the buildings were intended for offices, so, following the period's trend, it was generally opted for the abundant use of glass on the façade. These were buildings that intended to bring to the Avenue a cosmopolitan modernity air that would contrast with the bourgeois aspect of the older buildings.

In these years the first shopping centers appeared: the Oita and the 2002. Later, the Centro Avenida and two other smaller commercial spaces appeared on this artery: the Centro Avenida Building and the Multicentro Avenida Building. These two were more of a shopping gallery, since only the ground level was occupied by commerce, although a difference in elevations was created for better use of the accessibility to the street. In both the Oita Shopping Center and the 2002 Shopping Center, their greatest attraction were the movie theaters, which allowed them to become reference points in the city.

Later, the opening of new large shopping and leisure areas in Aveiro (Fórum Aveiro, next to the Avenue, and Glicínias Shopping Center), imposed a progressive abandonment and decay of the previous spaces. They became obsolete places and their movie theaters were, in the meantime, closed. In recent years, there has been a progressive loss of importance of the Avenue as a commercial area, due in large part to the appearance of new shopping centers. However, its importance has remained in some service and office sectors. The banking expansionism proved to be a well marked phenomenon in this artery, with several entities occupying commercial spaces where previously cafes, restaurants or stores were located.

=== 21st century ===
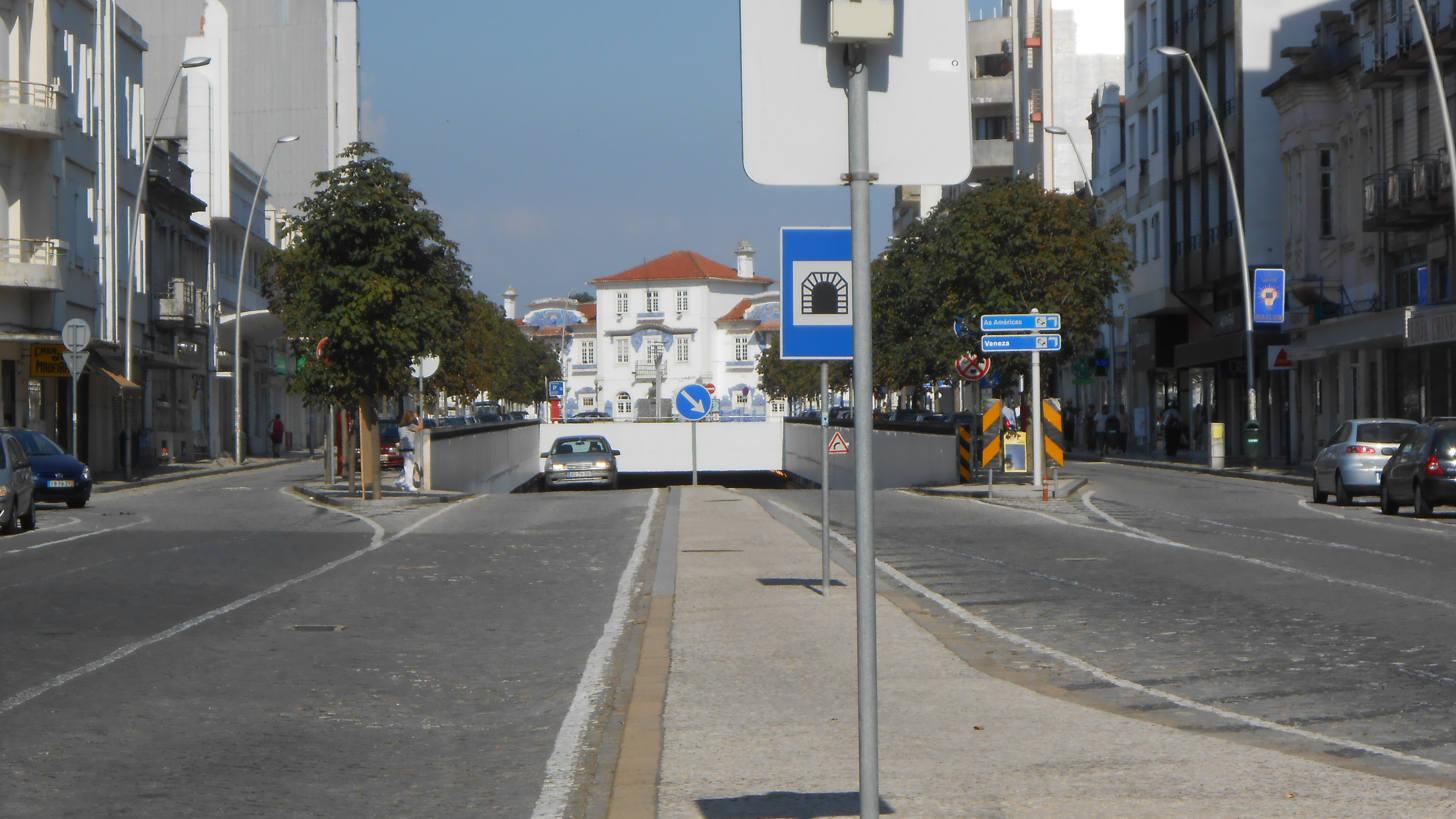
Tunnel entrance under the railway station, at the eastern end of the avenue.

In 2006 the new Railway Station was built, designed by architect João Lúcio Lopes. Faced with two fronts, together with the Avenue's east plan, this infrastructure shows an intention of development and expansion to the other side of the railway line, overcoming the physical limit to the expansion of the city caused by the Linha do Norte, which creates a rupture to the east, consisting of urban voids. Over time, attempts have been made to integrate this railway structure, creating level crossings. However, the tunnel built at the top of the Avenue is only for roads, forcing pedestrians to use the new station (a public use building that spreads underground and in two fronts) to cross the line. Contrary to what was previously proposed and realized, the tunnel allowed road traffic coming from the other side of the line to be drained directly onto the Avenue, further breaking the concept of the central area and public promenade.

From the early 10s, also as a result of the decline of traditional commerce, there was an exponential growth in the number of small/medium utilitarian stores for low-value products, in a process identical to that of several other places in the country. In commercial terms, there was even an inversion of the Avenue's characteristics. It was no longer a privileged space for exceptional commerce and began to house other types of less characteristic exploitation. While the exceptional commerce is still predominantly located in the western part of the Avenue (which, due to its proximity to the center, has always been more prestigious), these new commercial spaces have been located mainly in the eastern part of the Avenue, where the abandonment and decline of economic activities was more visible. The decline was also observable in the state of preservation of the buildings, since this depends largely on their ability to generate wealth. It was notorious the number of ads for sale, generally in vacant buildings in a high degree of deterioration. The same was true for commercial spaces, that is, several advertisements for sale, lease and rental, even in recent buildings.

=== Requalification ===
The vertiginous increase of tourism in Portugal and, in particular, in Aveiro, from the second half of the 2010s, gave the Avenue a renewed interest. With the arrival of thousands of tourists (many of them, through the railway station), the Dr. Lourenço Peixinho Avenue became again the main "gateway" to the city, as originally planned, which resulted in new investments in the buildings and equipment inserted in it.

This renewed interest in the Avenue area had repercussions on the existing buildings, many of which were gradually rehabilitated and converted to commerce. Some services traditionally located in this area were also transformed to a more commercial and touristic side. An example of this is the closure of the last cinema near the avenue (Fórum Aveiro), in 2018, and subsequent conversion into a large electronics retailer (Fnac).

Balanced equally by the increase of tourism in the region, in 2019 three new hotels were announced on or near the Avenue: the Avenida 60 aparthotel (resulting from the rehabilitation of a former offices building), Cinco Avenida Building and the conversion of the former Banco de Portugal Building into a five-star hotel.

These factors accelerated the planning process for the redevelopment works on the Avenue, which have been equated for several years and officially presented by the Aveiro Municipal Chamber in 2016, in the form of the Strategic Plan for Urban Development of the City of Aveiro (Plano Estratégico de Desenvolvimento Urbano da Cidade de Aveiro – PEDUCA).

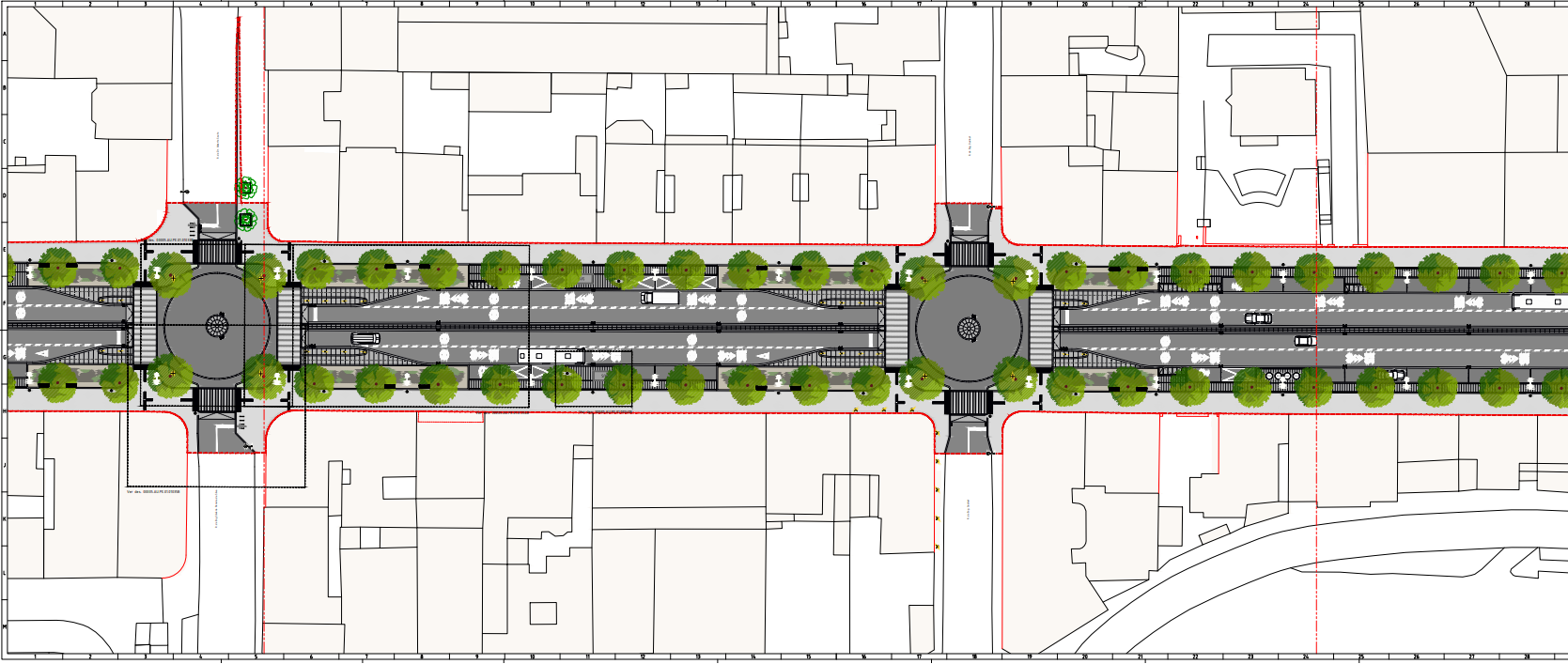
Detail of a part of the requalification project of the Avenue, to be executed during the years 2020/2021.

The PEDUCA was unfolded in three sub-plans, developed in an articulated and integrated way:

- Action Plan for Urban Regeneration (Plano de Ação para a Regeneração Urbana – PARU), which consisted in the implementation of operations aimed to improve the urban environment, ensuring social cohesion and strengthening and enhancing the distinctive features of Aveiro;
- Sustainable Urban Mobility Plan (Plano de Mobilidade Urbana Sustentável - PMUS), which was based on the implementation of operations to enhance soft modes and promote intermodality between modes of transport;
- Integrated Action Plan for Disadvantaged Communities (Plano de Ação Integrado para as Comunidades Desfavorecidas - PAICD), which was based on promoting physical, economic, and social regeneration, and improving the integration of communities living in social districts in urban areas.

The PEDUCA foresaw significant changes in the traditional layout of the Avenue, including:

- Elimination of the central sidewalk (present since the initial project, although with several changes);
- Increase of the lateral sidewalks, from the current 2.5–3 meters wide to 9.5 meters;
- Elimination of the existing trees in the central plaza, and planting/transplanting of new ones on the lateral sidewalks;
- Redesigning the road lanes (two for each direction, with one of them intended exclusively for public transportation and bicycles);
- Reduction of the number of parking spaces for cars, from 280 to 80;
- Elimination of the several existing traffic lights on the Avenue, through the creation of roundabouts;
- Creation of the Arcos Square in the perimeter between the old Banco de Portugal Building, the Municipal Library and the old Capitaincy of Porto de Aveiro Building.

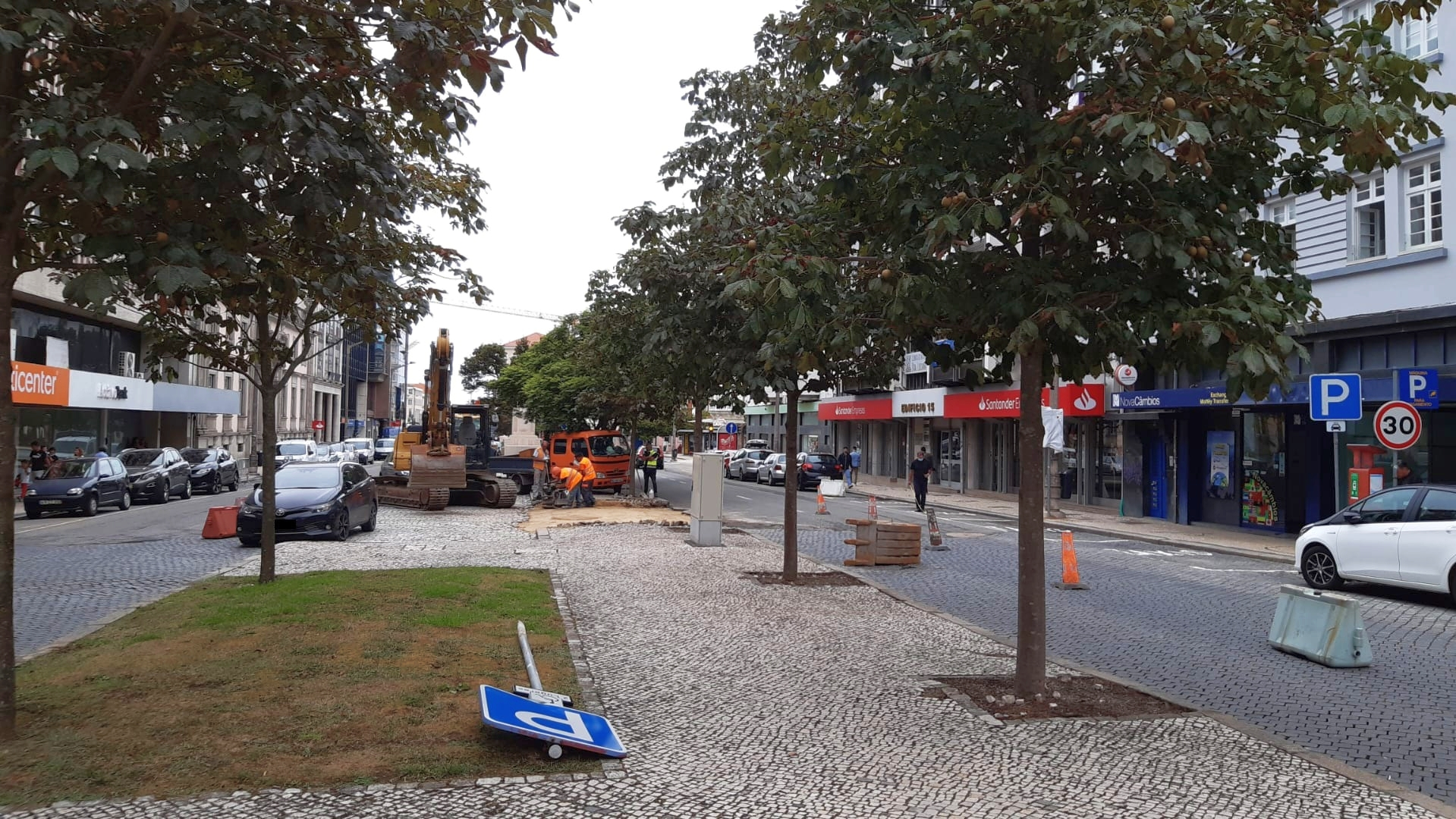
Beginning of the requalification works, in August 2020.

With this project, the Aveiro Municipal Chamber sought to fulfill eight fundamental principles:

- Dignify the urban character;
- Decrease conflict points;
- Increase the space dedicated to pedestrians, soft modes and public transport;
- Decrease the Avenue's road aspect, giving it back its original boulevard characteristic;
- Improve circulation conditions and public transport stops;
- Improve transversal permeability conditions, favoring soft mobility;
- Qualify and introduce vegetal elements defining arboreal axes, with the appropriate species;
- Consider solutions that reduce noise levels.

In October 2019, the project to redevelop the Avenue (budgeted at €4.5 million) was approved, with work starting on 17 August 2020 originally expected to be completed by September 2021. However, by January 2022, less than half of the work was completed, because of several delays.

During the work to relocate the Monument to the Dead of the Great War from its original location to the intersection of the Avenue with Conselheiro Luís Magalhães Street, a document dated 11 August 1933 was discovered inside, which mentioned the will to honor "the sons of this Municipality who were killed on the battlefield of the Great War (1914–1918), honoring the homeland." The document, signed by Lourenço Peixinho, was found by chance, since there is no known copy of the Monument's original project.

== Architecture ==
=== 1920s ===
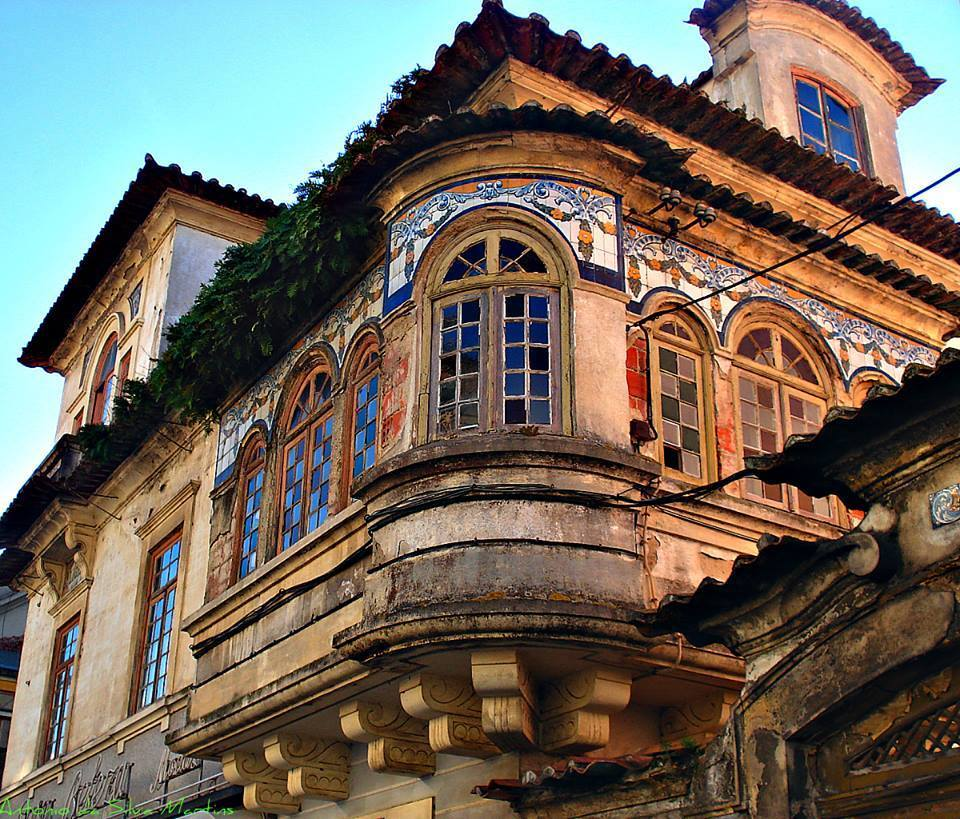
Vivenda Lígia, built in 1923, is considered the oldest building still standing on the Avenue.

The first construction project on the Avenue entered the Aveiro Municipal Chamber in 1920 and corresponded to a housing building by João da Maia de Fonseca e Silva. On 21 April 1921, a request from Artur Trindade for the construction of his house in the "New Avenue", designed by the architect Francisco Augusto da Silva Rocha, was submitted. These two houses no longer exist, having been demolished in the meantime. Both were single-family dwellings, with two floors and a small attic.

In 1923, António Simões Cruz had a house built by the same architect (Francisco Rocha), which followed the typology of the previous ones. This building still exists, being considered the oldest of this Avenue. It is usually called Vivenda Lígia, because it has a small tile panel with that name. In late 2021, a renovation work began for a luxury enterprise.

In the same year, the Manuel Maria Moreira Building was designed, located in the corner between the Avenue and Engenheiro Oudinot Street. Designed by Jaime Inácio dos Santos, it is marked by a cylindrical tower in the corner, with classical elements, including stonecraft, the platband, the pediment, as well as more traditional elements, such as the cement plastered cornice and the frieze of the tiles. Although its affiliation with the Art Nouveau and Art Deco movements of the region is evident, the project essentially reveals the eclecticism characteristic of many buildings by this architect, who was responsible for the public works of Aveiro and author of a set of buildings that stand out both for their structures and for their ornamentation, especially with regard to the use of polychrome tiles on the façades, and which contributed to highlight the city in the panorama of Portuguese pre-modernist architecture. Standing out from the surrounding buildings by its imposing dimensions, the Building is characterized by its balance, elegance in the treatment of the façades and by the diversity of styles applied, particularly the neoclassical notes. This buding is classified as a Monument of Public Interest (Monumento de Interesse Público – MIP) and is still in use, being currently composed of commercial first and second floor and residential attic.

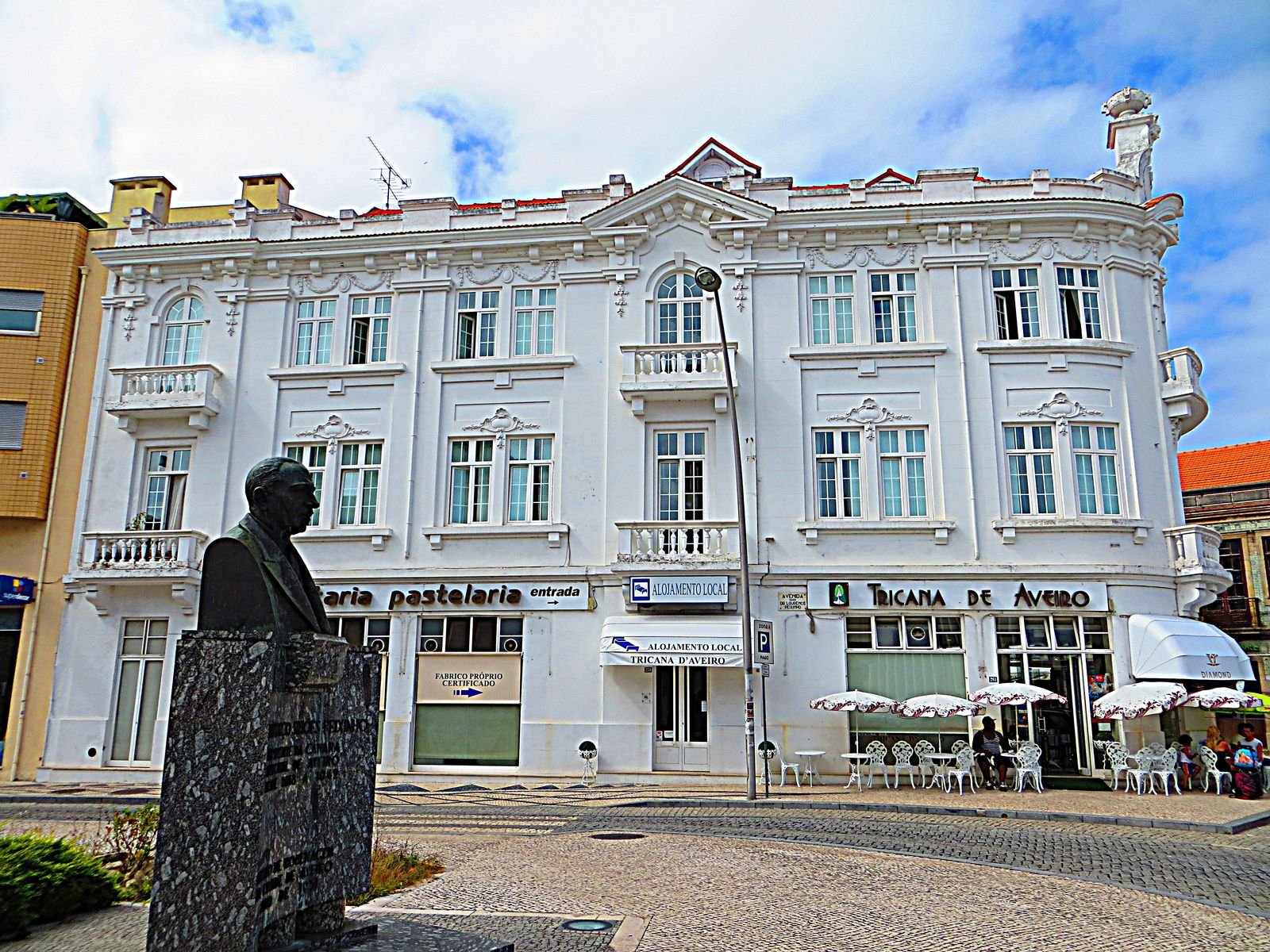
Façade of the Pensão Avenida. In front of it, the bust in honor of Lourenço Peixinho.

The Pensão Avenida, whose first project dates back to 1924, played an important role in the consolidation of Dr. Lourenço Peixinho Avenue, as it was one of the first buildings to integrate the new artery in the old city structure. It is a building that makes the articulation in the corner with the Almirante Cândido dos Reis Street, where the access to the railway station used to be. Its privileged location, close to the station and with immense visibility from it, is associated with its function, by the provided situation. The building, especially through the corner, presents itself almost as the "face" of the Avenue and of Aveiro, when arriving in the city by train. The design of the elevation to the Avenue presents total symmetry, starting from a central axis where the entrance to the pension is located. This axis is also marked by two balcony windows and the pediment that tops the composition. Stylistically, the building refers to French academism by its profuse decoration and classical character. The design is exquisite, although somewhat outdated for the time. Unlike other buildings in the same urban situation, the decorative treatment of the elevations for both streets is the same. The decoration is concentrated around the openings, with a notable concern in the treatment of the openings in the corner. The building also has a worked platband, only interrupted by the fronts marking the entrance and the corner, and finished in the west, in both elevations, with a different section where two balcony windows stand out. Over the years the building has maintained, despite changes made to the first floor, both its function and its original design.

The Casa Gervásio Aleluia (1929), designed by the architect Francisco Rocha, currently houses the Selectarte pastry shop and the headquarters of the Portuguese Communist Party (PCP) of Aveiro. This two-story building is, despite the modifications on the first floor, one of the best preserved of this artery. Although its function is different, its residential nature remains. Also, concerning the materials, there was a remarkable preservation, because unlike other examples, there was no misrepresentation of the construction principles. It was at the lower floor level that the construction suffered the greatest changes, and these have to do mainly with the introduction of signs and alike. The changes in the elevation contemplating a more open entrance to the establishment and the opening of shop windows were made in 1931 and 1947, respectively. From the first reading of the building, the stylistic difference of this house in relation to most of its counterparts on the Avenue stands out, in a "traditional Portuguese" style, far from a more urban search for understanding the space that is expressed at the time mainly by an imported beaux-arts style.

=== 1930's ===
The 1930s characterized the modernism appearance in the Avenue, with Art Nouveau and Art Deco languages introduced in more geometric elements in the façades, increasing the height of the buildings to three to four floors.

An example of this style is the Álvaro Dias de Melo Building, with commercial use on the first floor and housing on the second floor. The entrance was made by a transition space – a colored glass gallery over the entrance door. The dwelling was developed in two bodies and in two directions: the noble part of the house, the bedrooms and the rooms parallel to the street, in the main body; the kitchen, pantry, and toilet in a small body, perpendicular to the other. The connection of the house to the plot, the backyard, was guaranteed, since this was almost at the same level as the Americano Street. Regarding the elevation, the design is only more geometrized, and the elements are maintained: the positioning of the openings, the pediment marking the axis of symmetry and the platband.

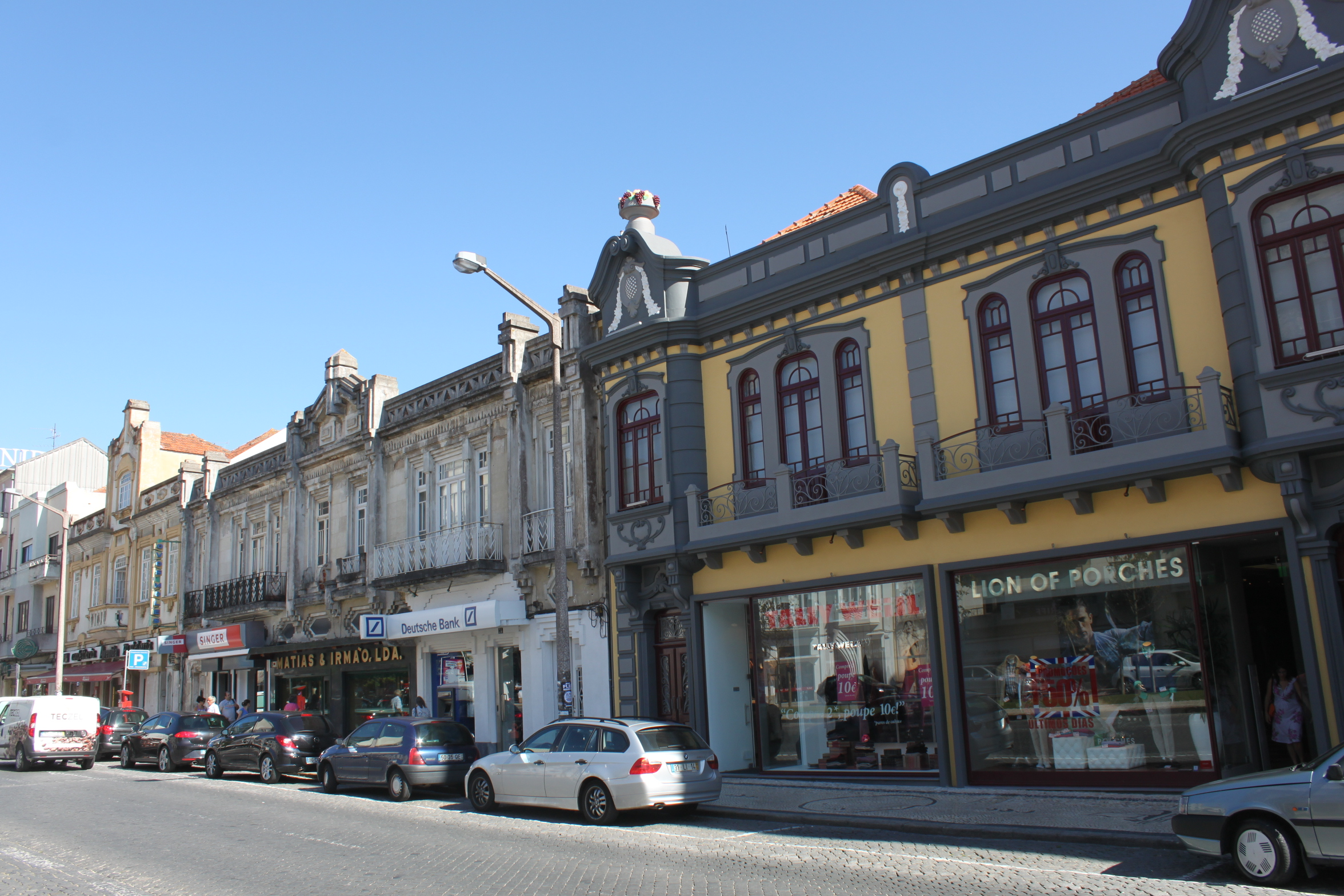
The buildings Pastelaria Avenida (left), Ourivesaria Matia (center) and Casa Paris (right).

Built starting in 1932, the buildings that make up the Ensemble of Public Interest (Conjunto de Interesse Público – CIP) Casa Paris, Pastelaria Avenida and Ourivesaria Matias are some of the best examples of Art Deco and Art Nouveau architecture that still exist on the Avenue:

- Casa Paris – Built between 1932 and 1933 and traditionally attributed to the architect Francisco Rocha. Although the authorship of this building is not officially confirmed, this presumption results from its proximity to the Casa Silva Rocha, designed by this architect and located at numbers 12 to 14 on Carmo Street. In the Casa Paris, it can be seen how the sober structure receives a careful decoration, present in the wrought iron railings, in the balcony windows, or in the stonework and window sill, with floral motifs topped by bulbous vases. The side doors, in stonework, seem to support the protruding bodies of the upper floor. It currently houses two commercial spaces (Tally Weijl and Lion of Porches). In stark contrast to this building, the others show a geometric decoration, with straight lines and without many decorative details.
- Pastelaria Avenida (also known as Pastelaria Ramos) – The cornice is interrupted by the central body, higher due to the existence of an attic. A balcony window, with a stone balcony, and geometrically decorated railing stand out on the second floor.
- Ourivesaria Matias (also known as the Jaime Rodrigues Building) – Built in 1933, it displays a central body, limited by grooved and protruding pilasters. The cornice is decorated with geometric V-shaped elements, just like the railing of the balcony windows. Its greatest innovation lies in the interesting decoration of the façade, in a quite worked Art Deco, despite the more or less provincial expression, that is marking of openings and friezes, crowning of the cornice, marking elements in a more or less traditionalist way, similar to the Português Suave. It currently houses on the first floor a Singer repair center, an optical center and a banking establishment.

In 1937, the Alfredo Esteves Building was built, one of the most striking buildings on the Avenue, as it is located in a corner next to the monument to the Soldado Desconhecido. This Building is characterized by low-relief geometric designs in the balconies and spans. The first floor was occupied by commercial use, where the Café Avenida was installed in 1943 (currently houses a branch of Novo Banco). On the remaining floors, the predominant use was residential. On the first floor of this Building, operated the Café Trianon, where they held social gatherings. With the country's economic changes, this was another commercial space that was replaced by a bank agency. It is a modernist building, which was associated with the modernity aspect of the Avenue, as many other modernist buildings later appeared.

=== 1940s ===
The 1940s was marked by the aesthetic concern of buildings and urban space, with the Avenue becoming a public promenade.

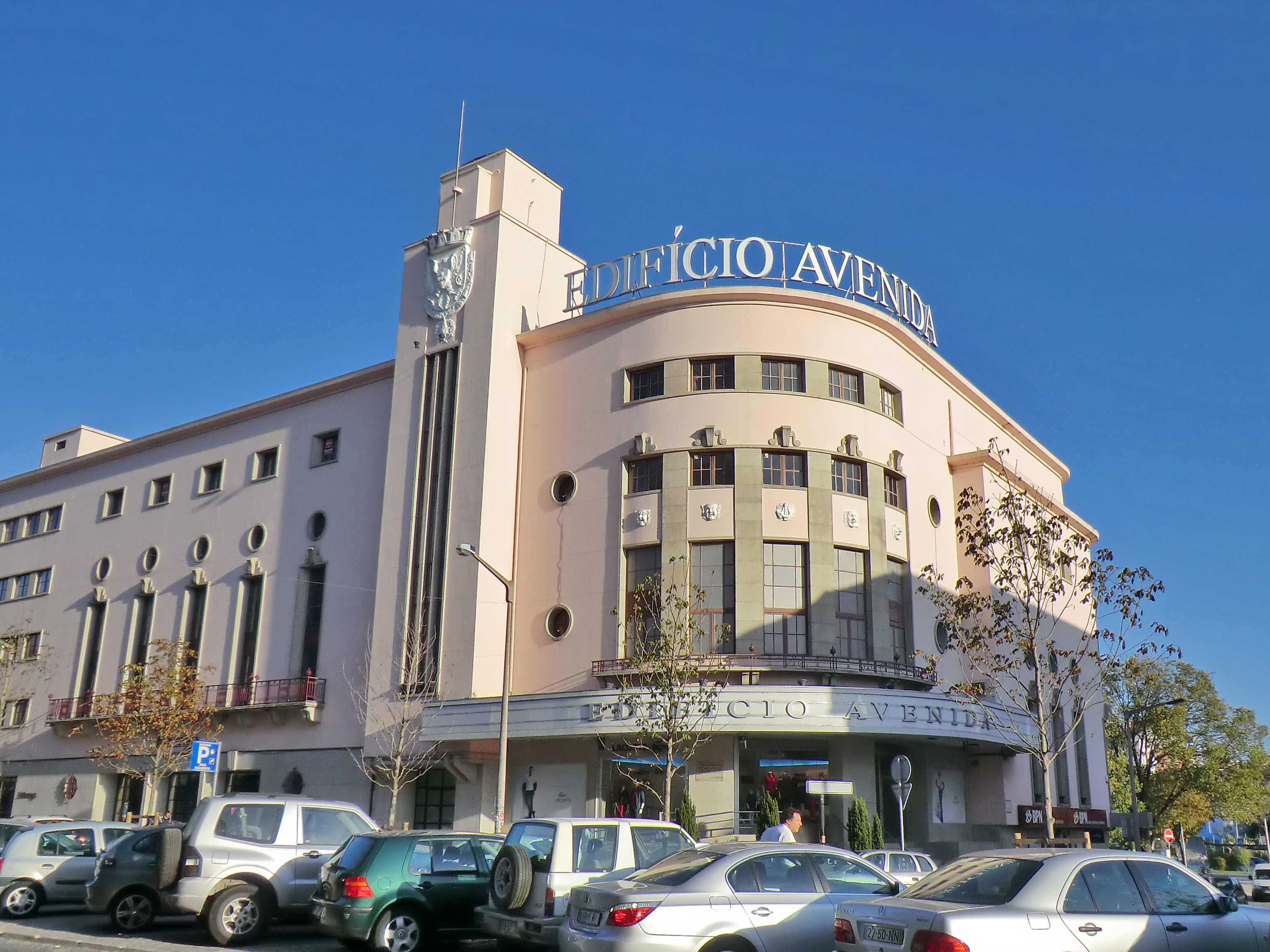
Appearance of the former Cine-Teatro Avenida in 2011.

The Cine-Teatro Avenida, built between 1945 and 1949, designed by the architect Raúl Rodrigues Lima, was implanted in the Avenue, over the demolition of another building. It is a building of the Português Suave style with symmetrical rhythmic marking of the spans and with horizontal and vertical volumes. The performance hall had a capacity for 1,400 spectators, according to the second page of weekly newspaper O Democrata of 1949:

"The show room holds 1,400 people who can be distributed by the audience, first and second balconies and four boxes. It is all in modern lines with high ceilings, indirect light, and there are several halls, among which the party room on the second floor stands out, exquisitely decorated, with a sculpture in the middle (...) and a chandelier and monumental gate where one can admire the happy combination of wrought iron art with ceramic motifs from Fábricas Aleluia. (...) There are several bars and numerous crystal chandeliers made in Alcobaça, Portugal. The carpets and rugs are very rich. The stewed furniture is extremely comfortable. In the show room, on the proscenium and on the side walls there are artistic works by the Aveirense sculptor Euclides Vaz (...). Elsewhere in the building there are compositions by the Spanish sculptor Ruano. Outside, one can notice a composition of modern architecture, but without any exaggeration of reinforced concrete (...) One can see iron balconies, windows and circular openings, breaking the monotony of the big walls in a happy combination of the current taste, with memories of national styles (...). The sound was the subject of a special project, the neon tubes and fluorescent lighting of beautiful effect."

In 1986, this building was transformed into a plastic arts exhibition hall, and later, a bingo room and a children's amusement theme park. It is currently occupied by retail, on the first floors, and by the Avenida Café Concerto, on the upper floors, in a return to its originally designed function.

The José Videira Building, built between 1947 and 1949, by Alberto Pessoa, was designed as a modern and rational building, with careful and clean design, but assuming and integrating the values of Portuguese tradition. The typology is the most common on the Avenue, that is, commerce on the first floor and housing on the other two floors, with one apartment in each. The reading of the Building from the outside was, however, distinct from the others. The establishments were discreet, not following the trend of the time of being announced by protrusions. This Building has undergone several changes, the most obvious being at the level of the first floor, with the complete transformation of the design of the openings of the storefronts and doors, and the change of the coating that currently, even chromatically, is out of step with the whole. On the other floors, the change has to do with the frames and the disappearance of the shutters which, as mentioned, were an important element in the design. An additional floor was also recently added, with a terrace.

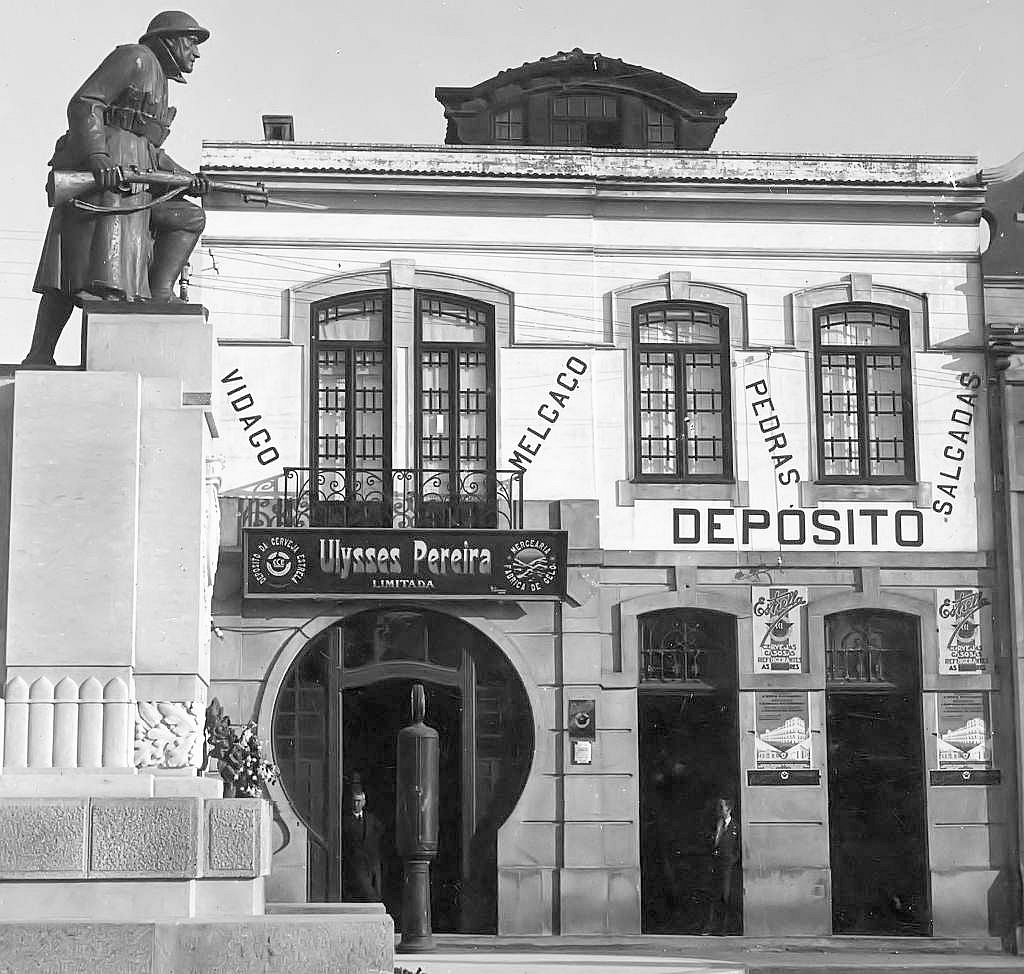
Soldado Desconhecido, in front of Ulisses Pereira's building, demolished for the construction of the Banco de Portugal.

The Banco de Portugal Building, built between 1947 and 1953 and designed by architect Manuel da Rocha Casquilho, came about after the demolition of two buildings when the Avenue was opened. In one of them was the headquarters of the Clube Mário Duarte and the Padaria Bijou, in the other, the Ulisses Pereira establishment. It is a neoclassical building, with an expressive degree of monumentality and characterizing the power of the state. The Building was used for the residence of two managers, for storages and for the banking facilities. The storerooms were in the basement, which is the foundation of the Building. On the first floor were the banking facilities, accessed by a staircase of two symmetrical spans, of very elaborate architecture, which gives access to the hall of the Bank where visitors are confronted with a large vaulted glass dome that transmits direct luminosity to the entire banking building, because it crosses its double height, moving us to a nobility of extreme distinction of the interior of the Building. The two rooms were on the second floor in the north and south wing, and the main façade of the Building is composed of sculptures, a triangular pediment, and an interrupted pediment over the door.

When this branch of the Banco de Portugal closed in 1994, the services of the Aveiro Tax Authority began to operate in this building. In 2019, it was announced that the same building would soon be converted into a five-star hotel.

Another important landmark in the modernist architecture of the city of Aveiro, and specifically the Avenue, were the garages. The concentration of this type of buildings, in the space of Dr. Lourenço Peixinho Avenue in the 1940s, was justified by its centrality and because this artery is associated with an idea of modernity, architectural and urban, which is relevant in this context.

In the case of the Garagem Trindade, the transition to a modern architecture took place in 1945, with a project to expand the existing space. The Garagem Trindade occupied two buildings from the beginning of the century that, although connected, had a different architecture, one accusing more the function than the other and with different number of floors. Coinciding with its anniversary, the remodeling took place: it was intended that the new building would have a dignified façade and evidence of the 40 years of development and progress of this company. The change was mainly related to modifications to the façade and the inclusion of new floors, creating a new image for the whole within a perspective of economy. This building has since been demolished.

In 1948, the construction of a new modernist garage began on the Avenue: the Garagem Central, by the firm Vieira, Tavares e Cª, Lda, which appeared to respond to the increase of traffic in Aveiro. Its image is marked by the high tower, which modernly marked its presence in the space of the Avenue. This vertical marking element was created in a higher side body arranged asymmetrically in relation to the other, more horizontal. This body, the main one, was quite simple, with a large glazing. It was separate from the first floor and detached from the ground by a protrusion over the entrance area. The lettering participated in the design of the elevation. In terms of interior organization, this building took advantage of the difference in elevation of the two streets it served: the Avenue and Voluntários Guilherme Gomes Fernandes Street. Two entrances were created on different floors, connected by an interior ramp. This building, like the previous one, no longer exists.

The Garagem Atlantic, built in 1948, is the only example of a garage on the Avenue that has stood the test of time, as an example of modernist architecture. The Garage has a tower that makes its vertical mark and divides the building into two bodies of different height. The first floor is separated and marked by a protrusion that separates it from the glazed upper floor. The name of the building is part of the elevation design and the materials used were marble in the external footers and plaster in the elevation area.

=== 1950's ===
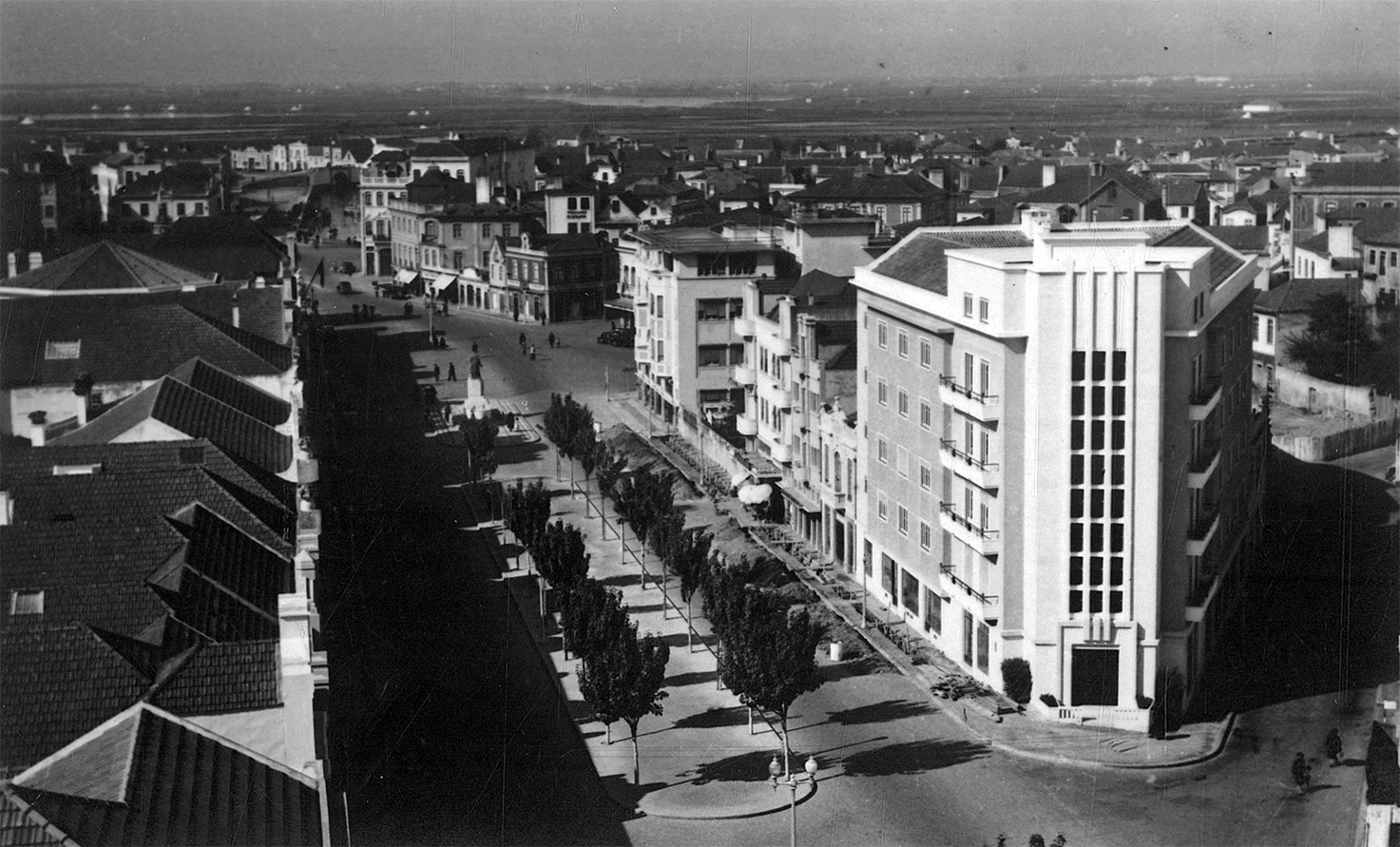
Companhia de Seguros Ultramarina Building, seen from the top of Cine-Teatro Avenida. The first elevator in Aveiro was installed in this Building.

Between 1951 and 1952, the Companhia de Seguros Ultramarina Building was built, designed by architect Luiz Bevilacqua and located in the corner between the Avenue and Agostinho Pinheiro Street. It was a very modern building, advanced in relation to what was being built in the city, which would serve as headquarters to the Aveiro branch of the Companhia de Seguros Ultramarina. Its urban insertion was intelligent, taking advantage of its location in a narrow corner and exploiting this characteristic, placing at the apex the entrance and vertical access, stairs and elevator, the first in the city of Aveiro. The lot is triangular in shape, facing the Avenue and also the Agostinho Pinheiro Street. The Building would occupy the exterior of the lot, drawing a lobby in the central part, allowing for ventilation and lighting of the kitchens, corridors and sanitary areas. This Building had two main bodies, with a façade for each of the streets that limited the plot, and another that established the connection, where the service areas were still located. Designed with seven floors, including a basement for storage, the first floor was for stores, the second floor for offices, the second, third and fourth floors for housing, and the fifth for storage and housing the concierge.

Today, this Building is occupied by the Companhia de Seguros Fidelidade on the ground level and by housing and services on the upper floors. Most of the original elements remain, including the metal ornaments of the balconies and the iron gate with the initials CSU (Companhia de Seguros Ultramarina). The elevator (a pioneer in the city) has since been replaced, although the metal railings around the current unit remain.

The Benjamim Marques da Silva and Manuel Bastos Xavier Buildings were built in the middle of the decade, being located at the eastern end of the Avenue, near the railway station. They resulted from a joint proposal of the owners of the two plots of land, prepared by the architect Alfredo Ângelo Magalhães. The specificity of its location, with façades on three sides (Avenue, Comandante Rocha Cunha Street and Estação Square), together with the irregular configuration of the lots, would condition the solution presented for the complex. This would be extremely compact, taking advantage almost entirely of the available land area. It was a set of urban image and nature, where a will to make a city was expressed, either by the relationship with the street, or by its characteristic as a townhouse. The modernity of the approach to the building's program corresponded to a modern language, in accordance with the architecture that was being practiced at the time in the rest of the country. The formal richness of the set (still existing) comes from the plasticity of the concrete itself, from plastic applications with the materials, the textures and shadows, without neglecting the careful, rational and rigorous design at its base.

The Fernando e Manuel Matos Lima Building was built in 1958, according to a project by architect Américo Augusto dos Santos Malta. It was a six-story building, at the entrance of Alberto Souto Street, in continuity with the urban front started at west. This Building included several situations that enhance its plastic vigor. Like the Companhia de Seguros Ultramarina Building, this one was located in a corner, which are usually treated in a special way in the Avenue, and which gave it some urban importance. It was designed to accommodate three functions: commercial, services and housing. This division was accomplished through using volumes, essential distinctive element of this Building, base of its architecture, defining several bodies: on the first floor, a transparent and curved volume that, by its situation in corner, defined the commercial area and established the relationship with the street; an element, reading a thick visor, followed the curve and covers this area, separating it from the offices and forming a kind of balcony; the housing part was developed with a distinct volumetry, parallel to the street, although away from the relationship with them. The whole was cut by the body of the stairs, which was treated as an independent element, with immense volumetric and plastic strength. This softened the mass of the Building.

=== 1960 to present ===
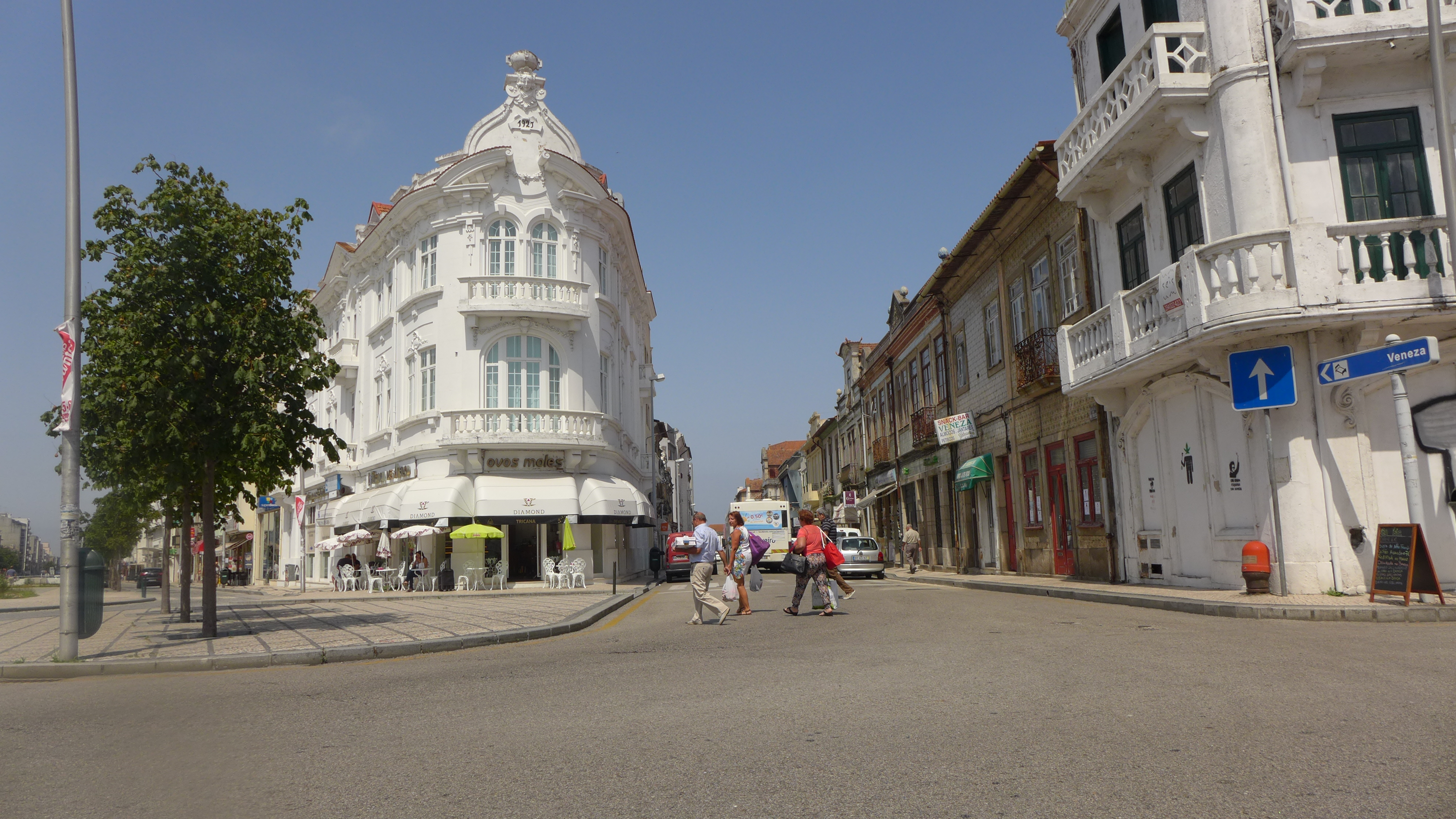
Current view of the Estação Square.

From the 1960s on, there was a noticeable change in the type of buildings that were constructed on the Avenue, and some previous buildings were also demolished, to comply with the 1964 PDM. Preferably, new buildings should have between four and five floors.

The Aristides Leite Ferreira Building, designed in the previous decade (1956) by Moreira da Silva, comprised a first floor for commercial establishments and four floors for housing. At the sidewalk level, the commercial part was used to allow the creation of a dignified entrance and two establishments of distinct characteristics: one with generous dimensions, allowing the installation of a car dealership; and another for a less bulky branch. The four dwellings had equal floor plans, one of them being destined for the owner's residence. The entrance to the Building was set back from the street, creating a transition space. Within the living space, distinct zones were created: the service area, served by the rear façade; the public common areas were located near the entrance; the private areas faced the main façade. The design of the main façade was asymmetrical and quite rational, and the advancement of the balconies in relation to the wall cloth (as much as the protrusions) created movement in the elevation and gave it a quite modern aspect.

In 1969, a new project was submitted for alterations to this Building, enlarging it by two floors (one of them set back three meters from the alignment). These changes came in response to the 1964 PDM, which promoted the construction of seven-story buildings on the Avenue.

This would be the first building on this block to follow these premises, since next door there were still the houses set back from the street. The remaining lots changed their characteristics starting in 1965. From this year on, a strong urban front began to emerge, whose characteristics obeyed the indications of the PDM in terms of height and type of occupation, although the construction took place before this was officially approved.

The Casa José de Sousa Oliveira was demolished at this time. In its place an urban building with seven floors appeared (one of them set back), which formed a set with the building located to the west (João Francisco do Casal Building). Its façades were coordinated and its most distinctive mark is the portico on the first floor. This solution was initially rejected, but, with a modification of the module in order to make it regular, it was finally realized. However, from the report, it can be seen that the portico solution was even considered for the plan of the Avenue, but had to be abandoned because it was not possible to ensure this continuity along it, due to the compromise with the already existing important buildings.

In parallel with the PDM guidelines, there was also a great concern of the Aveiro Municipal Chamber regarding the design of the elevations, in order to obtain an overall image with the neighboring buildings, namely at the level of the height of the roofs and ridges.

The urban densification of the Avenue, which began in the 1960s, continued in the following years until the present day. Some of the original buildings on the avenue were sacrificed during this process, in an evolution similar to that of many arteries with the same characteristics in the country. On the one hand, the economic growth that began in the late 1970s intensified commercial, administrative, and service life. On the other hand, the appreciation of land prices gave rise to speculative operations that resulted in the outsourcing of these arteries. Thus, they ceased to be predominantly residential spaces and became important hubs for commercial activities and work in general.

== Points of Interest ==
=== Monuments ===
- Manuel Maria Moreira Building, 1923 – Monument of Public Interest (MIP – 2013);
- Monument to the Dead of the Great War (also known as the Soldado Desconhecido), 1934;
- Bust in honor of Lourenço Simões Peixinho, 1952.

=== Architecture ===
- Capitaincy of Porto de Aveiro Building (current Aveiro Municipal Assembly headquarters) – Public Interest Property (Imóvel de Interesse Público – IIP);
- Vivenda Lígia, 1923;
- Set of buildings Casa Paris, Pastelaria Avenida and Ourivesaria Matias, built in 1933; – Public Interest Building (IIP – 2003);
- Família Candal Building;
- Avenida Building (former Avenida Cine-Teatro), 1949;
- Companhia de Seguros Ultramarina Building, 1952;
- Banco de Portugal Building, 1953;

=== Commerce and services ===
- Railway station, 1864;
- Municipal Library;

== See also ==
- History of rail transport in Portugal
- Portuguese architecture
- Art Nouveau in Portugal
- Português Suave architecture

== Bibliography ==
- Amorim, Marta Félix (2014). Avenida Lourenço Peixinho. Transformação sobre o consolidado (Thesis) (in Portuguese). FAUP.
- Carvalho, Jorge (2013). Proposta para a qualificação da Avenida Doutor Lourenço Peixinho (in Portuguese). Aveiro.
- Cruz, Sara Alves Pereira Ventura da (2005). A Arquitectura da Avenida. A Construção da Avenida Dr. Lourenço Peixinho em Aveiro (in Portuguese). Coimbra: FCTUC.
- Ferreira, Fausto de Matos Melo (1990). Boletim Municipal de Aveiro (in Portuguese) (15th–16th ed.). Aveiro.
- Matias, Lídia Maria Moreira (2013). "Transformações e integração derivadas da mudança de uso do espaço urbano na cidade de Aveiro, Portugal". V Seminario Internacional de Investigación en Urbanismo, Barcelona-Buenos Aires (in Portuguese). Instituto de Arte Americano. Universidad de Buenos Aires: 753–770. DOI: 10.5821/siiu.5860.
- Plano Director da Cidade de Aveiro (in Portuguese). Aveiro: Câmara Municipal de Aveiro. 1964.
- Santos, Luísa (2018). PEDUCA – Revitalização e Qualificação da Avenida Lourenço Peixinho (in Portuguese). Aveiro: Câmara Municipal de Aveiro.
