= D. António Francisco dos Santos Bridge =

D. António Francisco dos Santos Bridge Ponte de Dom António Francisco dos Santos
- Coordinates: 41.1393583°N 8.5915748°W
- Crosses: Rio Douro
- Locale: Porto, between the City of Porto proper and Vila Nova de Gaia
- Official name: Ponte de Dom António Francisco dos Santos

The D. António Francisco dos Santos Bridge (Portuguese: Ponte D. António Francisco dos Santos) is a proposed bridge that will span the River Douro between the cities of Porto and Vila Nova de Gaia in Portugal. Following a meeting between Porto and Vila Nova de Gaia councils, it was agreed in 2018 to build a seventh bridge over the Douro river and name it after the former bishop of Porto António Francisco dos Santos.
