= Manuel d'Almeida Trindade =

- Bishop of Diocese of Aveiro (Emeritus)
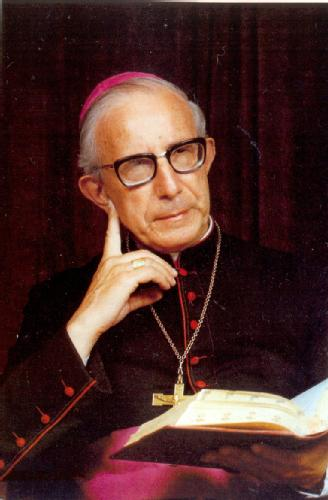
- Manuel d'Almeida Trindade
- Church: Roman Catholic Church
- See: Diocese of Aveiro
- In office: 1962–1988
- Predecessor: Domingos da Apresentação Fernandes
- Successor: António Baltasar Marcelino
- Previous post: Priest

Orders
- Ordination: December 21, 1942

Personal details
- Born: April 20, 1918 Monsanto, Portugal
- Died: August 5, 2008 (aged 90)

Manuel d'Almeida Trindade (April 24, 1918 – August 5, 2008) was a Portuguese Prelate of the Roman Catholic Church.

Trindade was born in Monsanto, Portugal and was ordained a priest on December 21, 1942. Trindade was appointed bishop of the Diocese of Aveiro, on September 19, 1962, and ordained bishop on December 19, 1962. Trindade retired from the Diocese of Aveiro on January 20, 1988.

Trindade died at the age of 90 on August 5, 2008.

== See also ==
- Diocese of Aveiro
