= Cathedral of Aveiro =

Cathedral in Aveiro, Portugal

Coordinates: 40°38′23″N 8°39′01″W

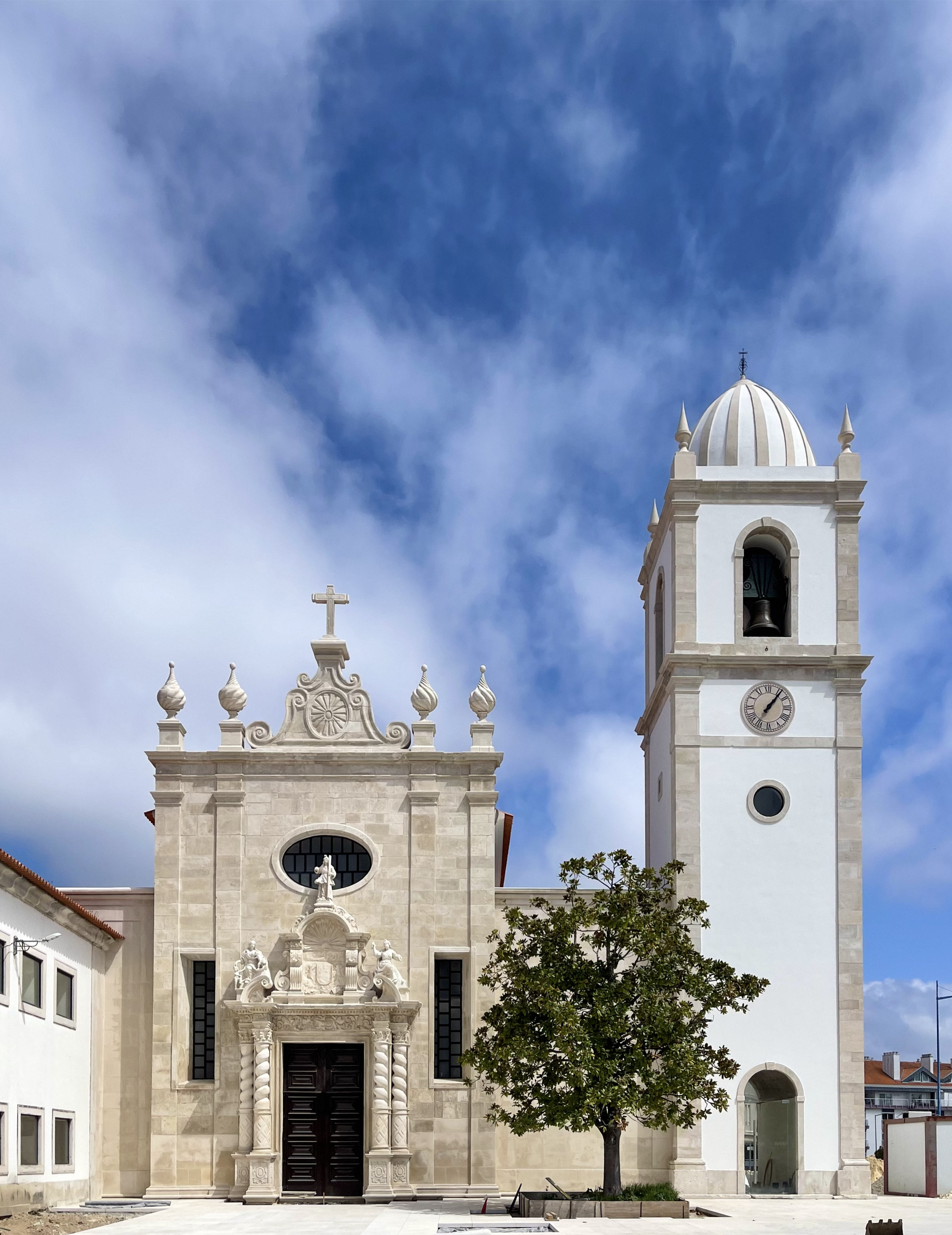
Cathedral of Aveiro (Sé de Aveiro) in 2024

The Cathedral of Aveiro (Portuguese: Sé de Aveiro), also known as the Church of St. Dominic (Portuguese: Igreja de São Domingos), is a Roman Catholic cathedral in Aveiro, Portugal. It is the seat of the Diocese of Aveiro and built in Portuguese Baroque. It was founded in 1423 as a Dominican convent. Since 6 March 1996, it is on the register of National monuments of Portugal.
