= António Francisco dos Santos =

Portuguese bishop (1948–2017)

His Excellency, the Right Reverend António Francisco dos Santos
- Bishop of Porto
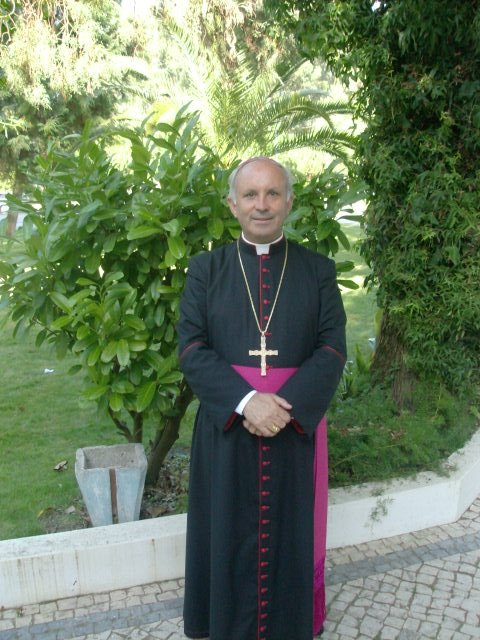
- Bishop Antonio Francisco dos Santos
- Diocese: Porto
- Installed: 21 December 2004
- Term ended: 11 September 2017
- Predecessor: Manuel Clemente
- Successor: Manuel Linda
- Previous post: Bishop of Aveiro

Orders
- Ordination: 8 December 1972
- Consecration: 19 March 2005 by Jacinto Botelho

Personal details
- Born: 21 February 1948
- Died: 11 September 2017 (aged 69) Porto, Portugal
- Denomination: Roman Catholic
- Motto: In manus Tuas
- Coat of arms

António Francisco dos Santos (21 February 1948 – 11 September 2017) was a Roman Catholic bishop.

Ordained to the priesthood in 1972, Santos served as auxiliary bishop of the Archbishop of Braga, Portugal, from 2004 to 2006. He then served as bishop of the Diocese of Aveiro from 2006 to 2014 and as bishop of the Diocese of Porto from 2014 until his death.

Following a meeting between the Porto and Vila Nova de Gaia councils, both councils agreed to build a seventh bridge over the Douro river and name it D. António Francisco dos Santos Bridge.
