= Cathedral of Coimbra =

Cathedral of Coimbra can refer either of two cathedrals:

- The Old Cathedral of Coimbra
- The New Cathedral of Coimbra
