= Goldrofe of Arganil =

Portuguese saint

Saint Goldrofe of Arganil
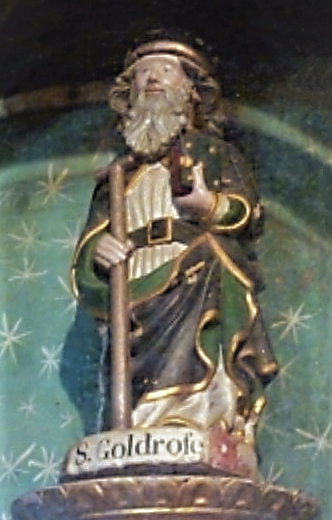
- Gothic image of Saint Goldrofe in the Monastery of Folques, in Arganil

Prior
- Born: 11th century AD
- Died: 4 February, c. 1098; Arganil, County of Portugal
- Canonized: 1170, by Miguel Pais Salomão, Bishop of Coimbra (Cultus confirmed by Pope Pius VI c. 1791)
- Major shrine: Monastery of Folques
- Feast: 4 February
- Tradition or genre: Augustinians

Goldrofe of Arganil CRSA (Portuguese: São Goldrofe or Goldofre, alternatively, Golfredo or Guelindrofe; fl. 1086) was a Portuguese Augustinian prior in what is today central Portugal. He is venerated as a saint in the Roman Catholic Church as well as by some in the Eastern Orthodox Church.

== Life ==
Very little is known about the life of Goldrofe. He served as the first prior of the Monastery of Saint Peter, in Arganil; the earliest documental evidence of both the monastery and Goldrofe dates to 1086, when nobleman Vermudo Pais (Vermudus Paes) and his wife Elvira Draíz left their properties in Folques in their will to Goldrofe and his religious community ("Sancto viro Goldrofo priori de Arganil, et Clericis ejus Religiosis"). The Monastery of Saint Peter would be transferred in 1190, after Goldrofe's death, to these lands, where it remains to this day.

== Legacy ==
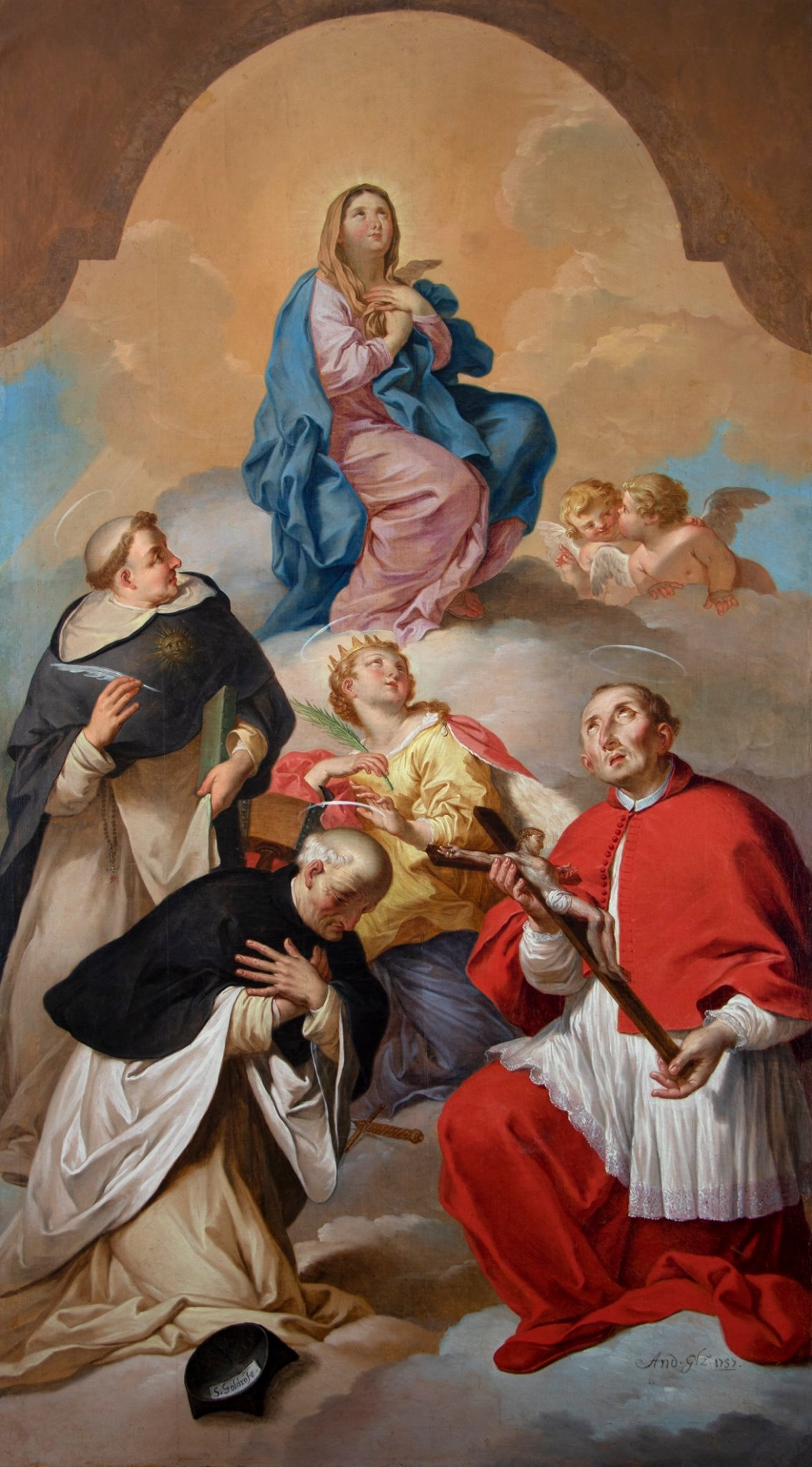
Our Lady of Consolation with Saints Catherine of Alexandria, Thomas Aquinas, Goldrofe of Arganil, and Charles Borromeo, 1757, by André Gonçalves

Goldrofe died around 1098, with a reputation for sanctity; after miraculous cures soon after started to be attributed to his intercession, he began to be invoked against malignant fevers and other ailments. Goldrofe was canonised in 1170 by Miguel Pais Salomão, Bishop of Coimbra, when Salomão himself was instantly healed from a grave malady that had afflicted him after praying with great devotion over Goldrofe's grave; at the time, bishops had the authority to canonise faithful people in their dioceses.

In 1190, when the Monastery of Saint Peter was transferred from Arganil to Folques, the remains of Goldrofe were exhumed for reburial at the new building. The body was found to be incorrupt and exuding the odour of sanctity. The remains were put in a wooden coffin and laid under the main altar of the monastery; by the request of the Prior and Canons of the Monastery, Bishop Martinho Gonçalves had one of Goldrofe's shinbones removed and exposed for public veneration as a relic — it became a popular devotion to use this relic to bless water to give the sick.

Following the reforms of Pope Urban VIII on the process of beatification and canonisation (Sanctissimus Dominus Noster, 1625 and Caelestis Hierusalem cives, 1634), Bishop-Count Miguel da Anunciação opened a formal inquiry onto the canonisation of Goldrofe in 1758, which was only concluded in 1791; the documents are kept in Torre do Tombo National Archive, in Lisbon.
