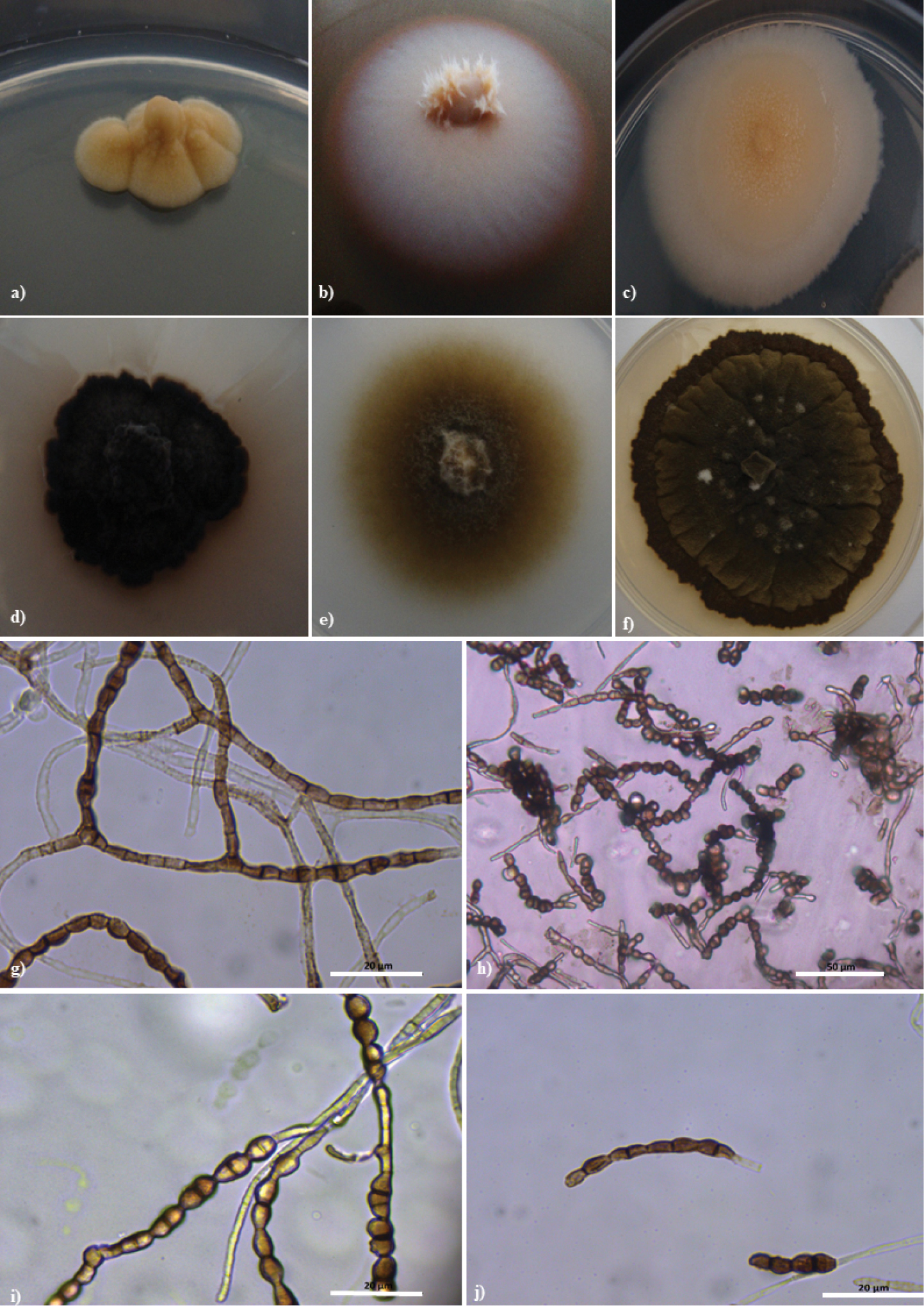

Scientific classification
- Kingdom: Fungi
- Division: Ascomycota
- Class: Dothideomycetes
- Order: Capnodiales
- Family: Aeminiaceae
- Genus: Aeminium; J.Trovão, I.Tiago & A.Portugal
- Species: A. ludgeroi

Binomial name
- Aeminium ludgeroi J. Trovão, I. Tiago & A. Portugal

= Aeminium ludgeroi =

Genus of fungi

Aeminium is a genus of fungi within the family Aeminiaceae.

The genus is named after Aeminium, the Roman name of the city of Coimbra in Portugal, as the first species was first isolated from artwork in the Old Cathedral of Coimbra. A single species is known: Aeminium ludgeroi.

The Old Cathedral of Coimbra, from which the type species (Aeminium ludgeroi) was isolated.
