= Arganil =

Town of Arganil
- Municipality
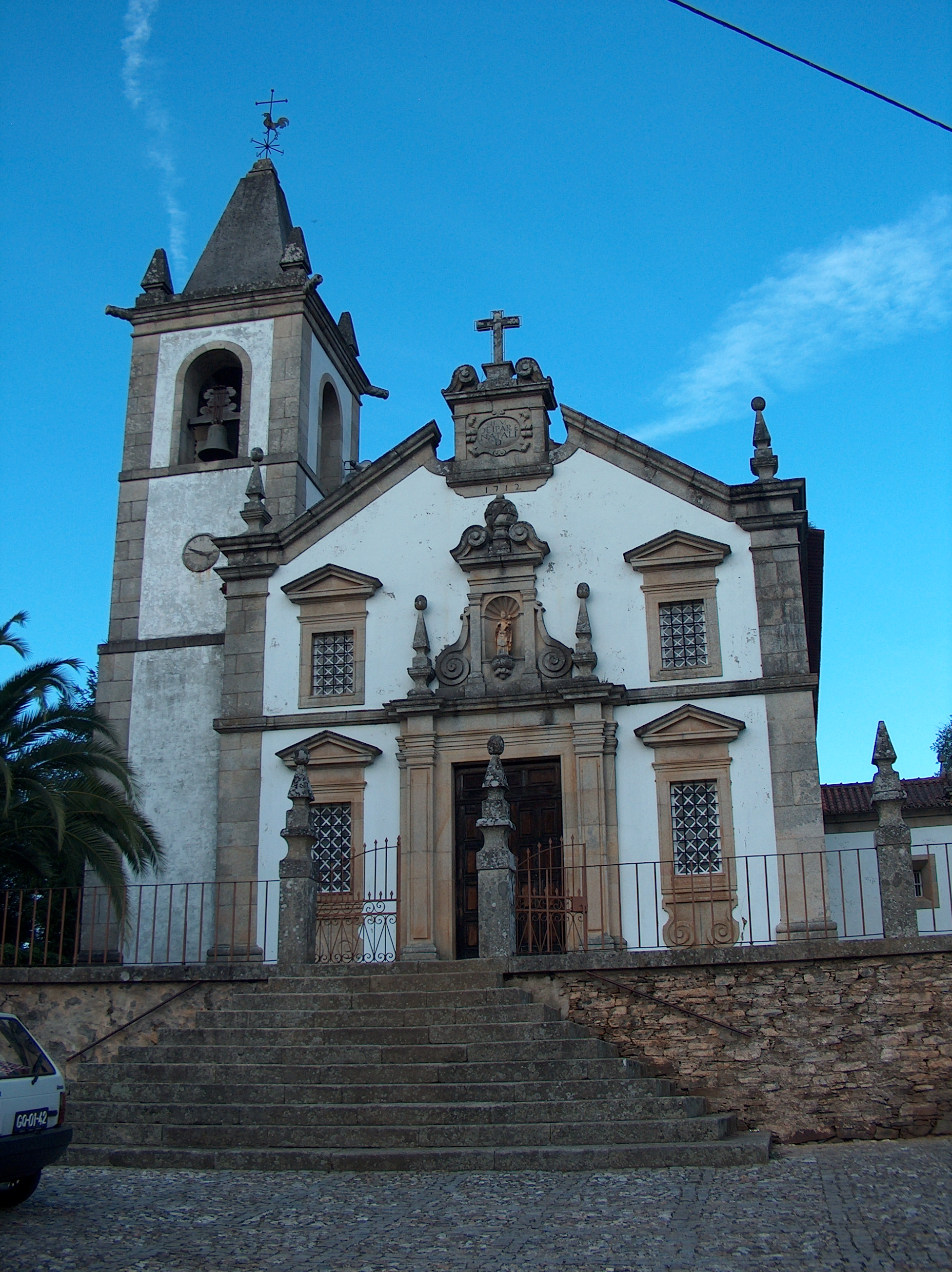
- Parish Church of Vila Cova do Alva

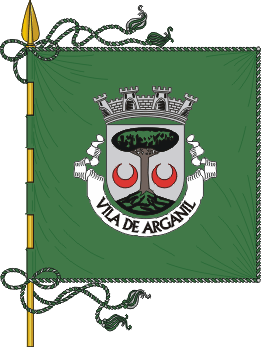
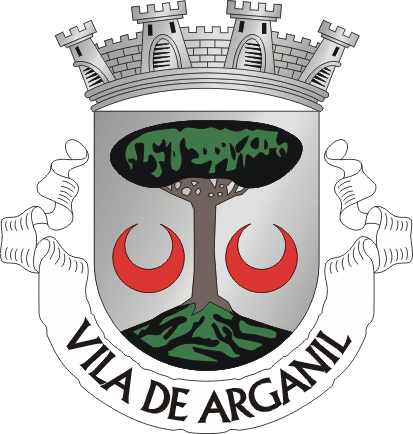
- Flag Coat of arms
- Interactive map of Town of Arganil
- Location in Portugal
- Coordinates: 40°13′N 8°03′W
- Country: Portugal
- Region: Centro
- Intermunic. comm.: Região de Coimbra
- District: Coimbra
- Parishes: 14

Government
  - President: Luís Paulo Costa (PSD)

Area
  - Total: 332.84 km^{2} (128.51 sq mi)

Population (2011)
  - Total: 12,145
  - Density: 36.489/km^{2} (94.506/sq mi)
- Time zone: UTC+00:00 (WET)
  - Summer (DST): UTC+01:00 (WEST)
- Local holiday: September 7
- Website: www.cm-arganil.pt

Arganil (pronounced [ɐɾɣɐˈnil]), officially the Town of Arganil (Portuguese: Vila de Arganil), is a town and municipality in Coimbra District, in Portugal. The population of the municipality in 2011 was 12,145, in an area of 332.84 km^{2}. The present mayor is Luís Paulo Costa, elected by the Social Democratic Party. The municipal holiday is September 7.

== History ==
The oldest traces of the history of the concelho (municipality) of Arganil are located in Lomba do Canho and the dolmen known as Dolmem dos Moinhos de Vento, very close to the town of Arganil. By the chronology of its construction and occupation, centered on the second and third quarters of the first century BC, well before the creation of the province of Lusitania, the military installation of Lomba do Canho corresponds to a phase of appropriation of the territory by the Romans. Not already the beginning of the conquest and submission of local populations, but a second moment of control and exploitation of resources, under the surveillance of a military garrison. Also in Côja (or Coja) it is possible to discover some occupation in older times.

The auriferous riches of the river Alva and Ribeira da Mata, whose exploration since ancient times are recognized by multiple testimonies in its margins, have been a factor in attracting people to this region, located in a nodal point of the road network.

The remains of the Roman era found in Coja are not many, nor very significant. Those that are known, mainly located along the road that came from Coimbra (called Aeminium by then) passing through Lomba do Canho, Quinta do Mosteiro, Lomba dos Palheiros (Vale Moleiro), Vale de Carro, Senhora da Ribeira, Coja, bordered the Rio Alva, in Coja and headed north to Bobadela and/or northeast towards Castro de S. Romão (Seia), seem to correspond to buildings related to the exploitation of gold resources in the Rio Alva. We know that the western part of Serra da Estrela was, during dozens of years, a frontier zone. Probably it was, until the end of the XI century, a no man's land. The inhabitants would be the indigenous people, descendants of the Lusitanians, who survived the hardships of war. They would be a group of free men who populate this territory.

But as the territory becomes organized, attention inevitably turns to this area which is presented as an entrance to the 8th century Muslim incursions in the interior. Thus appear the first documents that prove actions carried out in order to organize the territory, building castles, occupying land, settling people.

From the XII century we know some names like the Frenchman Uzberto, Anaia Vestrariz, Randulfo Soleimás, Fernão Peres de Trava who settled in this area. They are adventurous men who fight on their own and receive favors from the king for the victories achieved in the fight against the Moors. When Afonso Henriques comes to power and fights are fought with his mother Teresa, these lords lose their importance to the king, leave the court and settle in the places where they have their lands, forming there their lordships. Ecclesiastical lordships also appear. The oldest is that of Arganil, which in 1114 receives a charter given by the bishop of Coimbra Gonçalo. The castle of Coja is given by Teresa to the Bishop of Coimbra in 1122, after having belonged to Fernão Peres de Trava, who receives as compensation the castle of Santa Eulália. The Monastery of Folques, which from 1160 maintains a connection to the Canons Regular of Santa Cruz de Coimbra, plays a very important role in the social and economic development of the region, having given charter to Folques in the early thirteenth century, perhaps 1204, in addition to the charter that gave their land Fajão in 1233, Cepos in 1237 and Alvares, possibly even during the thirteenth century.

The Convent of Vila Cova de Alva appeared only in the 18th century, linked to the Franciscans of the Province of Conceição. Its founder, or main driving force, was Desembargador Luís da Costa Faria, and it was João Coelho Coluna who took charge of the monastic house. According to the ideals and the Franciscan rule, the house of Vila Cova was modest, a fact that does not invalidate the fact that its chapel was decorated with quality images and boasted a sumptuous carving. The Cathedral of Coimbra had the lordship of Arganil. In 1114 the Bishop D. Gonçalo gave its inhabitants a charter. The population was divided into jugadiers and knights villains. It was specified the rights to hunt, the parade or harvest, and the service of walkers, not forgetting to declare that the knights villains were exempt from jugada. The nature that buildings acquired from the hand of pedestrians to that of villain horsemen was determined, as well as the conditions necessary for any person to be included in this category. Throughout the charter however there is not a single circumstance that reveals the existence in Arganil, of magistrates themselves and without an addition, made in this diploma after issued, it would be nothing more than a simple civil contract. This addition, written in the name of the settlers, is as follows: "in addition to everything, we add one sexteiro to each ox so that we do not put anyone for mayor but to our satisfaction." The Manueline Foral attributed to Arganil is a parchment codex.

The copy that is in the Arganil Town Hall has had its first 5 leaves amputated, which included the title page and the multiplication table. Its codicil structure is composed of two parchment notebooks. The maximum dimensions are 250mm x 170mm, with the text box occupying 160mm x 120mm. Each sheet presents at the center at the top the Roman numerals. Besides the fixed commerce, then relatively unimportant, it should be mentioned the fair of Mon'talto, which took place between 6 and 8 September each year, and attracted traders from various parts of the country, particularly from Beira Alta and Alentejo.

This ancient fair, which had the status of a free fair, was an extraordinary event, and not only from the commercial point of view, because it completely transformed the usual rhythm and monotony of daily life in Arganil, while allowing some rare moments of distraction and leisure. The main transactions were made in the business of fancaria, gold, footwear and raw linen (a branch in which deals were made valued at 80 contos, a very high amount for the time). Equally important was the livestock fair, especially with regard to cattle, considered the "main commercial factor of this fair, usually (...) being the regulator [barometer] of the respective transactional movement". In 1902, three days before the fair started, 122 stalls had been rented for white and woolen fabrics, 23 for hat makers, 10 for fine hardware, 7 for watchmakers, 18 for goldsmiths, 20 for raw linen, 6 for boilermakers, 7 for tinsmiths, 12 for shoemakers, 50 for haberdashery, 20 for cordage, 18 for heavy ironmongery, 9 for fine ware, 30 for saragças (thick woolen cloths), and 50 botequins.

From the first half of the twentieth century begins the process of installing electric light in the municipality of Arganil. This process will go through the entire 20th century, with the last villages receiving electric light almost at the end of the century. The Hidroeléctrica de Arganil (HEA) was the only company created in the municipality of Arganil with the exclusive purpose of "exploring electrical industries". Its constitution took place on February 22, 1927, and established that the company had its headquarters in Arganil and its factory - the generating plant - at the site of Rei de Moinhos, on the border and parish of Meda de Mouros, already in the municipality (concelho) of Tábua, about 6 km from this town. If Competidora Comercial e Industrial de Arganil, Lda. was the concessionaire for the supply of electricity to the municipality of Arganil for only five years, between 1926 and 1930, HEA will take over this concession at the end of 1930 and will keep it until September 30, 1978.

=== History of the civil parishes (freguesias) ===
The administrative division of the municipality of Arganil has undergone mutations over time. It is divided into several freguesias (civil parishes).

- The Parish of Benfeita only became part of this Municipality from 1853 onwards, having until this date belonged to the extinct Municipality of Côja.
- The parish of Cerdeira only became part of this council after 1853, having until this date belonged to the extinct Council of Côja.
- The Parish of Côja only became part of this county after 1853, having until this date belonged to the extinct County of Côja.
- The Parish of Vila Cova do Alva only became part of this county after 1853, having until this date belonged to the extinct Municipality of Côja.
- The parish of Anceriz only became part of this county from 1855, by extinguishing the Municipality of Avô.
- The parish of Celavisa only became part of this Municipality after 1855.
- The parish of Piódão only became part of this Municipality after 1855, due to the extinction of the Municipality of Avô.
- The parish of Pomares only became part of this county after 1855, by extinguishing the Municipality of Avô.
- The parish of Pombeiro da Beira only became part of this Municipality after 1855, by extinguishing the Municipality of Pombeiro da Beira.
- The Parish of S. Martinho da Cortiça only became part of this Municipality after 1855 by transition from the Municipality of Tábua, where it belonged since 1853, by extinguishing the Municipality of Farinha Podre, including at that time the Parish of Paradela, which was annexed to the Municipality of Tábua in 1895 and then to Penacova in 1898.
- The parish of Teixeira only became part of this Municipality in 1855, due to the extinction of the Municipality of Fajão.
- The parish of Barril de Alva was only created in 1924, having until then belonged to the parish of Vila Cova do Alva (called Vila Cova de Sub-Avô until that date).
- The Moura da Serra parish only became part of this county from 1962, having belonged to the parish of Avô and the County of Oliveira do Hospital until this date.

With the entry into force of Law No. 11 - A/2013 of 28 January (Administrative reorganization of the territory of the parishes), the Municipality of Arganil is now composed of 10 parishes and 4 unions of parishes:

- Parishes: Arganil, Benfeita, Celavisa, Folques, Piódão, Pomares, Pombeiro da Beira, São Martinho da Cortiça, Sarzedo and Secarias
- Parish Unions: Cepos-Teixeira, Cerdeira - Moura da Serra, Côja - Barril de Alva and Vila Cova de Alva - Anceriz.

== Economy ==
The economy of the municipality of Arganil is centered on agriculture, forestry, construction and related light industry, as well as retail and services. The town has Intermarché, Lidl and Continente supermarkets.

== Parishes ==
Administratively, the municipality is divided into 14 civil parishes (freguesias):

- Arganil
- Benfeita
- Celavisa
- Cepos e Teixeira
- Cerdeira e Moura da Serra
- Coja e Barril de Alva
- Folques
- Piódão
- Pomares
- Pombeiro da Beira
- São Martinho da Cortiça
- Sarzedo
- Secarias
- Vila Cova de Alva e Anseriz

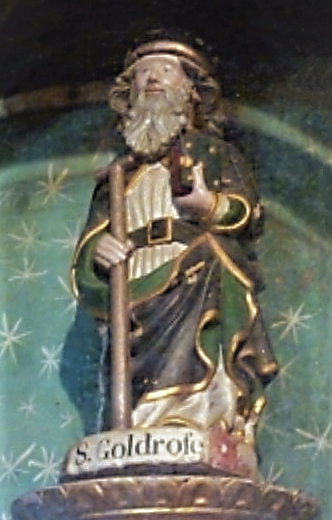
São Goldrofe

== Notable people ==
- Goldrofe of Arganil a Portuguese Augustinian prior in the Monastery of Saint Peter, (Wiki PT), in Arganil in 1086
- José Dias Ferreira (1837 in Pombeiro da Beira, Arganil – 1909, in Vidago) a Portuguese lawyer, politician and jurist
- José Simões Dias (1844 in Benfeita, Arganil – 1899) a poet, short-story writer and literary critic, as well as politician and pedagogue.
- Fernando Valle (1900 in Coja, Arganil – 2004) a phisician and politician who was one of the founders of the Socialist Party
- Francisco Lopes (born 1955 in Vila Cova de Alva, Arganil) an electrician, politician and candidate in the 2011 Portuguese presidential election
