= Eudoxia Laskarina =

Eudoxia Laskarina Asanina (Greek: Εὐδοκία Λασκαρίνα Ἀσανίνα, romanized: Evdokía Laskarina Asanina; Spanish: Eudoxia Láscaris, Nicaea, 1245/1248 – Zaragoza, 1309 or 1311), sometimes known as Laskara, was a member of the Byzantine Laskaris family. In later life, she fled to Aragon, where she was known as Irene Lascaris.

== Family ==
Eudoxia was the fourth daughter of the Nicaean emperor Theodore II Doukas Laskaris and of Elena Asenina of Bulgaria. Eudoxia grew up as a princess at the court of Nicaea, where Constance II of Hohenstaufen, widow of her grandfather John III Doukas Vatatzes, also lived. As a young girl, Eudoxia was promised to the royal family of Aragon as a bride for their son, the future king Peter III of Aragon (claim not substantiated). After the Palaiologan usurpation of the imperial throne, both ladies (dowager empress Constance and Eudokia) fled, travelling the same route from Constantinople to Tende and Sicily, respectively, and years later, both sought protection at the kingdom of Aragon under king James I.

== Marriages and offspring ==
Soon after the re-conquest of Constantinople in 1261, Michael VIII Palaiologos, until then regent and co-emperor for the infant John IV Doukas Laskaris, had himself declared sole emperor, solidifying his position by having John IV blinded and imprisoned. John's sisters, Eudoxia among them, were hurriedly married off to foreigners, so their descendants could not claim to the imperial succession.

The young Eudoxia was married in Constantinople on 28 July 1261 to Count Guglielmo Pietro I of Ventimiglia and Tenda (1230–1283), count of Ventimiglia and Tende, a Ligurian region then at the service of Genoa, allies with Michael VIII. This marriage originated the house Lascaris de Vintimille, which stood until the 19th century as a powerful French family.

Eudoxia and Pietro had seven children:

- Lucrezia Lascaris di Ventimiglia (1264 – 1314), in 1281 she married Arnau Roger de Comminges, Count of Pallars-Sobirà, who died in 1288. By this marriage she had:
  - Sibilla de Pallars, Countess of Pallars-Sobirà, married in 1297 to Hug VIII de Mataplana, Baron of Mataplana and Count Consort of Pallars-Subirà, and had two sons
  - Beatriu de Pallars, married around 1300 to Guillem IV de Anglesola, Lord of Bellpuig, who died in 1333, and had one daughter
  - Violant de Pallars (c. 1284 – 1311), married around 1300 to Ximen Cornell, widow without issue of Maria Pérez de Ayerbe, and had three sons and two daughters
  - unknown de Pallars
- Giovanni I Lascaris di Ventimiglia, Count of Ventimiglia and Tenda (1264 – c. 1323), married Menzia di Montferrato and had one son and three daughters
- Beatrice Lascaris di Ventimiglia, who married Guillem de Montcada
- Vatatza Lascaris di Ventimiglia (Ventimiglia or Aragon, 1268 or c. 1272 – Coimbra, 1336 or c. 1336, buried at the Old Cathedral of Coimbra), in the service of Queen Elizabeth of Portugal and a Maid of King Afonso IV of Portugal, Lady of the Commands of Santiago do Cacém and of Sines, married, firstly, to Martim Anes de Soverosa, who died on 30 May 1296, married, secondly, to Pedro Jordán de Urríes, who died in 1350, and who distinguished himself at the service of the Aragonese Crown in Sicily and rendered effective help to Alfonso III of Aragon before the nobles of the Union
- Giacomo Lascaris di Ventimiglia
- Otto Lascaris di Ventimiglia
- Yolanda Lascaris di Ventimiglia, married to Pedro de Ayerbe, Baron of Ayerbe, a grandson of James I of Aragon by third marriage.

Before reaching 30, Eudoxia fled from Liguria to Aragon (ca. 1278) with her daughters Beatrice and Vatatza. Some say it was at the time of her husband's death or on being refused by him. Living at Xàtiva and Zaragoza and Castella, she travelled on diplomatic missions for King James II of Aragon. While in Aragon, Eudoxia married Roger Arnau, Count of Pallars. After his death in 1288 she had an affair with admiral Bernat de Sarrià which led to her exile from the royal court.

== End of life ==
In 1296 she founded a monastery of Poor Clares and the Sanctuary of Mare de Déu de la Serra at Montblanc, which she entered by the end of 1306. She also donated to the monastery an Italian image of the Virgin, that still stands there. Her remains rest at the Dominican monastery at Zaragoza.

== Sources ==
- "Centro Studi Ventimigliani" (in Italian). Archived from the original on 20 September 2016.
