= Miguel Pais Salomão =

12th-century Portuguese bishop

Miguel Pais Salomão, O.S.C.
- Bishop of Coimbra
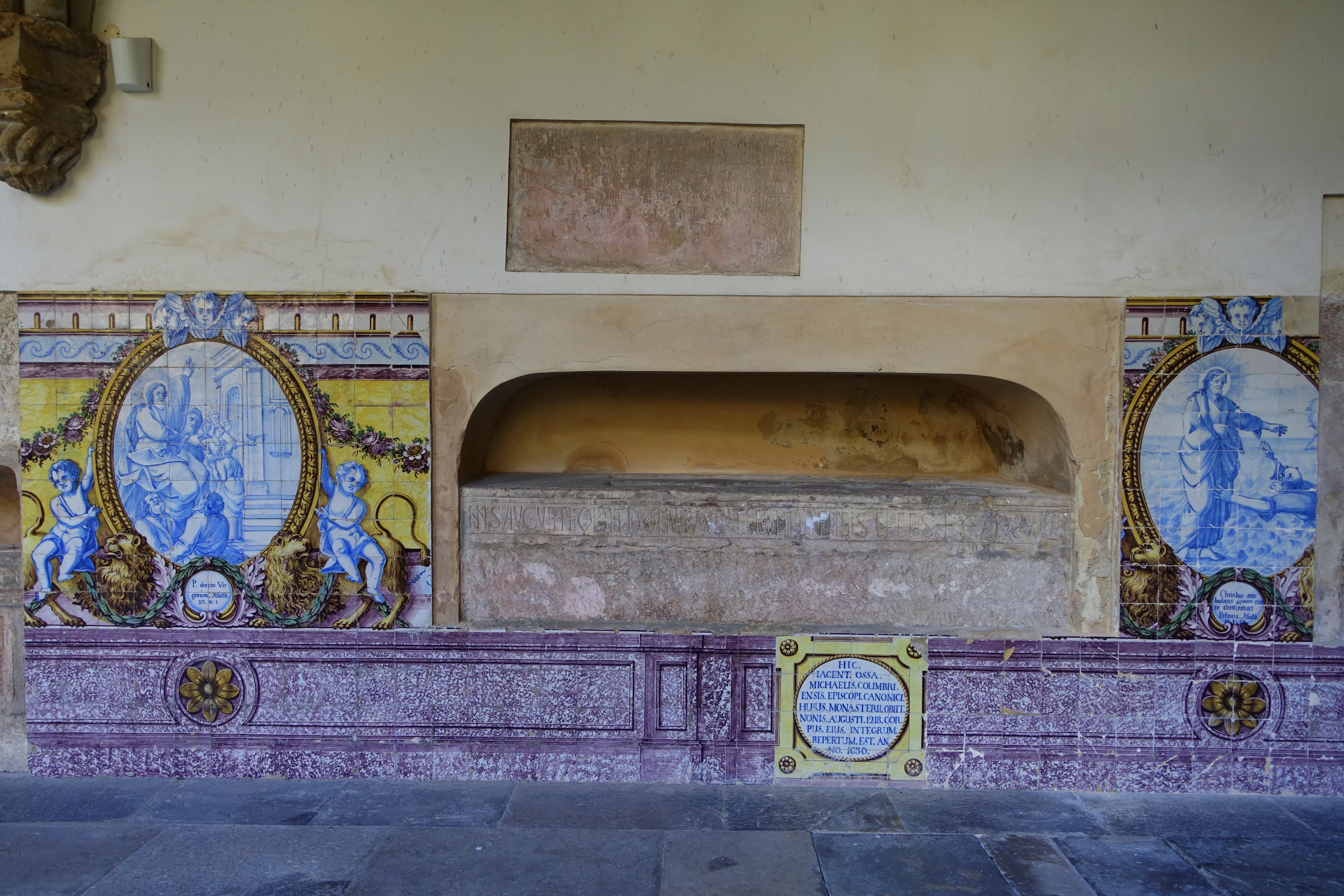
- Tomb of Bishop Miguel Pais Salomão in the cloisters of the Monastery of the Holy Cross
- Church: Roman Catholic Church
- Diocese: Diocese of Coimbra
- In office: 1158–1176
- Predecessor: João Anaia
- Successor: Bermudo
- Other post: Dean of Coimbra Cathedral

Personal details
- Born: 12th century AD
- Died: 5 August 1180 Coimbra, Portugal

Dom Miguel Pais Salomão, (Note: Also rendered as Miguel Paes Salomão, or simply Miguel Salomão.) O.S.C. (died 5 August 1180) was a medieval Portuguese prelate, Bishop of Coimbra from 1158 to 1176.

Throughout his episcopate, Miguel Pais Salomão significantly boosted the building works of the Old Cathedral of Coimbra, and granted important privileges to the community of Crosiers of the Monastery of the Holy Cross (to which he had previously belonged) — namely, that of exemption from the jurisdiction of the local ordinary, setting in motion a dispute between the monastery and some of the canons in his own cathedral chapter. He resigned from the bishopric in 1176, and retired to the Monastery of the Holy Cross where he died in 1180 and was buried according to his wishes.

On 18 February 1163, Miguel Pais Salomão hosted in his diocese a provincial council, presided by João Peculiar, Archbishop of Braga, to canonise Theotonius of Coimbra. Miguel Pais Salomão was also responsible for the canonisation of Goldrofe of Arganil in 1170, after he found himself cured of a grave malady after asking for his intercession.
