= Arganil (parish) =

- Civil parish
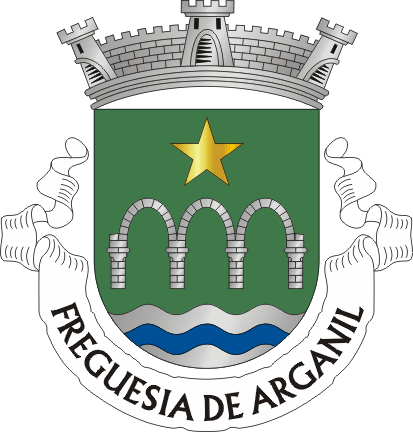
- Coat of arms

- Location in Portugal
- Coordinates: 40.218°N 8.054°W
- Country: Portugal
- Region: Centro
- Intermunic. comm.: Região de Coimbra
- District: Coimbra
- Municipality: Arganil

Area
  - Total: 34.11 km^{2} (13.17 sq mi)

Population (2021)
  - Total: 3,827
  - Density: 112.2/km^{2} (290.6/sq mi)
- Time zone: UTC+00:00 (WET)
  - Summer (DST): UTC+01:00 (WEST)
- Website: arganil.pt

Arganil is a town and a parish in Arganil Municipality, Portugal. The population in 2021 was 3,827, in an area of 34.11 km^{2} (13.17 sq mi).
