= Saxispiralis =

Scientific classification
- Kingdom: Fungi
- Division: Ascomycota
- Class: Dothideomycetes
- Order: Capnodiales
- Family: Aeminiaceae
- Genus: Saxispiralis; D.S. Paiva & A. Portugal
- Species: S. lemnorum

Binomial name
- Saxispiralis lemnorum D.S. Paiva & A. Portugal

Genus of fungi

Saxispiralis is a genus of fungi within the Aeminiaceae family. A single species is known: Saxispiralis lemnorum D.S. Paiva & A. Portugal, 2023.
