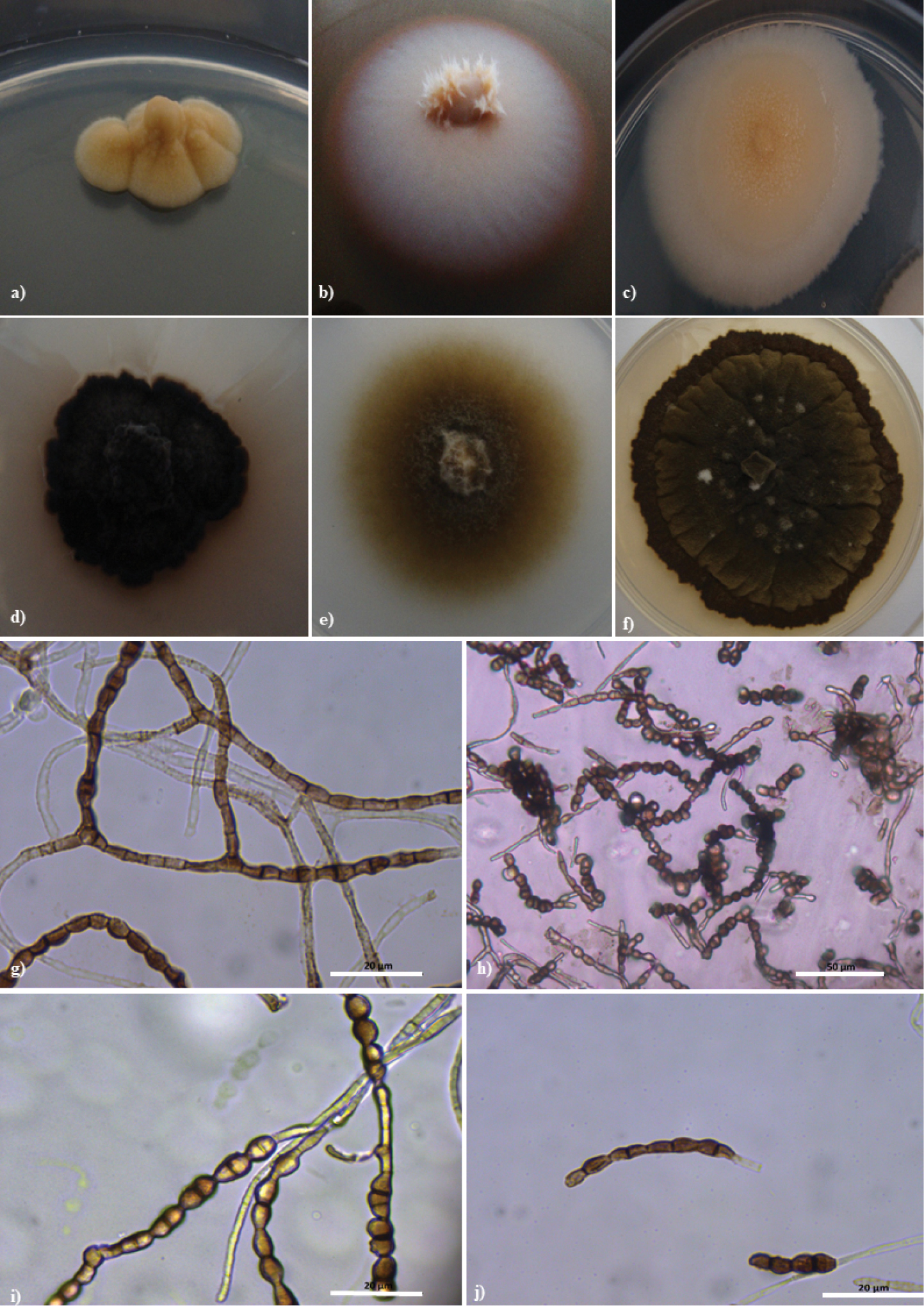
- Aeminium ludgeroi

Scientific classification
- Kingdom: Fungi
- Division: Ascomycota
- Class: Dothideomycetes
- Order: Capnodiales
- Family: Aeminiaceae; J.Trovão, I.Tiago & A.Portugal (2019)

Type genus
- Aeminium J.Trovão, I.Tiago & A.Portugal (2019)

Genera
- See text

= Aeminiaceae =

Family of fungi

The Aeminiaceae are a family of fungi in the Ascomycota, class Dothideomycetes. The family and the type genus are named after Aeminium, the Roman name of the city of Coimbra in Portugal, as the first species was first isolated from artwork in the Old Cathedral of Coimbra. A second genus, Saxispiralis, has since been discovered, also from a monument in Portugal.

== Genera ==
The following genera have been described:

- Aeminium J.Trovão, I.Tiago & A.Portugal (2019)
- Saxispiralis D.S.Paiva & A.Portugal (2023)
