= Vataça Lascaris =

Italian princess of Byzantine Greek origin

Lady Vataça Lascaris di Ventimiglia (1268 or c. 1272, in Ventimiglia or Aragon – 1336 or c. 1336, in Coimbra), also referred as Vatatsa Lascaris, Vataça of Ventimiglia, Dona Betaça, Betaça de Grécia, Vatatsa or Vetacia was an Italian princess of Byzantine Greek origin.

== Biography ==
Lady Vataça was the daughter of Princess Eudoxia Laskarina (1248–1311) of the Empire of Nicaea and Guillermo Pietro I, Count of Ventimiglia and Lord of Tende (~1230-1283). Eudoxia was the fourth daughter of Theodore II Laskaris and sister of young emperor John IV Laskaris, who was withdrawn from the throne by co-regent Michael VIII Palaiologos in 1261. After the conquest of Constantinople, Michael proclaimed himself sole ruler, blinding and displacing the young emperor and marrying the remaining princesses to foreigners. Eudoxia, still a child, married in 1261 in Constantinople with Count Pedro of the House of Ventimiglia and Tende (a region that retains the Byzantine double-headed eagle as a symbol), traveling then to Liguria.

At the same time Constance II of Hohenstaufen (Ann of Sicily) (1230–1307), widow empress of John III Doukas Vatatzes (c. 1193–1254), Eudoxia's grandfather, must have fled from the Byzantine court, returning to her native Sicily where her brother Manfred of Sicily ruled. In 1266, after the death of Manfred and conquest of Sicily by Charles of Anjou, Constance fled to Aragon where her niece Constance of Sicily (1249–1302) was consort of Peter III of Aragon and mother of Elizabeth of Aragon. Eudoxia also sought Aragon to escape Angevin dominance of Geno, by the time her husband died. Both Byzantine noble ladies were protected and respected at the court, probably given their importance in the medieval fights and diplomacy between Aragon, Sicily and the Byzantine Empire, thus explaining Vataça and Queen Elisabeth's proximity, friendship and interests.

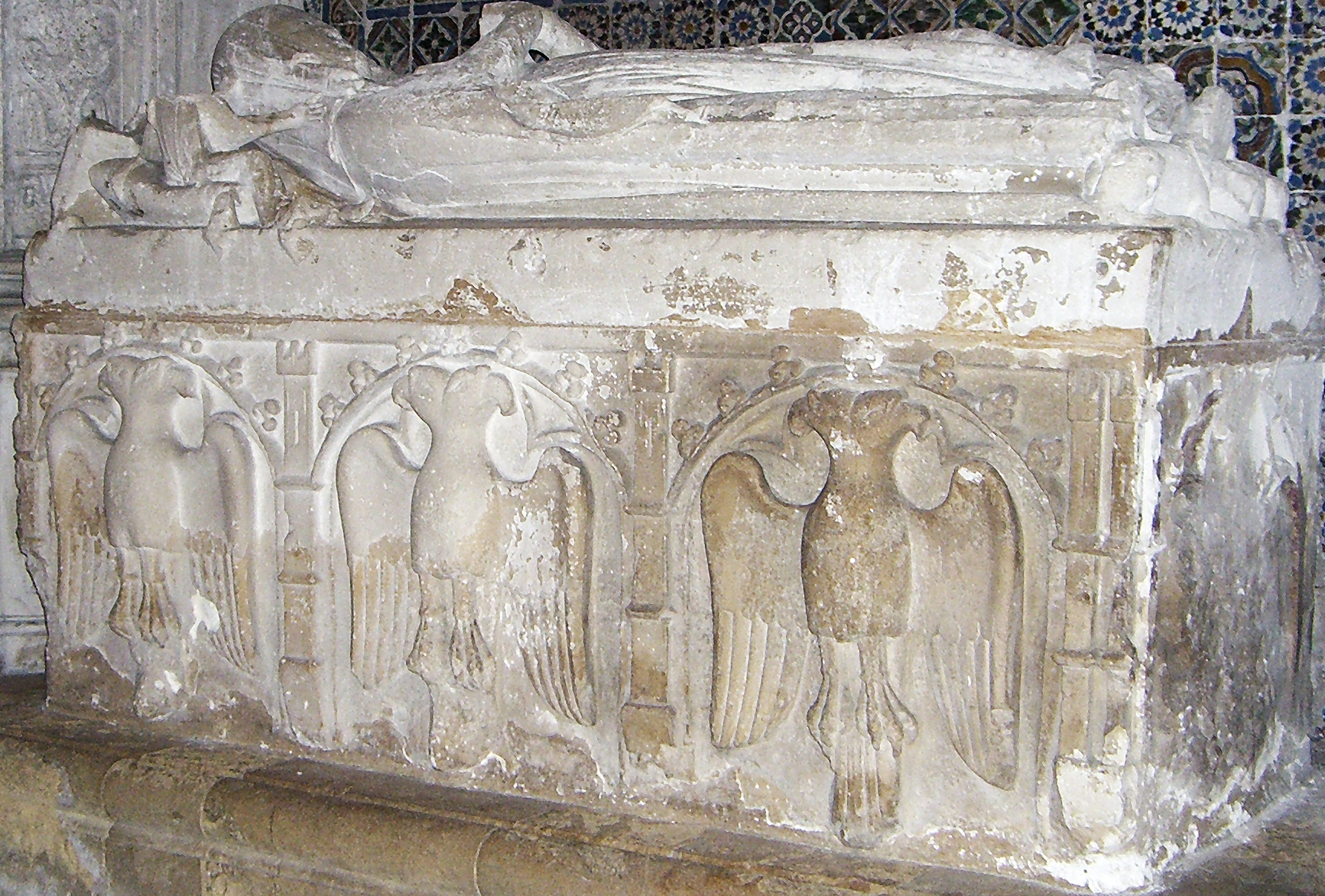
Tomb of Vatatza Lascaris, 1336, Old Cathedral of Coimbra, surrounded by Byzantine double-headed eagles.

In 1288, Lady Vataça accompanied Princess Elizabeth to Portugal for her wedding with King Denis of Portugal. As a court lady and friend of the future Saint Elizabeth of Portugal, to whom she was related as a descendant of Andrew II of Hungary, father of Saint Elizabeth of Hungary, she was charged with the education of her children. She remained in the service of Queen Elizabeth of Portugal and as a Maid of King Afonso IV of Portugal, and was created Lady of the Commands of Santiago do Cacém and of Sines, etc.

She married firstly in 1285 or 1288 Martim Anes de Soverosa, who died in 1295, without issue, and married secondly after 1295 Pedro Jordán de Urríes, Lord of Loarre, who died in 1350, and who distinguished himself at the service of the Aragonese Crown in Sicily and rendered effective help to Alfonso III of Aragon before the nobles of the Union, and had one son.

In 1302 she went with the first born Constance of Portugal to Castile, for her wedding with Ferdinand IV of Castile, to seal the peace between the two kingdoms. There she stayed until the death of Constance, who had left the infant Alfonso XI of Castile in her care while the queen herself went to Avila, where the court was to decide the tutorship of the infant king. Constance died on the journey and Vataça returned to Portugal.

In 1317, Lady Vataça established a small court in Santiago do Cacém castle, given to her by King Denis in 1310/15, where she dedicated herself to the administration of her large possessions until 1325 or 1332, when she followed Queen Elisabeth of Portugal to Coimbra. She died there in 1336 and her impressive tomb in the Old Cathedral of Coimbra, attributed to the sculptor Mestre Pero, is surrounded by double-headed eagles, symbol of the Laskaris dynasty and the Byzantine Empire.

Her son Pedro Jordán de Urríes y Lascaris di Ventimiglia, Lord of Loarre and of Alquézar, was a Bailiff, a General in 1356 and a Royal Councilman of Aragon. He bought King Peter IV of Aragon the village of Alquézar for fifty thousand escudos. He founded the Chapel of Saint Anton – today of Saints Cosmo and Damian – at the temple of Saint Dominick, of Huesca, and established there a Confrary. He married Toda Martínez de Riglos and had a son, Jordán Pérez de Urríes y Riglos, Lord of Loarre, Governor of Aragon, married to Teresa García de Riglos, and had issue, and a daughter, Vataça or Bataça Lascaris, born ca 1355, heiress and Lady of the Majorats of São Romão and Torredães, married to Gonçalo da Fonseca, Esquire, born ca 1345, and had issue.

== Sources ==
- "Tres princesas griegas en la corte de Jaime II de Aragon", Joaquin Miret y Sans, in _Revue hispanique_ 15 (1906)
- "A Byzantine Princess in Portugal" (Studies in Memory of David Talbot Rice) Author(s):Michael Maclagan (Maclagan, Michael) Edinburgh Publication 1975~
- "Vataça: uma dona na vida e na morte" Revista da Faculdade de Letras – História, 3ª série, III (1986), pp. 159–193
- "Os bens de Vataça. Visibilidade de uma existencia" Maria Helena da Cruz; VENTURA, Leontina -Separata da Revista de Historia das Ideias, vol. 9, Coimbra, FLUC, 1987
- "Infantas de Portugal, rainhas em Espanha" Cf. Marsilio CASSOTTI, (trad. Francisco Paiva Boléo), Lisboa, A Esfera dos Livros, 2007
- «D. Vataça: Um. Exilio, um Destino na Corte da Rainha Santa Isabel» Munda, 8,. 1984, pp. 49–54
- "Centro Studi Ventimigliani" (in Italian).
