= Pope Urban VIII =

Head of the Catholic Church from 1623 to 1644

- Bishop of Rome
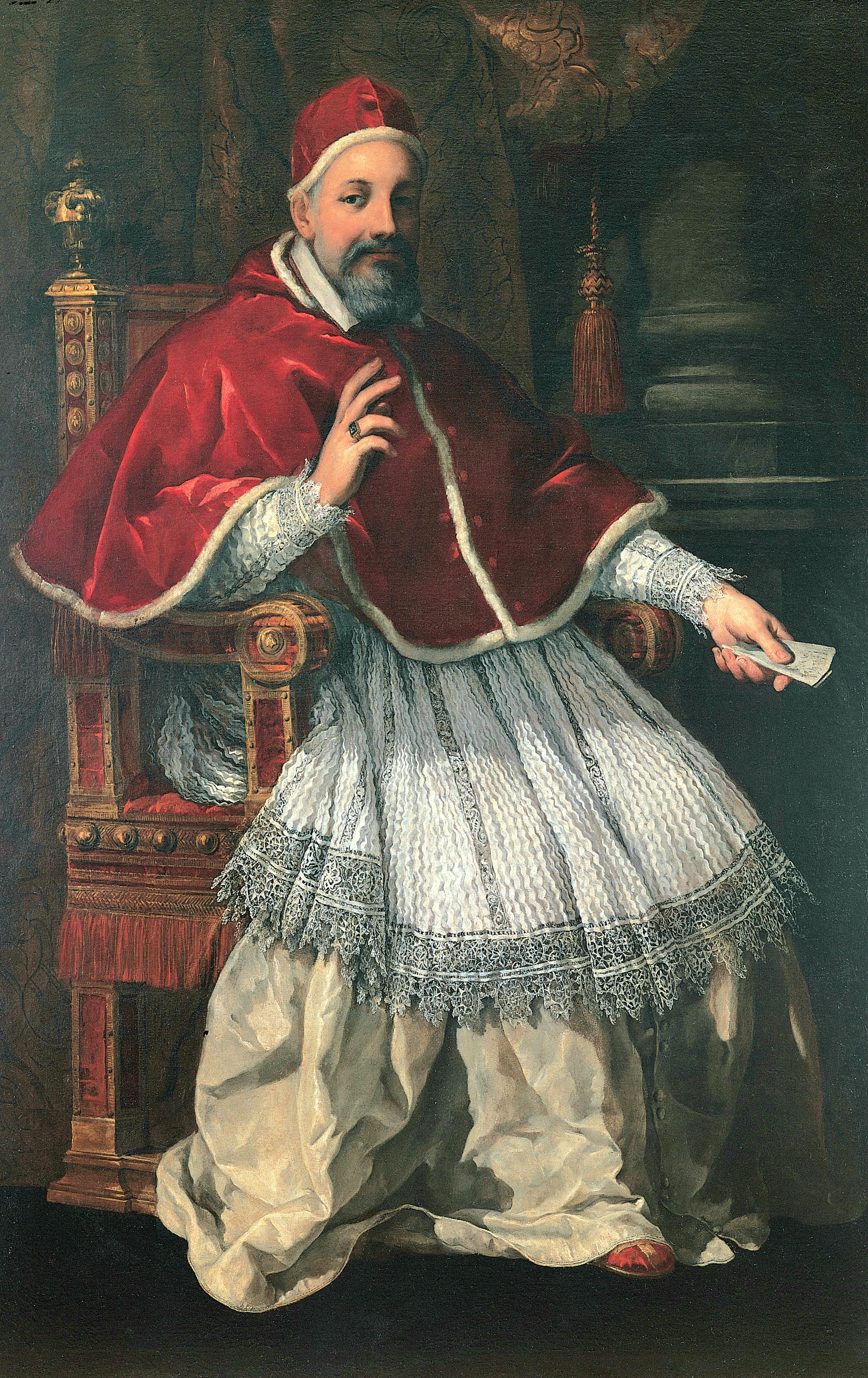
- Portrait by Pietro da Cortona, c. 1624–27 (oil on canvas, Capitoline Museums)
- Church: Catholic Church
- Papacy began: 6 August 1623
- Papacy ended: 29 July 1644
- Predecessor: Gregory XV
- Successor: Innocent X
- Previous posts: Referendary of the Apostolic Signatura (1589–1592); Governor of Fano (1592–1604); Titular Archbishop of Nazareth (1604–1608); Apostolic Nuncio to France (1604–1606); Cardinal-Priest of San Montorio (1607–1610); Bishop of Spoleto (1608–1617); Prefect of the Apostolic Signatura (1610–1623); Cardinal-Priest of Sant'Onofrio (1610–1623); Camerlengo of the Holy Roman Church (1623)

Orders
- Ordination: 24 September 1592
- Consecration: 28 October 1604 by Fabio Blondus de Montealto
- Created cardinal: 11 September 1606 by Paul V

Personal details
- Born: Maffeo Vincenzo Barberini; 5 April 1568 Barberino Val d'Elsa, Duchy of Florence
- Died: 29 July 1644 (aged 76) Rome, Papal States
- Parents: Antonio Barberini & Camilla Barbadoro
- Signature: Urban VIII's signature

- Coat of arms: Urban VIII's coat of arms

Pope Urban VIII (Latin: Urbanus VIII; Italian: Urbano VIII; baptised 5 April 1568 – 29 July 1644), born Maffeo Vincenzo Barberini, was head of the Catholic Church and ruler of the Papal States from 6 August 1623 to his death, in July 1644. As pope, he expanded the papal territory by force of arms and advantageous politicking, and was also a prominent patron of the arts, commissioning works from artists like Gian Lorenzo Bernini, and a reformer of Church missions. His papacy also covered 21 years of the Thirty Years' War.

The massive debts incurred during his pontificate greatly weakened his successors, who were unable to maintain the papacy's longstanding political and military influence in Europe. He was also an opponent of Copernicanism and was involved in the Galileo affair, which saw the astronomer tried for heresy. He is the last pope to date to take the papal name Urban.

== Biography ==
=== Early life ===
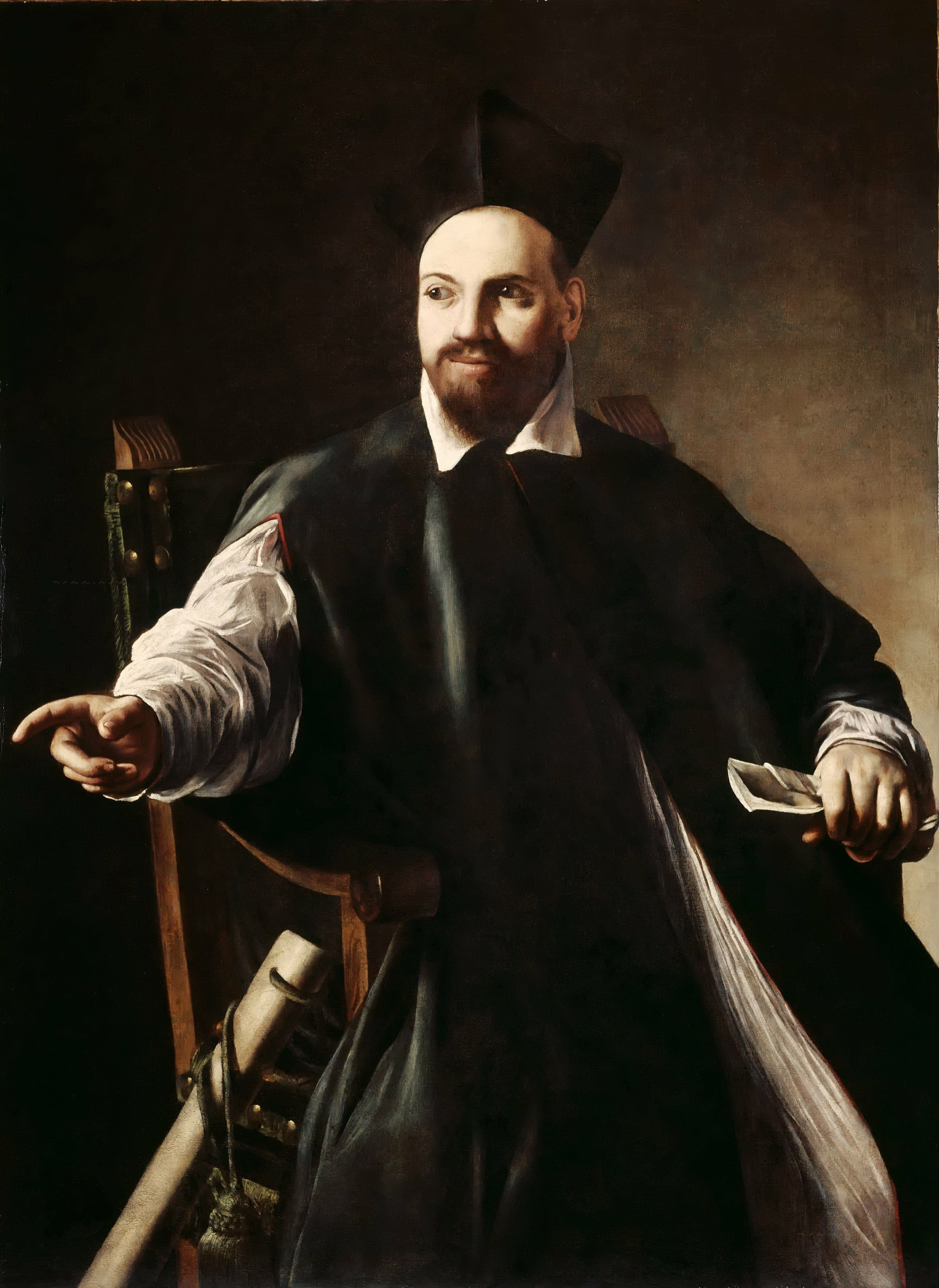
c. 1598 painting of Maffeo Barberini at age 30 by Caravaggio.

Maffeo Vincenzo Barberini was born in April 1568, the son of Antonio Barberini, a Florentine nobleman, and Camilla Barbadoro. He was born at Barberino Val d'Elsa in "Tafania" house. His father died when he was only three years old and his mother took him to Rome, where he was put in the charge of his uncle, Francesco Barberini, an apostolic protonotary. At the age of 16, he became his uncle's heir. He was educated by the Society of Jesus ("Jesuits"), and received a doctorate of law from the University of Pisa in 1589.

In 1601, Barberini, through the influence of his uncle, was able to secure from Pope Clement VIII appointment as a papal legate to the court of King Henry IV of France. In 1604, the same pope appointed him as the Archbishop of Nazareth, an office joined with that of Bishop of the suppressed Dioceses of Canne and Monteverde, with his residence at Barletta. At the death of his uncle, he inherited his riches, with which he bought a palace in Rome, which he made into a luxurious Renaissance residence.

Pope Paul V also later employed Barberini in a similar capacity, afterwards raising him, in 1606, to the order of the Cardinal-Priest, with the titular church of San Pietro in Montorio and appointing him as a papal legate of Bologna.

== Papacy ==
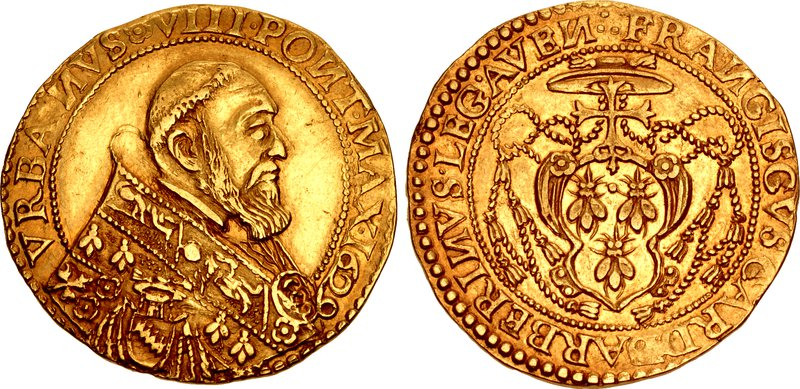
Gold quadrupla coin of Pope Urban VIII, struck at the Avignon mint, dated 1629

Papal styles of Pope Urban VIII
- Reference style: His Holiness
- Spoken style: Your Holiness
- Religious style: Holy Father
- Posthumous style: None

=== Papal election ===
Barberini was considered someone who could be elected as pope, though there were those such as Cardinal Ottavio Bandini who worked to prevent it. Throughout 29–30 July, the cardinals began an intense series of negotiations to test the numbers as to who could emerge from the conclave as pope, with Cardinal Ludovico Ludovisi dismissing Barberini's chances as long as Barberini remained a close ally of Cardinal Scipione Borghese, whose faction Barberini supported. Ludovisi had discussions with Cardinals Odoardo Farnese, Carlo de' Medici and Ippolito Aldobrandini on 30 July about seeing to Barberini's election. The three supported his candidacy and went about securing the support of others, which led to Barberini's election just over a week later. On 6 August 1623, at the papal conclave following the death of Pope Gregory XV, Barberini was chosen as Gregory XV's successor and took the name Urban VIII. His coronation had to be postponed until 29 September 1623 since the new pontiff was ill at the time of his election.

Upon Pope Urban VIII's election, Zeno, the Venetian envoy, wrote the following description of him:

The new Pontiff is 56 years old. His Holiness is tall, dark, with regular features and black hair turning grey. He is exceptionally elegant and refined in all details of his dress; has a graceful and aristocratic bearing and exquisite taste. He is an excellent speaker and debater, writes verses and patronises poets and men of letters.

=== Activities ===
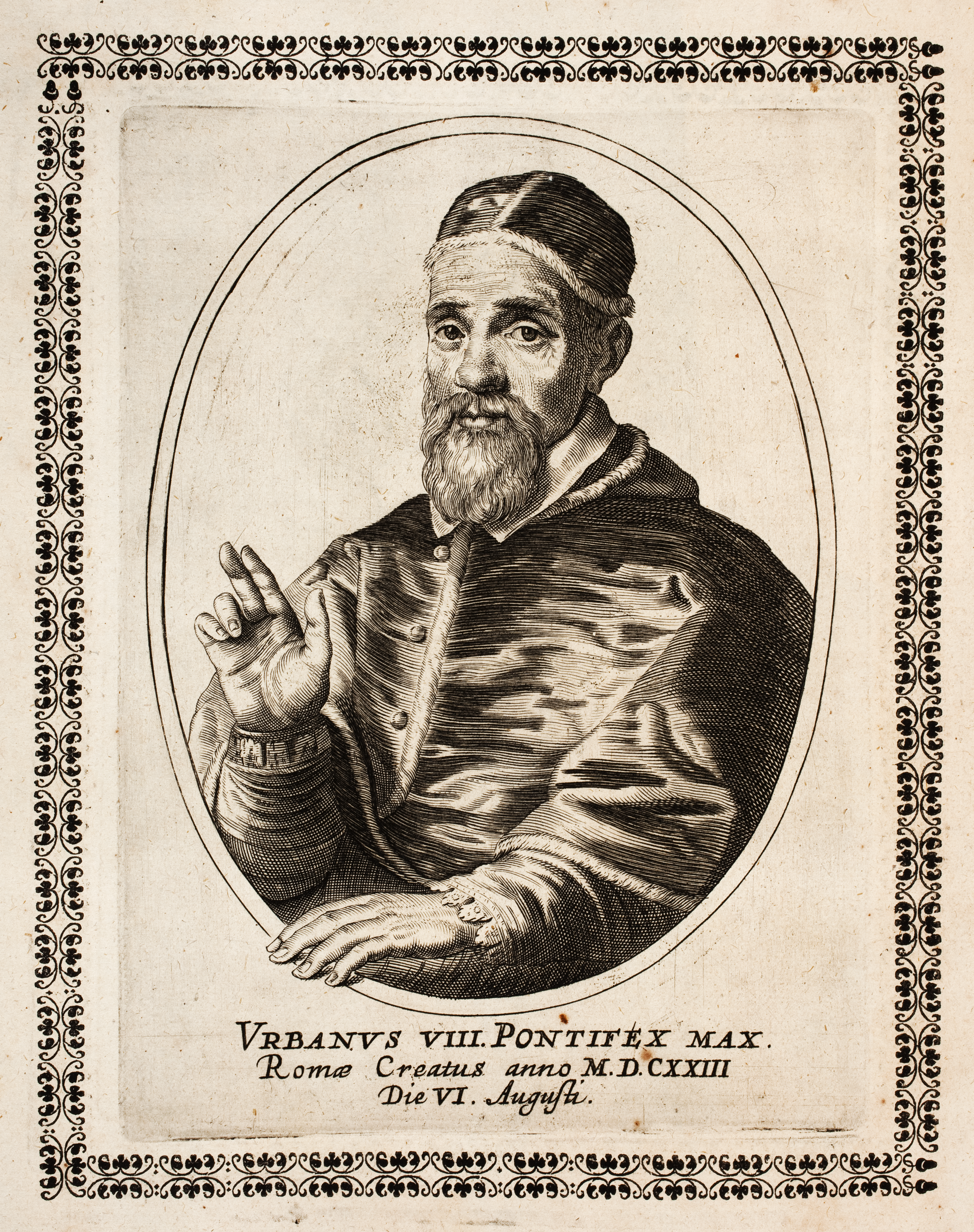
Engraving of Pope Urban VIII

Urban VIII's papacy covered 21 years of the Thirty Years' War (1618–1648), and was an eventful one, even by the standards of the day.

Despite an early friendship and encouragement for his teachings, Urban VIII was responsible for summoning the scientist and astronomer Galileo to Rome in 1633 to recant his work. Urban VIII was opposed to Copernican heliocentrism and he ordered Galileo's trial after the publication of Dialogue Concerning the Two Chief World Systems, in which Urban's point of view is argued by the character "Simplicio".

Urban VIII practiced nepotism on a grand scale; various members of his family were enormously enriched by him, so that it seemed to contemporaries as if he were establishing a Barberini dynasty. He elevated his brother Antonio Marcello Barberini (Antonio the Elder) and then his nephews Francesco Barberini and Antonio Barberini (Antonio the Younger) to Cardinal. He also bestowed upon their brother, Taddeo Barberini, the titles Prince of Palestrina, Gonfalonier of the Church, Prefect of Rome and Commander of Sant'Angelo. Historian Leopold von Ranke estimated that during his reign, Urban VIII's immediate family amassed 105 million scudi in personal wealth.

Urban VIII was a skilled writer of Latin verse, and a collection of scriptural paraphrases as well as original hymns of his composition have been frequently reprinted.

The 1638 papal bull Commissum Nobis protected the existence of Jesuit missions in South America by forbidding the enslavement of natives who were at the Jesuit Reductions. At the same time, Urban VIII repealed the Jesuit monopoly on missionary work in China and Japan, opening these countries to missionaries of other orders and missionary societies.

In response to complaints in the Diocese of Seville, Urban VIII issued the letter Cum Ecclesiae, dated 30 January 1642, that made use of tobacco in holy places punishable by excommunication. While often described as a papal bull, the document was not filed as such and was more than likely an encyclical; Pope Benedict XIII eventually abrogated the tobacco ban, preferring other methods to ensuring the cleanliness of church facilities.

==== Canonizations and beatifications ====
Urban VIII canonized five saints during his pontificate: Stephen Harding (1623), Elizabeth of Portugal and Conrad of Piacenza (1625), Peter Nolasco (1628), and Andrea Corsini (1629). The pope also beatified 68 individuals, including the Martyrs of Nagasaki (1627). He also issued the papal bulls of canonization for Ignatius of Loyola (founder of the Society of Jesus, "Jesuits") and Francis Xavier (also a Jesuit), who had been canonized by his predecessor, Pope Gregory XV.

==== Canonical coronation ====
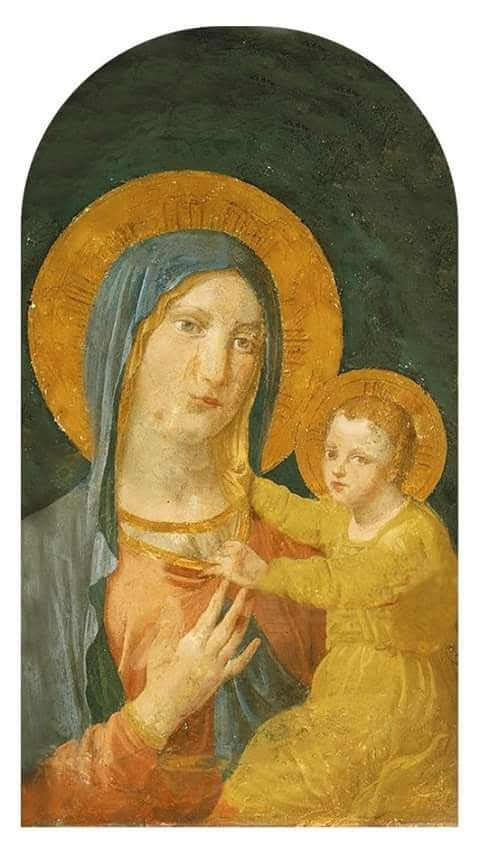
The icon of the La Madonna della Febbre which was crowned in 1631 making it as the first Marian image to receive a pontifical coronation.

Pope Urban VIII is also known as the first pope who granted a canonical coronation towards a Marian icon. The first icon that was crowned was the La Madonna della Febbre which is enshrined at the sacristy of St. Peter's Basilica. The coronation took place on 1631 making it as the first coronation in the world.

==== Consistories ====
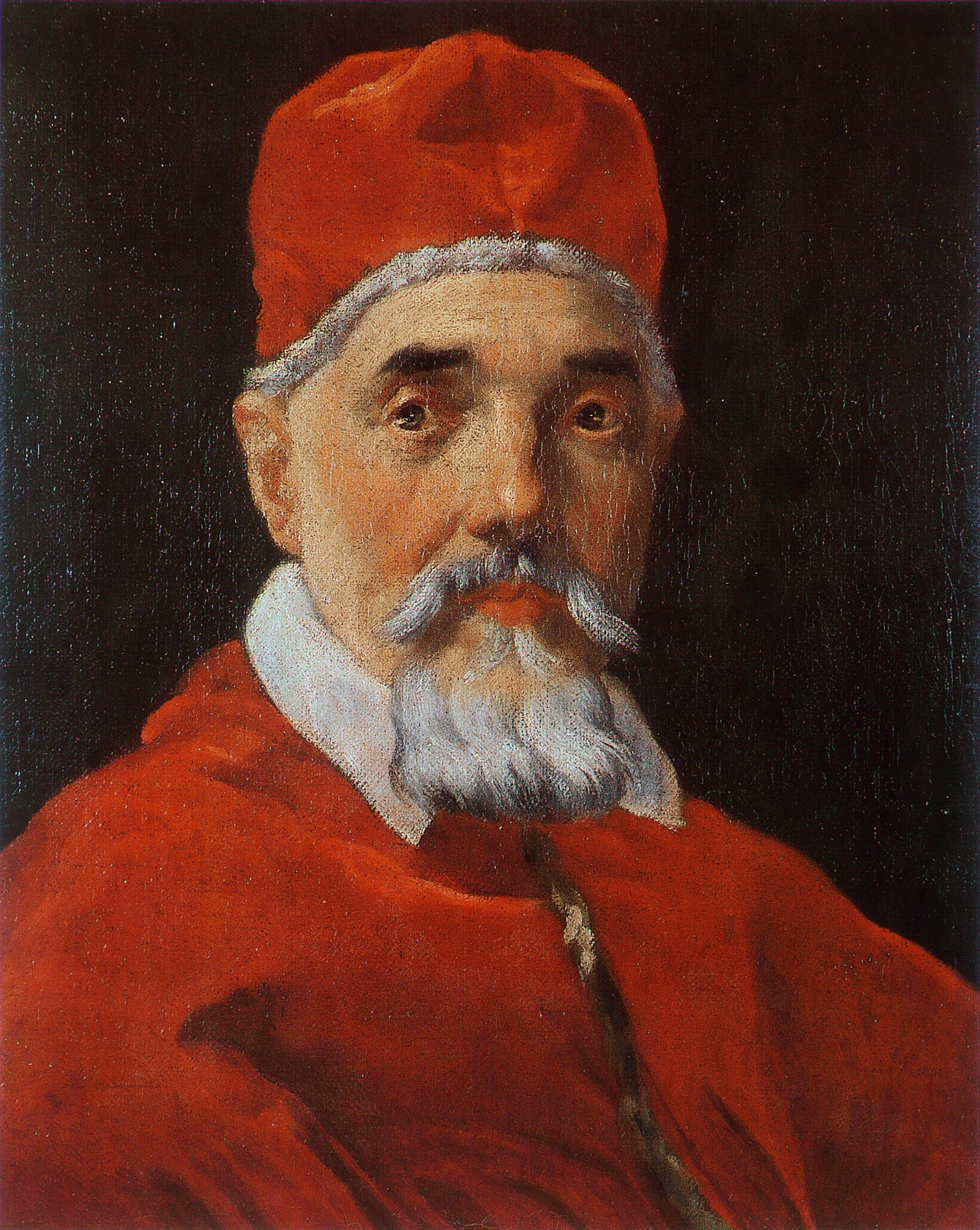
Portrait of Urban VIII by Gian Lorenzo Bernini, c. 1631–32

The pope created 74 cardinals in eight consistories throughout his pontificate, and this included his nephews Francesco and Antonio, cousin Lorenzo Magalotti, and the pope's own brother Antonio Marcello. He also created Giovanni Battista Pamphili as a cardinal, with Pamphili becoming his immediate successor, Pope Innocent X. The pope also created eight of those cardinals whom he had reserved in pectore.

==== Policy on private revelation ====
In the papal bull Sanctissimus Dominus Noster of 13 March 1625, Urban instructed Catholics not to venerate the deceased or represent them in the manner of saints without Church sanction. It required a bishop's approval for the publication of private revelations. Since the nineteenth century, it has become common for books of popular devotion to carry a disclaimer. One read in part: "In obedience to the decrees of Urban the Eighth, I declare that I have no intention of attributing any other than a purely human authority to the miracles, revelations, favours, and particular cases recorded in this book..."

=== Politics ===
Urban VIII's military involvement was aimed less at the restoration of Catholicism in Europe than at adjusting the balance of power to favour his own independence in Italy. In 1626, the Duchy of Urbino was incorporated into the Papal dominions, and, in 1627, when the direct male line of the Gonzagas in Mantua became extinct, he controversially favoured the succession of the Duke Charles of Nevers against the claims of the Habsburgs. He also launched the Wars of Castro in 1641 against Odoardo Farnese, Duke of Parma and Piacenza, whom he excommunicated. Castro was destroyed and its duchy incorporated into the Papal States.

Urban VIII was the last pope to extend the Papal territory. He fortified Castelfranco Emilia on the Mantuan frontier and commissioned Vincenzo Maculani to fortify the Castel Sant'Angelo in Rome. Urban VIII also established an arsenal in the Vatican, an arms factory at Tivoli and fortified the harbour of Civitavecchia.

For the purposes of making cannon and the baldacchino in St Peter's, massive bronze girders were pillaged from the portico of the Pantheon leading to the well known lampoon: quod non fecerunt barbari, fecerunt Barberini, "what the barbarians did not do, the Barberini did."

=== Patron of the arts ===
Urban VIII expended vast sums bringing polymaths like Athanasius Kircher to Rome and funding various substantial works by the sculptor and architect Bernini, from whom he had already commissioned Boy with a Dragon around 1617 and who was particularly favored during Urban VIII's reign. As well as several portrait busts of Urban, Urban commissioned Bernini to work on the family palace in Rome, the Palazzo Barberini, the college of the Propaganda Fide, the Fontana del Tritone in the Piazza Barberini, the baldacchino and cathedra in St Peter's Basilica and other prominent structures in the city. Numerous members of Barberini's family also had their likeness caught in stone by Bernini, such as his brothers Carlo and Antonio. Urban also had rebuilt the Church of Santa Bibiana and the Church of San Sebastiano al Palatino on the Palatine Hill.

The Barberini patronised painters such as Nicolas Poussin and Claude Lorrain. One of the most eulogistic of these artistic works in its celebration of his reign, is the huge Allegory of Divine Providence and Barberini Power painted by Pietro da Cortona on the ceiling of the large salon of the Palazzo Barberini.

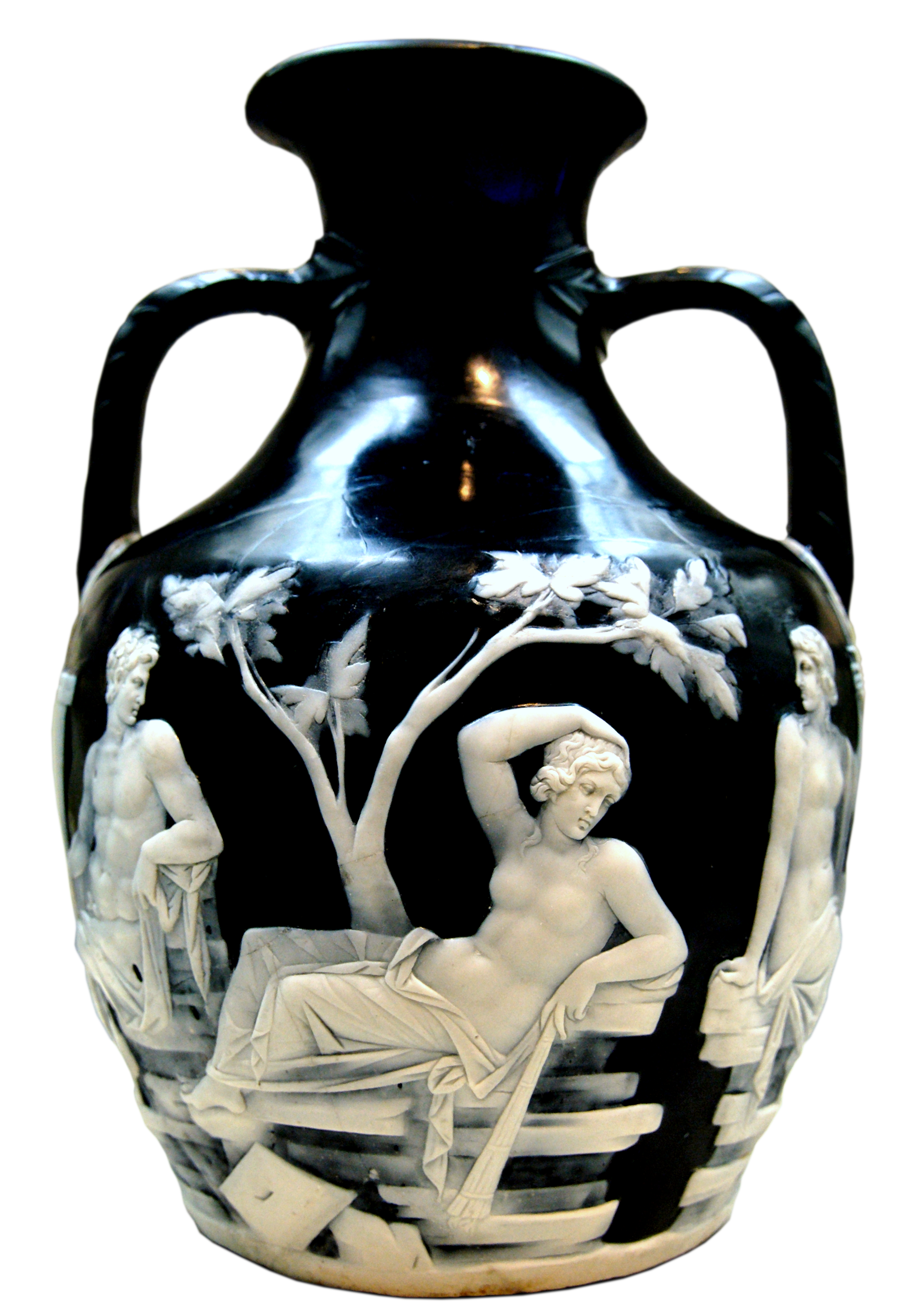
The Barberini Vase, now renamed the Portland Vase

Another such acquisition, in a vast collection, was the 'Barberini vase'. This was allegedly found at the mausoleum of the Roman Emperor Severus Alexander and his family at Monte Del Grano. Its discovery is described by Pietro Santi Bartoli, who says that it contained Severus Alexander's ashes; this assertion, together with the interpretation of the scenes depicted in the vase's reliefs, have been the subjects of considerable dispute. The vase remained with the Barberini family for some 150 years before passing through the hands of Sir William Hamilton, Ambassador to the Royal Court in Naples. It was later sold to the Duke of Portland, and has subsequently been known as the Portland Vase.

=== Later life ===
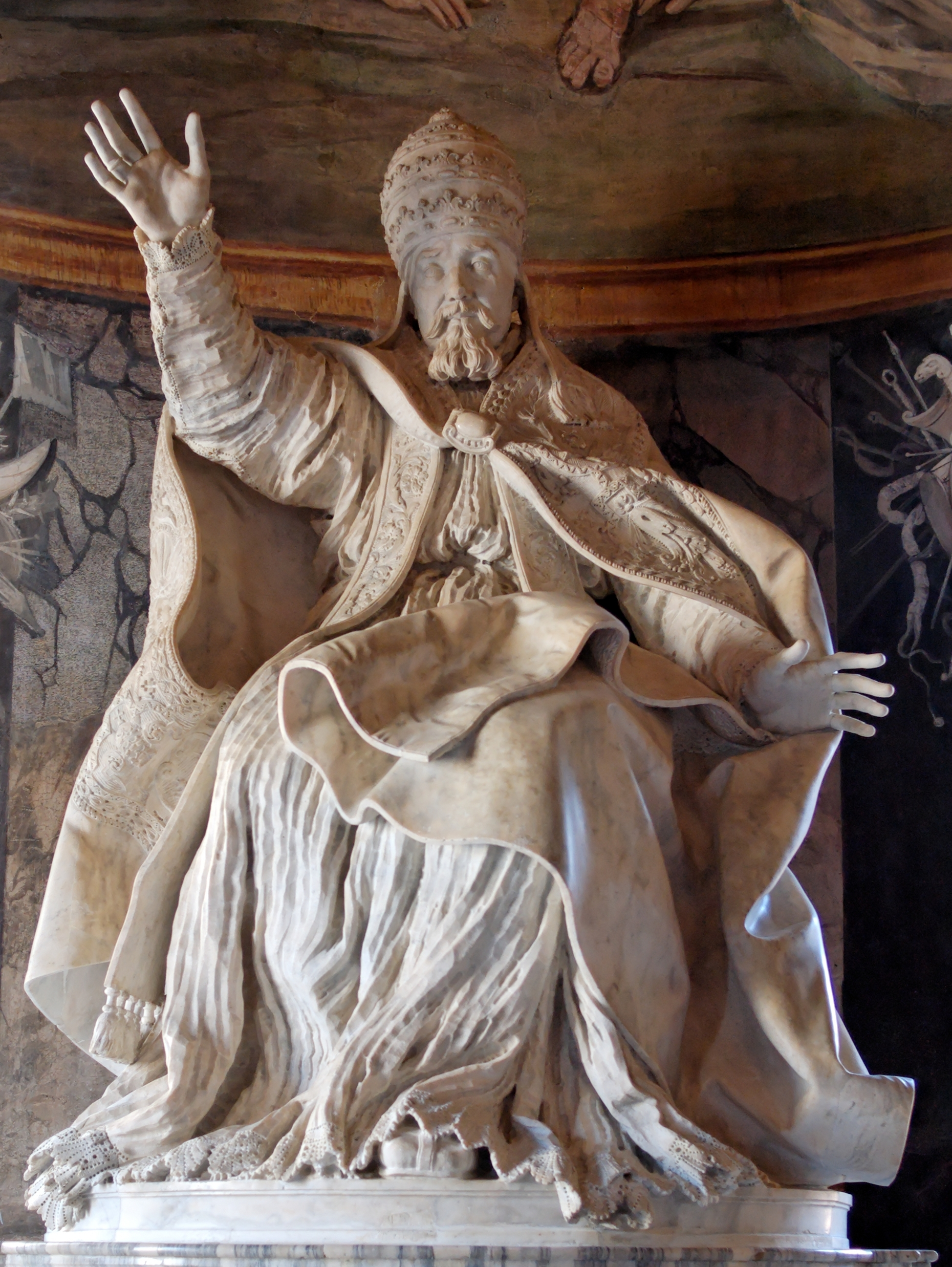
Statue of Pope Urban VIII sculpted by Bernini and his students between 1635 and 1640, and on display at the Palazzo dei Conservatori in Rome

A consequence of these military and artistic endeavours was a massive increase in papal debt. Urban VIII inherited a debt of 16 million scudi, and by 1635 had increased it to 28 million.

According to contemporary John Bargrave, in 1636 members of the Spanish faction of the College of Cardinals were so horrified by the conduct of Pope Urban VIII that they conspired to have him arrested and imprisoned (or killed) so that they could replace him with a new pope; namely Laudivio Zacchia. When Urban VIII travelled to Castel Gandolfo to rest, the members of the Spanish faction met in secret and discussed ways to advance their plan. But they were discovered and the pope raced back to Rome where he immediately held a consistory and demanded to know who the new pope was. To put an end to the conspiracy, the pope decreed that all Cardinal-Bishops should leave Rome and return to their own churches.

With the Spanish plan having failed, by 1640 the debt had reached 35 million scudi, consuming more than 80% of annual papal income in interest repayments.

=== Death and legacy ===
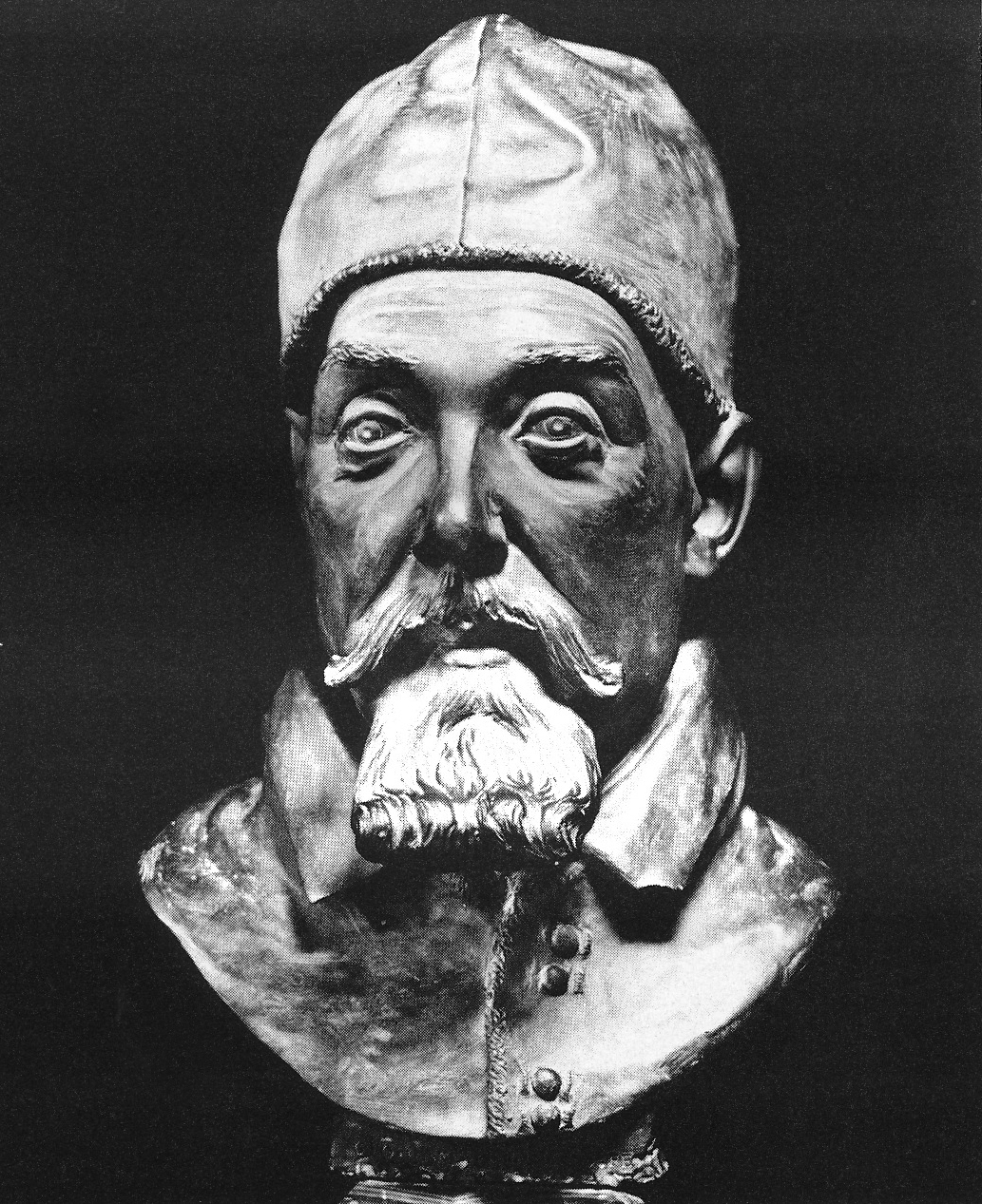
Bust by Giovanni Gonnelli

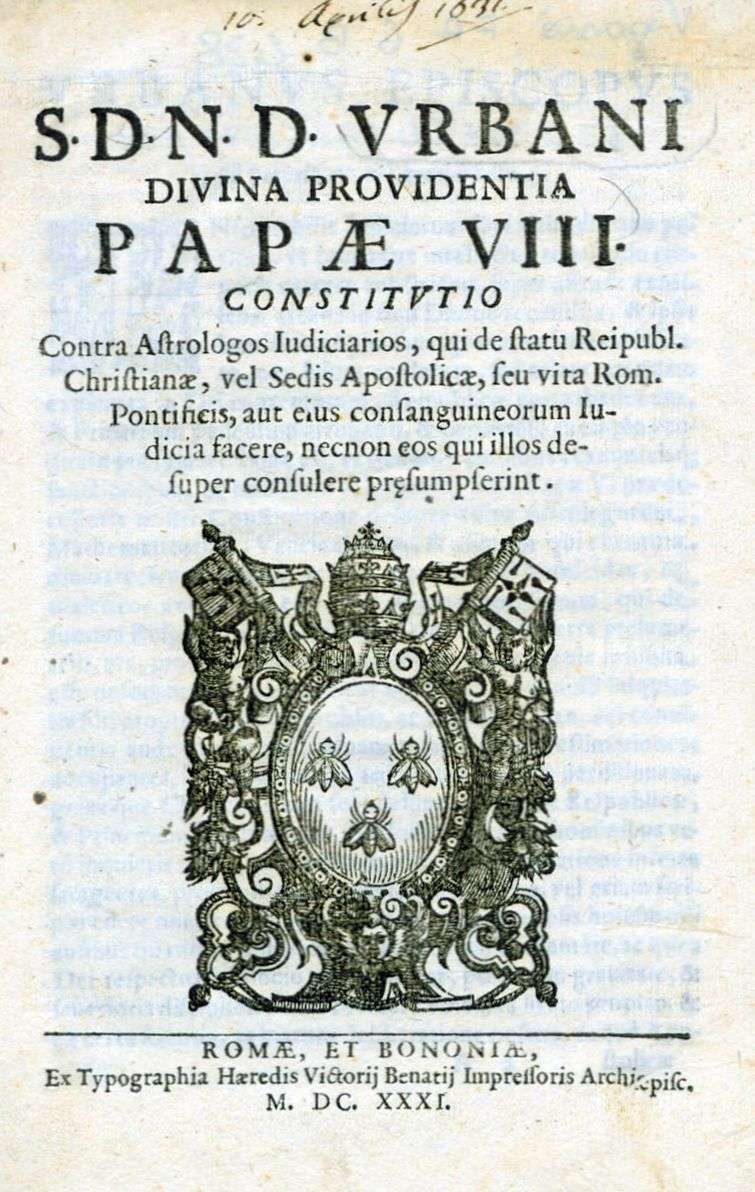
Constitutio contra astrologos iudiciarios, 1631

Urban VIII's death, on 29 July 1644, is said to have been hastened by chagrin at the result of the Wars of Castro. Because of the costs incurred by the city of Rome to finance this war, Urban VIII became immensely unpopular with his subjects.

On his death, the bust of Urban VIII that lay beside the Palace of the Conservators on the Capitoline Hill was rapidly destroyed by an enraged crowd, and only a quick-thinking priest saved the sculpture of the late pope belonging to the Jesuits from a similar fate.

Following his death, international and domestic machinations resulted in the papal conclave not electing Cardinal Giulio Cesare Sacchetti, who was closely associated with some members of the Barberini family. Instead, it elected Cardinal Giovanni Battista Pamphili, who took the name of Innocent X, as his successor at the papal conclave of 1644.

== Portrayals in fiction ==
Urban VIII is a recurring character in the Ring of Fire alternative history hypernovel by Eric Flint et al. where he is favorably portrayed. He is especially prominent in 1634: The Galileo Affair (in which he makes the fictional Grantville priest, Larry Mazzare, a cardinal), and in 1635: The Cannon Law, 1635: The Papal Stakes, and 1636: The Vatican Sanction. He is somewhat less favorably presented in Galileo's Dream by Kim Stanley Robinson. He is a sinister character in the radio play In Praise of Evil by David Pownall, first broadcast on BBC Radio in 2013. The play features an imaginary meeting between the Pope and the composer Monteverdi.

== See also ==
- Barberini
- Wars of Castro
- Portrait of Maffeo Barberini
- Cardinals created by Urban VIII
- Pontificio Collegio Urbano de Propaganda Fide
- Palazzo Barberini ai Giubbonari

== Sources ==
- Barton, Eleanor Dodge (1964). "Further Notes on the Barberini Tapestries". Bulletin of the Museum of Fine Arts. 62 (329). Museum of Fine Arts, Boston: 114–118.
- Buescher, John B. (9 November 2017). "In the Habit: A History of Catholicism and Tobacco". The Catholic World Report. Archived from the original on 12 November 2017.
- Collins, Roger (2009). Keepers of the Keys of Heaven: A History of the Papacy. Basic Books.
- Keyvanian, Carla (2005). "Concerted Efforts: The Quarter of the Barberini Casa Grande in Seventeenth-Century Rome". Journal of the Society of Architectural Historians. 64 (3): 292–311. doi:10.2307/25068166. JSTOR 25068166.
- Mooney, James (1910). "Catholic Encyclopedia Volume VII". Robert Appleton Company, New York.
- Nussdorfer, Laurie (1992). Civic Politics in the Rome of Urban VIII. Princeton University Press. ISBN 978-0-691-60212-7.
- Ott, Michael T. (1912). "Pope Urban VIII". The Catholic Encyclopedia. Vol. XV. New York: Robert Appleton Company.
- "The Popes and Tobacco". American Ecclesiastical Review. 42 (5): 612–613. May 1910.

== Works ==
- Constitutio contra astrologos iudiciarios (in Italian). Roma: eredi Vittorio Benacci. 1631.

Catholic Church titles
| Preceded by Gregory XV | Pope; 6 August 1623 – 29 July 1644 | Succeeded by Innocent X |
