= Dominican Convent, Zaragoza =

Priory in Zaragoza, Spain

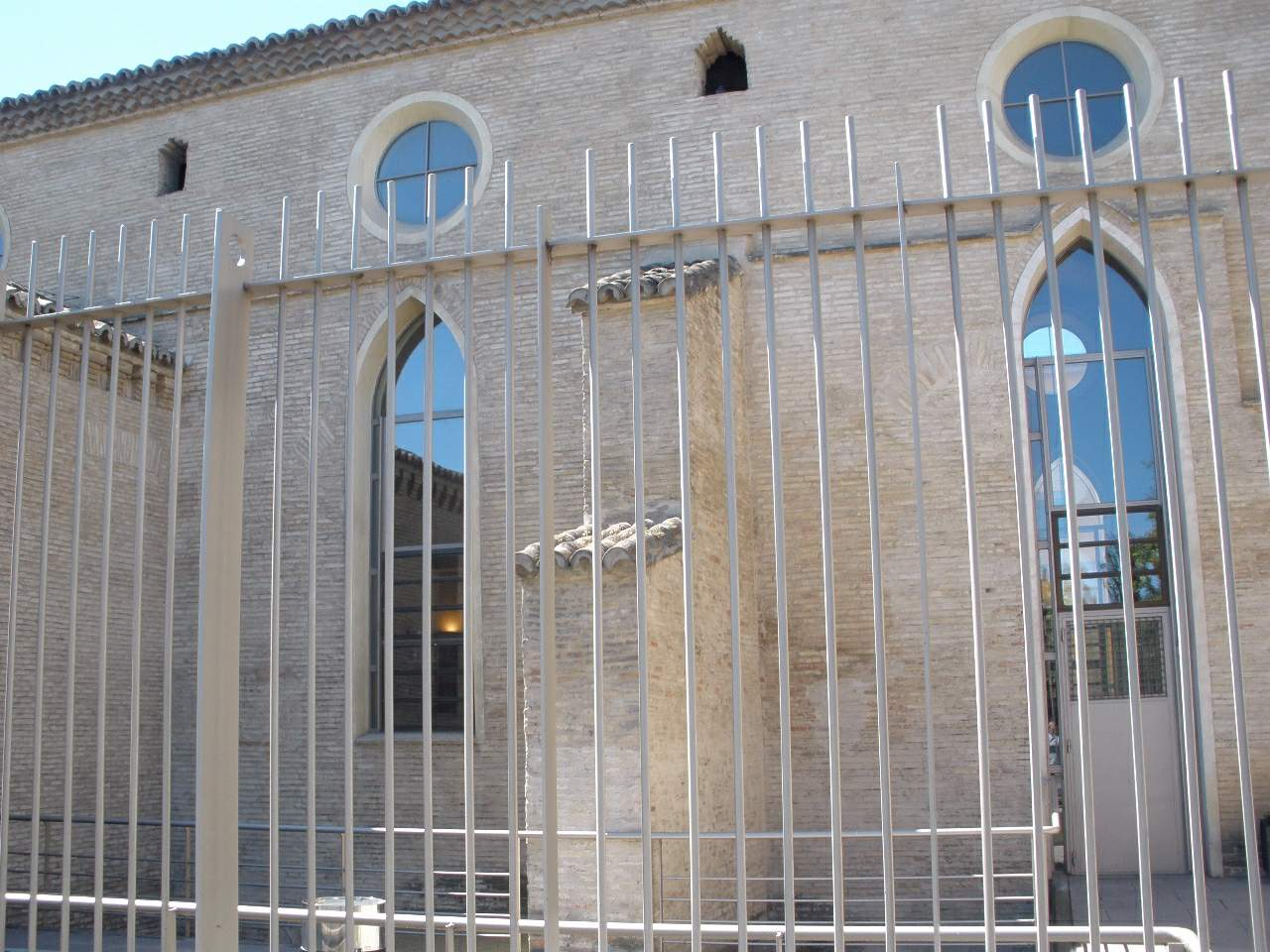

The Dominican Convent in the city of Zaragoza, Aragon, Spain (Spanish: Convento de Santo Domingo de Zaragoza) is a former Dominican priory.

The remains of Eudoxia Laskarina Asanina, also known as Irene Lascaris are said to lie here.

== See also ==
- Ventimiglia family
