= Bust of Antonio Barberini (Bernini) =

Sculpture by Gian Lorenzo Bernini

Coordinates: 41°54′12.65″N 12°29′24.75″E

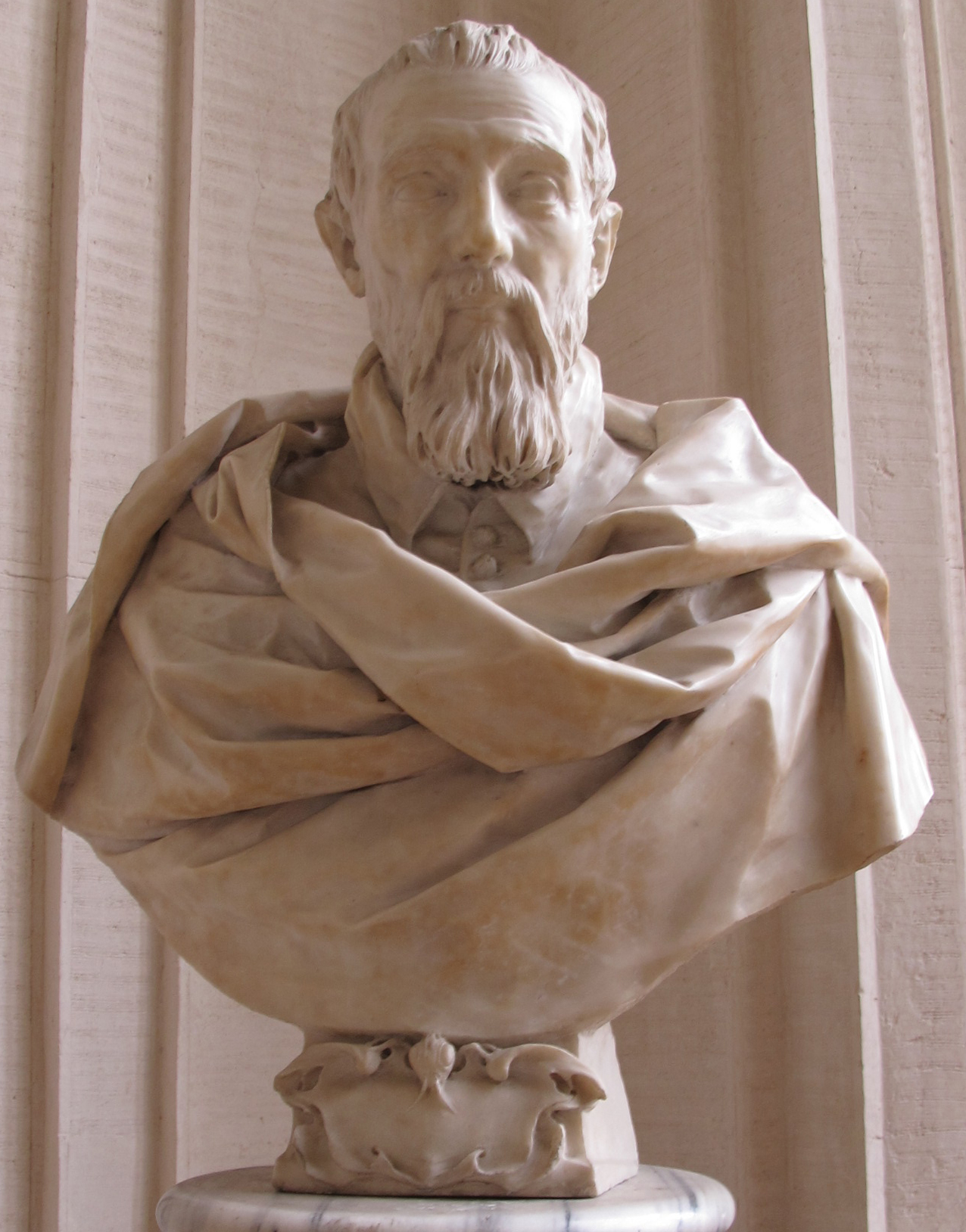
- Artist: Gian Lorenzo Bernini
- Year: 1620s
- Type: Sculpture
- Medium: Marble
- Subject: Antonio Marcello Barberini
- Location: Galleria Nazionale d'Arte Antica; Rome

The Bust of Antonio Barberini is a portrait sculpture by the Italian artist Gian Lorenzo Bernini. The figure is Cardinal Antonio Barberini, the younger brother of Pope Urban VIII. It was executed sometime in the 1620s.

== Rome ==
The bust is now in the Galleria Nazionale de Arte Antica, in Rome, Italy
