= New Cathedral of Coimbra =

Building or structure in Coimbra, Portugal

- Sé Nova de Coimbra
- Façade of the New Cathedral of Coimbra

Religion
- Affiliation: Roman Catholic
- Diocese: Coimbra
- Province: Beira Litoral Province
- Ecclesiastical or organisational status: Co-Cathedral

Location
- Location: Coimbra, Portugal
- Interactive map of New Cathedral of Coimbra
- Coordinates: 40.2097°N 8.4246°W

Architecture
- Type: Church
- Style: Baroque
- Groundbreaking: 1541
- Completed: 17th century

The New Cathedral of Coimbra, also referred to as Cathedral of the Holy Name of Jesus, is currently bishopric co-seat, along with the Old Cathedral of Coimbra, of the city of Coimbra, in Portugal. The cathedral is located near the historical University of Coimbra in the upper part of the town (Alta de Coimbra).

== History ==
The "New Cathedral" was originally the church of the Jesuit's university college in Coimbra, established in the city in 1543. In 1759, the Jesuit Order was banned from Portugal by the Marquis of Pombal, Prime Minister of King José I.

In 1772, the bishopric seat was transferred from the old Romanesque Cathedral of the city (now called the Old Cathedral of Coimbra) to the vacant, spacious and more modern Jesuit church.

The church architecture was influential in the Portuguese colonial world. The façade of the former Jesuit church of Salvador, in colonial Brazil (now the Cathedral of Salvador), built in the 17th century, seems inspired by the Jesuit church of Coimbra.

== Description ==
The niches of the façade of the New Cathedral carry statues of four Jesuit saints. The Baroque decoration of the upper part of the façade, finished in the beginning of the 18th century, contrasts with the lower part, which follows a rigid Mannerist style. The church has two bell towers located just behind the main façade and a dome over the crossing.

The interior, covered with barrel vaulting, has one nave with several lateral chapels and a transept with a dome and cupola. Both transept arms and the main chapel of the apse are decorated with large gilt wood altarpieces built between the 17th and 18th centuries in the "national" Portuguese altarpiece style. The lateral chapels of the nave have altarpieces in Mannerist and Baroque styles.

The 17th-century choir stalls of the main chapel were brought from the Old Cathedral, as was the intricate stone baptismal font, carved by Pero and Felipe Henriques in late Gothic-Manueline style in the beginning of the 16th century.

== Image gallery ==
Nave looking toward the high altar

High altar and gilded altarpiece flanked by pipe organs

Transept altarpiece with reliquary cabinets

Transept altarpiece

Side chapel

Nave looking toward the entrance

Baptismal font

== See also ==
- List of Jesuit sites
- 17th-century Western domes
