= Sanctissimus Dominus Noster =

Sanctissimus Dominus Noster (English: Our Most Holy Lord) is a Papal bull of Pope Urban VIII which was decreed on 13 March 1625.

The decree is not to be confused with a similar title of Pontifical coronation granted to the Philippines in 1925.

== Purpose ==
The document's main purpose was to regulate the Catholic faithful against giving devotion to deceased persons reputed to have died in holiness without the consent of the Apostolic See. The bull was also a foundational document in the history of the Catholic Church's process of beatification and canonization.

== Highlights of the document ==
In Sanctissimus Dominus Noster, Catholic faithful are told not to have images of deceased persons reputed to have died in holiness with halos, laurels and rays around their head. The bull also states that no one can print anything on alleged private revelations without the consent of the local bishop or the Apostolic See. Any violations of the bull would incur punishment.

== See also ==
- Iconography
