= Old Cathedral of Coimbra =

Romanesque Catholic building in Portugal

Coordinates: 40°12′31.6″N 8°25′37.5″W

West façade of the Old Cathedral of Coimbra

The Old Cathedral of Coimbra (Portuguese: Sé Velha de Coimbra) is a Romanesque Roman Catholic building in Portugal. Construction of the Sé Velha began some time after the Battle of Ourique (1139), when Prince Afonso Henriques declared himself King of Portugal and chose Coimbra as capital. The first Count of Coimbra, the Mozarab Sisnando Davides, is buried in the cathedral.

== History ==
Coimbra (the Roman city of Aeminium) has been the seat of a bishopric since the 5th century, after neighbouring Conimbriga was invaded and partially destroyed by the Sueves in 468. Almost nothing is known of the cathedrals that preceded the Sé Velha in Coimbra. In 1139, after the Battle of Ourique, King Afonso Henriques decided to finance the building of a new cathedral, given the bad shape of its predecessor. The definitive impulse to the project was given by Bishop Miguel Salomão, who helped pay for the works. In 1185, King Sancho I, second King of Portugal, was crowned in the new cathedral, indicating that construction was in an advanced state. The basic building was finished in the first decades of the 13th century, even though the cloisters were begun only in 1218, during the reign of King Afonso II.

The project of the Romanesque cathedral is attributed to Master Robert, a – possibly – French architect who was directing the construction of Lisbon Cathedral at the time and who visited Coimbra regularly. The works were supervised by Master Bernard, possibly also French, who was succeeded by Master Soeiro, an architect active in other churches around the Diocese of Porto.

In the 16th century there were many additions to the cathedral. The chapels, walls and pillars of the nave were covered with tiles. The monumental Porta Especiosa was built in the north side of the façade, and the southern chapel of the apse was rebuilt in Renaissance style. Nonetheless, the basic architecture and structure of the Romanesque building was left intact. In 1772, several years after the expulsion of the Jesuits from Portugal by the Marquis of Pombal, the seat of the bishopric was transferred from the old medieval cathedral to the Mannerist Jesuit church, thereafter called the New Cathedral of Coimbra (Sé Nova de Coimbra).

== Architecture ==
Coimbra Cathedral is the only one of the Portuguese Romanesque cathedrals from the Reconquista times to have survived relatively intact up to the present. The cathedrals of Porto, Braga, Lisbon and others have been extensively remodelled over time.

=== Exterior ===
From the outside, Coimbra's old cathedral looks like a small fortress, with its high, crenellated walls harbouring few, narrow windows. This menacing appearance is explained by the belligerent times in which it was built. There is a tower-like structure in the middle of the western façade with a portal and a similar-looking upper window. Both portal and window are heavily decorated with Romanesque motifs of Arabic and Pre-romanesque influences. The façade is reinforced by thick buttresses at the corners that compensate for the angle of the terrain (the cathedral was built on the slope of a hill).

The north façade has a remarkable, although eroded, Renaissance-style portal called the Porta Especiosa. The three-storey portal was built in the 1530s by French sculptor João de Ruão (Jean of Rouen). From the east side one can see the semicircular apse with its three radiating chapels; the main and the northern chapels are still Romanesque while the southern one has been rebuilt in Renaissance times. Over the transept there is a Romanesque roof lantern with some Baroque details.

=== Interior ===
The interior of the cathedral has a nave with two aisles, a small transept, and an eastern apse with three chapels. The nave is covered by barrel vaulting and the lateral aisles by groin vaults. The nave has an upper storey, a spacious triforium (arched gallery), that could accommodate more Mass attendants in the tribunes if needed. All columns of the interior have decorated capitals, mainly with vegetable motifs, but also with animals and geometric patterns. The windows of the lantern-tower and the big window in the west facade are the main sources of natural light of the cathedral.

The cloister, built during the reign of Afonso II (early 13th century), is a work of the transition between Romanesque and Gothic. Each of the Gothic pointed arches that face the courtyard encompasses two twin round arches in Romanesque style.

== Art ==
=== Capitals ===
The most remarkable aspect of the Romanesque decoration of the Old Coimbra Cathedral is the large number of sculptured capitals (around 380), which turns it into one of the most important ensembles of Romanesque sculpture in Portugal. The main motifs are vegetal and geometric and reveal Arab and pre-romanesque influences, but there are also pairs of quadrupeds (including centaurs) or birds facing each other. There are virtually no human representations, and no Biblical scenes. The absence of sculptured human figures may be because many of the artists that worked in the Cathedral were mozarabic, i.e. Christians who lived in Arab territories and who had settled in Coimbra in the 12th century. These artists were perhaps not used to human representations, which are forbidden in Islam.

=== Tombs ===
From the Gothic era (13th-14th centuries) there are several tombs with laying statues along the lateral aisles, some very much eroded. The most remarkable is that of Lady Vataça Lascaris (or Betaça), a Byzantine that came to Portugal in the beginning of the 14th century together with Elizabeth of Aragon, who was to marry King Dinis I. Her tomb carries the symbol of the Byzantine Empire: a two-headed eagle.

=== 16th century ===
At the turn of the 15th to the 16th century, Bishop Jorge de Almeida sponsored a major decorative campaign. The columns and walls of the aisles were covered with tiles from Seville, which bear multi-coloured geometric motifs reminiscent of Arab art. Most have been removed but many remain, especially in the wall to the left of the entrance of the Cathedral, as well as in many chapels and funerary monuments. Another important addition was the huge wooden retable of the main chapel, carved between 1498 and 1502 by Flemish artists Olivier de Gand and Jean d'Ypres. The retable, in Flamboyant Gothic style, illustrates the history of Mary and Christ and occupies the whole space of the Romanesque main chapel. It is the best of its kind in the country. The altar is supported by an altar table in Romanesque style.

The northern chapel (chapel of Saint Peter) has a Renaissance altar by French sculptor Nicolau Chanterene (early 16th century). The southern chapel of the apse was totally rebuilt in high Renaissance style and contains a magnificent retable featuring Jesus and the Apostles. The altar was finished around 1566 and is the work of João de Ruão (Jean of Rouen). In the 1530s, the same artist had built the Porta Especiosa in the North façade.

The transept has a nice baptismal font in Gothic-Renaissance style (1520–1540), from the church of Saint John of Almedina (São João de Almedina). The original Manueline baptismal font from Coimbra Cathedral is now in the New Cathedral of Coimbra (the former Jesuit church of the city).

== Biodiversity ==
In 2019, a new family of fungi, Aeminiaceae, was discovered in deteriorating artwork in the cathedral. The family was named after Aeminium, the Roman name of Coimbra.

== Gallery ==
Romanesque main portal on the west façade

Porta Especiosa, the Renaissance portal on the north façade

East end of the cathedral, with the apse and crossing tower

View along the nave toward the high altar

High altar

Chapel of the Holy Sacrament

Statue of the Virgin and Child in an azulejo-lined recess

Cloister

Baptismal font with carved reliefs
