= Political status of the Azores =

Flag of the Azores

The political status of the Azores is defined by the Political-Administrative Statute of the Autonomous Region of the Azores (Portuguese: Estatuto Político-Administrativo da Região Autónoma dos Açores, EPARAA), which acts as the standard legal constitutional framework for the autonomy of the Portuguese archipelago of the Azores. It defines the scope of the autonomous regional government and the structure and functioning of the region's organs of government within the framework of the 1976 Constitution of Portugal. The autonomous region of Madeira has a similar status.

== History ==
=== Carnation Revolution ===
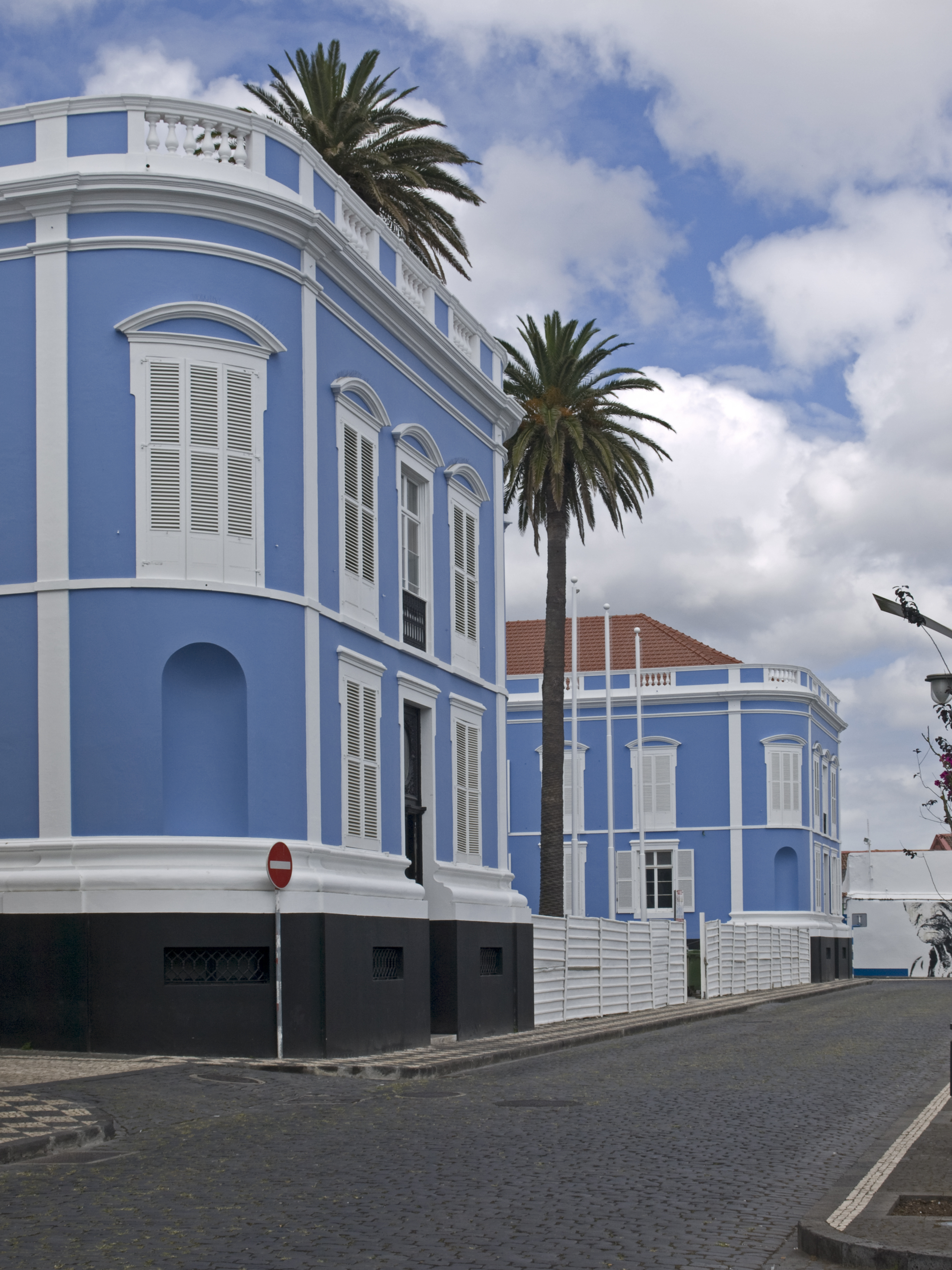
Conceição Palace in Ponta Delgada, the seat of the regional executive authority

The Carnation Revolution took place on April 25, 1974, and after an initial period of shock, it became a nucleus for social and political movements. One of the first parties to develop in the Azores was the Popular Democratic Party (Partido Popular Democrata, PPD), led in the Azores by João Bosco Soares de Mota Amaral. The PPD, later known as the Social Democratic Party (Partido Social Democrata, PSD), gained the support of the Catholic Church and positioned itself as the party of the rural-suburban populace and the middle to upper classes. The remaining parties could only get support from the intellectual class and disenfranchised youth, and were not able to gain popularity in the rural communities. An important question after the Revolution was the status of Portugal's colonies. The PPD supported autonomy for the Azores and Madeira as well as decolonization for Portugal's other colonies (there were small communities of Azoreans living in the colonies).

In May 1974, shortly after PPD was formed, it outlined its stance on insular autonomy in its declaration of principles. During a media conference in Ponta Delgada on November 8, 1974, Mota Amaral and the PPD presented the basic ideas of the Political-Administrative Statute of the Autonomous Region of the Azores. In the proposal, the PPD outlined their aspirations for the archipelago to become an autonomous region within the Portuguese Republic, as first defined by the Regional Planning Commission (Comissão de Planeamento Regional) and governed by an elected Regional Assembly. In this initial document, the General Councils (Juntas Gerais) and Executive Commissions formed after the Carnation Revolution would be maintained. The document introduced the idea that the regional capital of the Azores would rotate between the archipelago's three former district capitals: Ponta Delgada, Angra do Heroísmo, and Horta.

Taking advantage of the new liberties, the intellectual descendants of the old autonomous movement, the Movement for the Autonomy of the Azorean People (Movimento para a Autonomia do Povo Açoriano, MAPA), presented their own proposals on January 26, 1975, which essentially proposed the same changes presented by Aristides Moreira da Mota, on March 31, 1892. The engineer Deodato Magalhães de Sousa, president of the Regional Planning Commission, presented his own ideas on January 3, 1975, that basically retained the old district systems while consolidating it within a regional structure. This position was adopted by a group of influential intellectuals, that included Magalhães de Sousa, in a proposal referred to as the Project of the Group of Eleven (Projecto do Grupo dos Onze), which was publicly popular, but excluded an independent system of health and education (which would continue as outlined in the March 2, 1895 decree).

Meetings between existing rural-urban groups, and later the first insular conference (which included representatives from Madeira) held in Angra do Heroísmo on March 1–2, 1975, were made in order to find an equilibrium that would permit the development of the Azores. The failure of a right-wing coup on March 11, 1975 in Lisbon initiated in Portugal the period known as the Ongoing Revolutionary Process (Processo Revolucionário Em Curso), and in the Azores there were signs of instability. In this environment, elections to the constituent assembly were held on April 25, 1975. The PPD received 62.7% of the votes, and the Socialist Party (Partido Socialista, PS) received 28.4%. Meanwhile, instability was aggravated by separatist protests and the surge of the Azorean Liberation Front (Frente de Libertação dos Açores, FLA). These movements grew after the April 1975 meeting in Angra, which envisioned the creation of a Province of the Azores (Província dos Açores), and the abolition of the General Councils. This plan was never debated. On June 6, 1975 a protest took place in Ponta Delgada over the situation of local farmers, which quickly turned into a pro-independence rally that called for the resignation of the civil governor, António Borges Coutinho. Protesters quickly occupied the regional broadcaster, the airport and the principal infrastructures on the island of São Miguel until the governor resigned. Instances of violence grew, including the use of explosives and the arrest of affluent citizens who were detained in Angra.

Instead of the proposed models of civil government, a military government, under Portuguese Army general Altino de Magalhães, was installed. Under these circumstances, debates on autonomy were discontinued. In a meeting held in Lisbon between June 25–26, 1975, a proposal for the creation of a Governing Council of the Azores (Junta Governativa dos Açores), to substitute the civil government and General Councils were debated. The meetings included several Azorean representatives and resulted in Decree-Law N.º 458-B/75 on August 22, which established the political entities of the archipelago. The Regional Council of the Azores (Junta Regional dos Açores), was created on August 22, 1975 and assumed its functions in September. It was composed of representatives from the political movements at the time, and presided over by the military governor, General Altino de Magalhães. In the meantime, the economy had almost collapsed and emigration to the United States and Canada grew significantly. The decree-law was altered on February 2 (N.º 100/76) in order to reinforce the Regional Council of the Azores and to permit the consolidation of regional powers.

On April 25, 1975, a Constituent Assembly was elected to draft a new constitution for Portugal. There, delegates presented their ideas for Title VII of the new Portuguese Constitution, which included a provision for a statute on the Atlantic Islands. In October 1975, in an environment of great tension and motivated by their attacks on the headquarters of the Leftist parties, as well as the expulsion of their militants, the Azorean Liberation Front presented their Principles, which defended the complete independence of the Azores.

The ink was still wet on Title VII of the Constitution, when, in December 1975, the Junta Regional presented a counter-proposal to the Political-Administrative Statute of the Autonomous Region of the Azores, which was detailed in January 1976, and adapted by Portugal's Revolution Council (Conselho da Revolução) in March 1976. Discussions on the proposals were made during the 8th Commission on Title VII, which was made in a heated environment marked by a lack of trust and continued fears of separatist attacks. In this environment, the Portuguese Communist Party (Partido Comunista Português, PCP) presented a more restricted proposal in March 1976. Parliamentary debate proceeded on the 18, 20, 24-26 of March 1976, with accusations that autonomy was the principal step on the eventual independence of the regions. Modified language was approved on March 26.

=== Autonomy ===
The new Constitution of Portuguese Republic was approved on April 2, 1976, giving political autonomy to the Azores, and formalizing the regional statute in Decree-Law N.º 318-B/76 (April 30, 1976). The first elections to the Legislative Assembly of the Azores occurred on June 27, 1976, when separatist tensions and violence had abated. The elections were realized in accordance with Decree-Law N.º 318-C/76 (June 30). The PPD won these first elections and would remain in power in successive elections until 1996. The seats in the first parliament were divided: the PPD won 27, the PS won 14, and the Democratic and Social Centre – People's Party (Centro Democrático e Social – Partido Popular) won 2. The 1st Regional Legislature had its first session in the city of Horta on July 21, 1976, and it was inaugurated by then President of the Republic General Ramalho Eanes in a solemn ceremony. In a ceremony in Ponta Delgada, on September 8, 1976, and in the presence of a representative of the Republic General Galvão de Figueiredo, President João Bosco Soares da Mota Amaral began his duties, and initiated the constitutional autonomy of the Azores.

=== Revisions ===
The current autonomy definition is, despite the quite substantial changes between 1987 and 1998, the first comprehensive one approved under the conditions of the 1976 Constitution. The vote, ostensibly a consensus of the major parties of Portugal, led, nonetheless, to the "war of flags", which took the form of a series of serious protocol incidents between regional and national officials in a general display of ill-feeling. This was overcome only by the passage of time and the consolidation of the autonomy. Despite all this, there is still the question of whether Azorean citizens living outside the Azores (in Brazil, the United States, or continental Europe) should have the same voting rights as other citizens of the islands.

The current statute replaced the provisional status that had been granted, at the time of the Carnation Revolution by the legislative decree 318-B/76 of 30 April, later amended by 427-D/76 of 1 June.

The concept of "region" (which has since evolved into "autonomous region"), replaces the previous system of three distinct districts (Ponta Delgada, Angra do Heroísmo, and Horta). It was established under the auspices of the Regional Planning Authority (established by decree 48905 of 11 March 1969a). This embryonic concept of a unitary "region" was codified by the legislative Decree 458-B/75 of 22 August, which also helped create the concept of a regional administration and legislature, text which was subsequently amended by the legislative decree 100/76 of 3 February.

Passage of these regional autonomy measures was the direct result of the Revolution of 25 April, but they are also the fruits of seeds planted long ago when the movement toward regional self-government was begun. The outline of these principals was contained in the decree of 2 March 1895, promulgated at the urging of the Azorean, Ernesto Hintze Ribeiro, then Prime Minister of Portugal.

== Constitutional framework ==
The Portuguese constitution provides, in Article 161, that the Parliament has legislative and political authority to determine the political and administrative status of autonomous regions. Under the constitution, relevant laws define the key issues of autonomous status, the structure of the organs of regional governance, elements of specific interest to the region, as well as subsidiary issues of local heritage and the exercise of political power.

=== Deliberations on new laws ===
Recognizing the para-constitutional status of autonomous regions, Article 226 of the Portuguese constitution defines a special procedure for the passage of bills into law, reserving to the 'regional legislative assembly' in the Azores the right to initiate legislative measures, but providing for discussion and ratification by the Assembly of the Republic. If the national legislature rejects the text or make changes to it, the bill is returned to the Azores for regional assessment and the writing of an explanation or rebuttal. The Assembly of the Republic only carries out a final decision after having heard the opinion of the regional legislative assembly. A similar scheme is undertaken whenever statutes are amended.

=== Structure and content ===
The relevant statute was approved, then amended twice. It contains 115 articles, divided into six sections:

- General principles
- Regional bodies
- Representatives of the national government in the Azores
- Relations between the organs of national sovereignty and regional bodies
- Regional headquarters
- Economic and financial matters

=== Provisions of specific interest ===
The most important article, in that it defines the powers of self-government, is Article 8. It defines "specific provisions of interest", which are cases where regional legislation, where it exists, overrides national laws. The following areas fall in this category:

- Human resources development and the quality of life
- Cultural heritage and creativity
- Environmental protection and ecological balance
- Protection of natural resources, public health, animals and plants
- Agriculture and fishing
- Water resources, minerals, and thermal energy produced locally
- Housing, urban planning, and land use
- Traffic routes, traffic, and land transport
- Maritime and air transport between islands
- Development of trade and industry
- Tourism, folklore, and crafts
- Sports
- Organization of the regional administration and the services it performs
- Population policy, emigration, and resident status
- Protection of the territorial integrity of communities
- Oversight of companies doing business in the Azores and other cases that the regional interest warrants
- Legal status of land, including the leasing of agricultural land
- Maritime limits, exclusive exploitation zones, etc.
- Health and social security
- Labor, employment, and vocational training
- Pre-school education and private schools
- Public entertainment
- Expropriation of property and civil conscription
- Public works and facilities
- Public communications
- Foreign direct investment and technology transfers
- Adjustment of the tax system to regional circumstances
- Regional statistics
- Other areas that relate only to the region

The regional legislature can also contravene directives of the European Union that impinge on regional law, and they may submit proposals for legislation.

== 2008 revision ==
As a result of Constitutional Law No.1 (24 July 2004), which consolidates and significantly broadens the legislative capacity of the Azorean Parliament, the autonomy status of the Azores is being reviewed. There is a trend toward deepening and extending political and legislative autonomy; the door appears to be open to the creation of legislation to reflect current realities in the islands, even concerning matters that come under the heading of "sovereignty". Even in the latter case, a full self-government law could be passed, after authorization by the Assembly of the Republic. The slogan, "government of the Azores by Azoreans", used by those in the nineteenth-century independence movement, is relevant once again.

The text of an Azorean sovereignty law, approved unanimously by the Assembly of the Republic on 4 July 2008, encountered opposition from President Aníbal Cavaco Silva, who submitted the measure to the Constitutional Court as a preventive tactic. The court vetoed eight sections as unconstitutional. The president explained, in the second message to the nation of his term, his reservations, particularly regarding the conditions under which the Portuguese president can dissolve the regional assembly of the Azores. After the court referred the text to the Assembly of the Republic on 12 September 2008 so that it might address the unconstitutional provisions in it, the president warned of his intention to use his veto once unconstitutionality and policy issues were resolved. He further advised them that they must heed his criticism concerning the dissolution of the Assembly of the Azores. The bill was returned to the Assembly, which finally voted on a version very much like the original; it was passed by a majority, 60% of the members, large enough that it prevented the president from using his veto.

== Regional elections since 1976 ==
Parties are listed from left-wing to right-wing.

Summary of elections for the Legislative Assembly of the Azores, 1976–2024
Election	BE	PCP	PEV	PS	PAN	PSD	CDS	PPM	IL	CH	O/I	Turnout
1976		2.2		32.8		53.8	7.6				3.6	67.5
1980 (Note: In the 1980 election, the Communist Party (PCP) and the Portuguese Democratic Movement (MDP) ran in a joint coalition called United People Alliance (APU).)		3.2		27.3		57.4	4.5				7.6	77.0
1984 (Note: In the 1984 election, the Communist Party (PCP), Portuguese Democratic Movement (MDP) and the Ecologist Party "The Greens" (PEV) ran in a joint coalition called United People Alliance (APU).)		5.3		24.2		56.4	7.9				6.2	62.4
1988 (Note: After the 1988 elections, and still today, the Communist Party (PCP) and the Ecologist Party "The Greens" (PEV) run in a joint coalition called Unitary Democratic Coalition (CDU).)		3.8		35.5		48.6	7.1				5.0	58.9
1992		2.3		36.4		53.6	4.6				3.1	62.2
1996		3.5		45.8		41.0	7.4				2.3	59.2
2000	1.4	4.8		49.2		32.5	9.6	0.8			1.7	53.3
2004 (Note: The Social Democratic Party (PSD) and the People's Party (CDS–PP) contested the 2004 election in a coalition called Azores Coalition (CA) and won a combined 36.8% of the vote and elected 21 MP's to the regional assembly.)	1.0	2.8		57.0		36.8		0.3			2.1	55.2
2008	3.3	3.1		49.9		30.3	8.7	0.5			4.2	46.7
2012	2.3	1.9		49.2		33.0	5.7	0.1			7.8	47.9
2016	3.7	2.6		46.4	1.4	30.9	7.2	0.9			6.9	40.8
2020	3.8	1.7		39.1	1.9	33.7	5.5	2.4	1.9	5.1	4.7	45.4
2024 (Note: In the 2024 election, the Social Democratic Party (PSD), the People's Party (CDS–PP) and the People's Monarchist Party (PPM) ran in a joint coalition called PSD/CDS/PPM and won a combined 42.1% of the vote and elected 26 MP's to the regional assembly.)	2.5	1.6		35.9	1.7	42.1			2.2	9.2	4.8	50.3
Source: Comissão Nacional de Eleições
