= 2008 Azorean regional election =

- 19 October 2008

57 seats to the Legislative Assembly of Azores 29 seats needed for a majority
- Turnout: 46.7% ▼8.6 pp
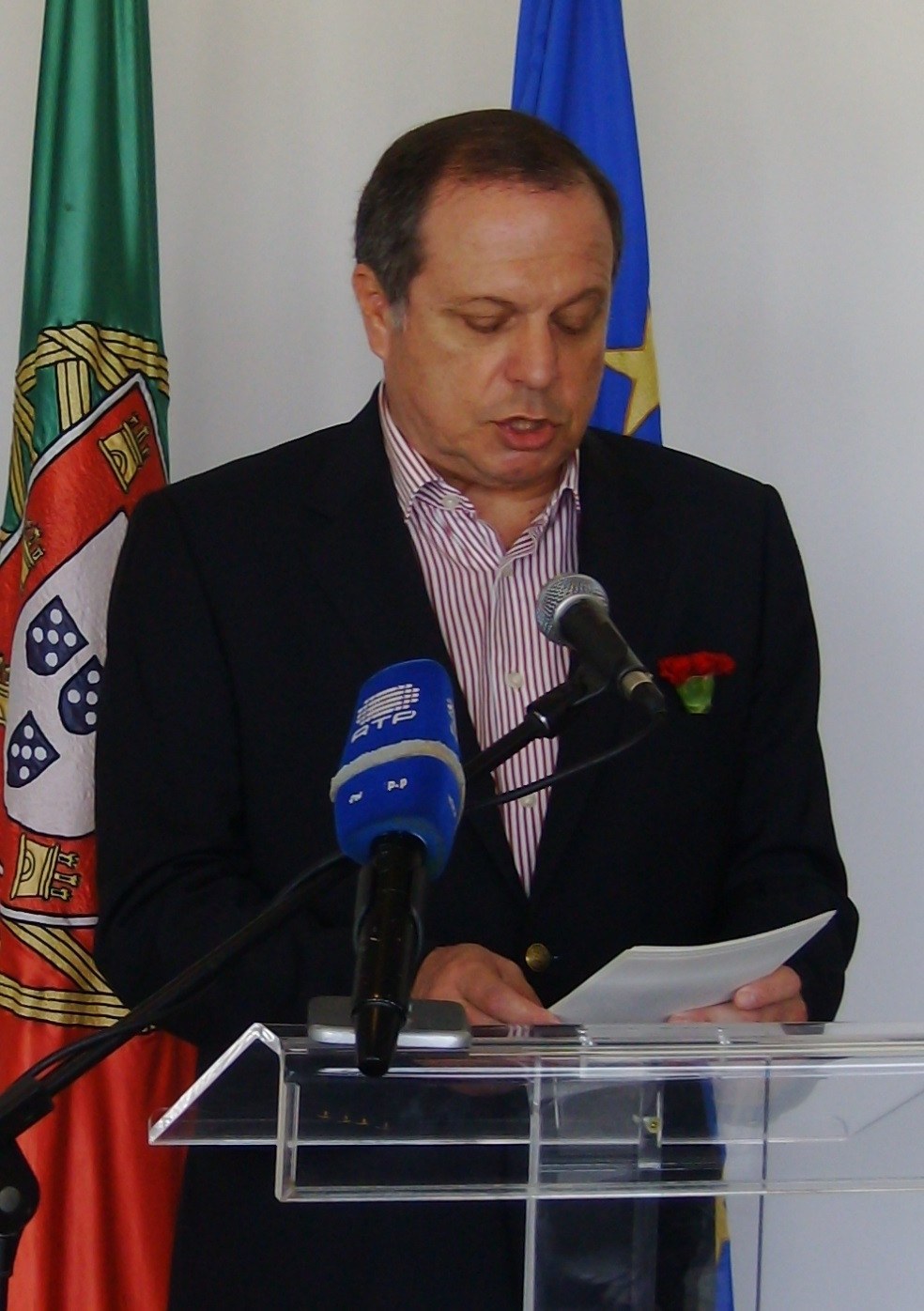

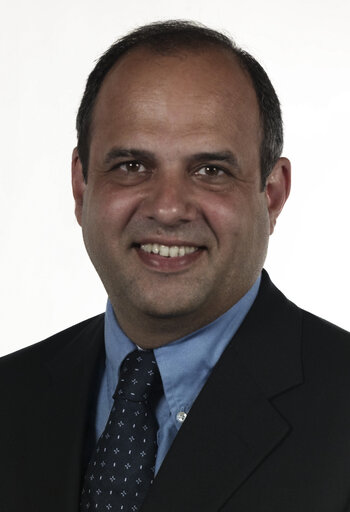

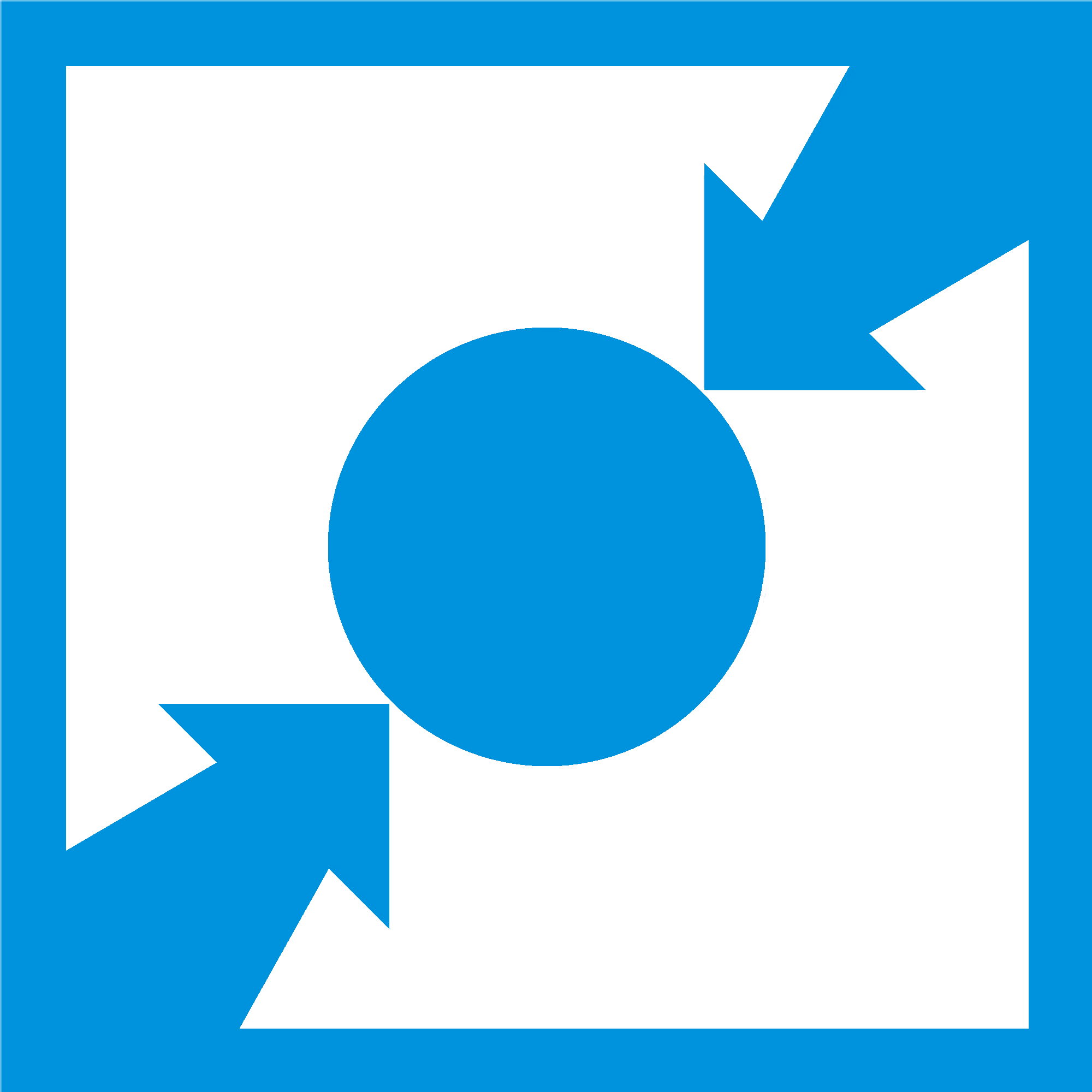

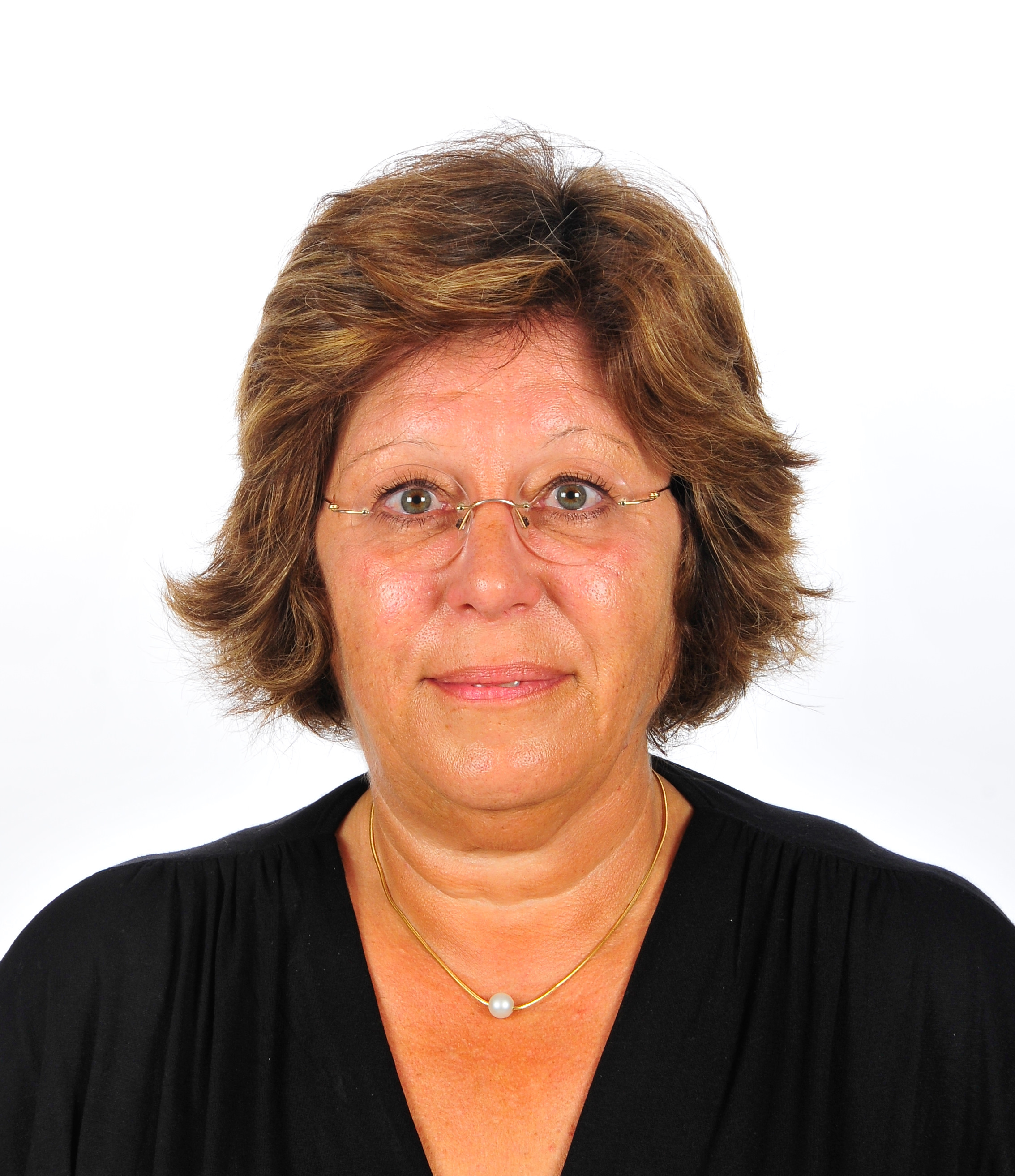

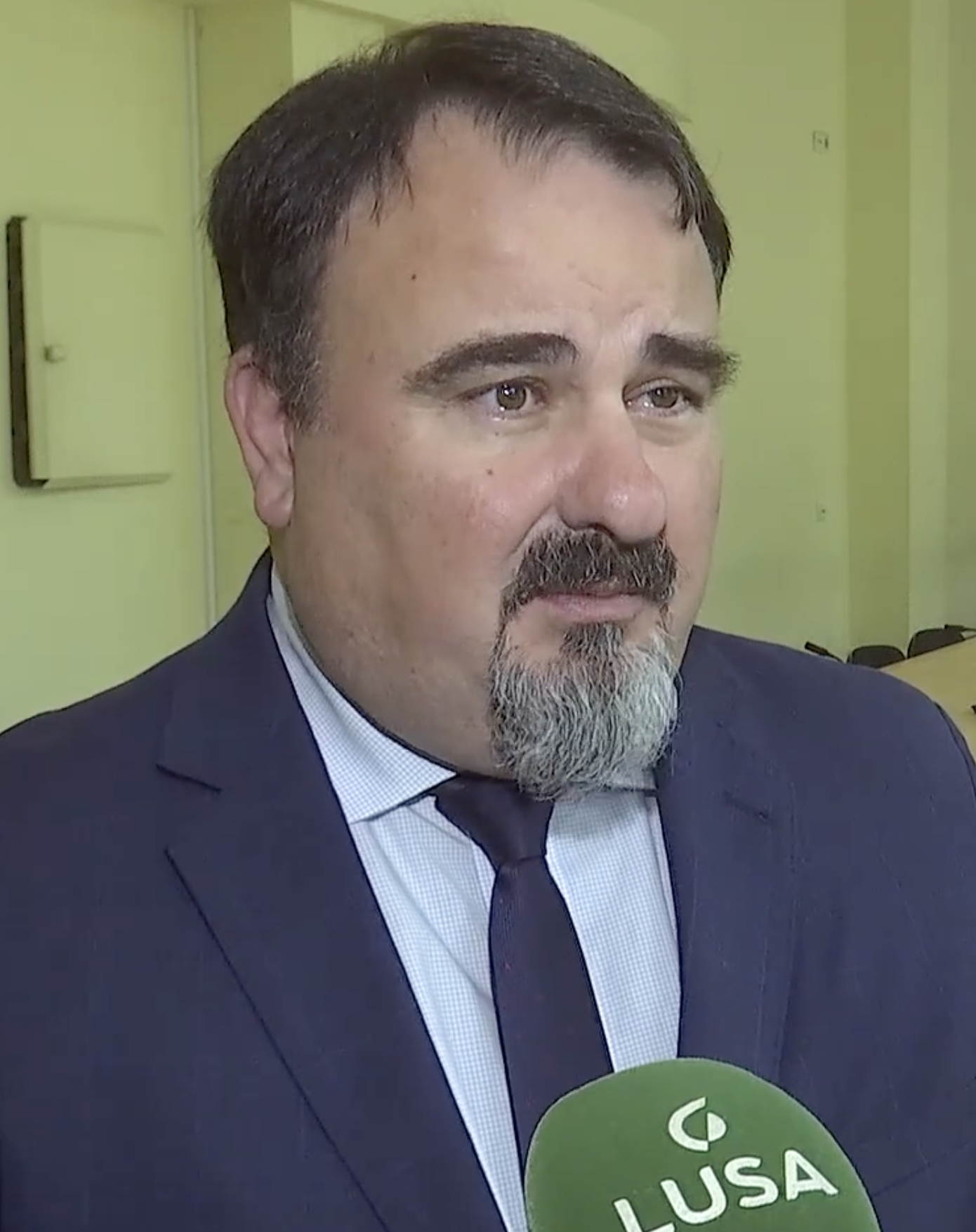
	First party	Second party	Third party
Leader	Carlos César	Carlos Costa Neves	Artur Lima
Party	PS	PSD	CDS–PP
Leader since	30 October 1994	18 December 2005	March 2007
Leader's seat	São Miguel	São Miguel	Terceira
Last election	31 seats, 57.0%	19 seats (CA) (Note: In 2004, PSD and CDS ran in a joint coalition that won 21 seats, 19 PSD and 2 CDS.)	2 seats (CA)
Seats won	30	18	5
Seat change	▼1	▼1	▲3
Popular vote	44,940	27,254	7,857
Percentage	49.9%	30.3%	8.7%
Swing	▼7.1 pp	N/A	N/A
	Fourth party	Fifth party	Sixth party
Leader	Zuraida Soares	Aníbal Pires	Paulo Estêvão
Party	BE	CDU	PPM
Leader since	2004	April 2005	2000
Leader's seat	São Miguel	São Miguel	Corvo
Last election	0 seats, 1.0%	0 seats, 2.8%	0 seats, 0.3%
Seats won	2	1	1
Seat change	▲2	▲1	▲1
Popular vote	2,972	2,829	423
Percentage	3.3%	3.1%	0.5%
Swing	▲2.3 pp	▲0.3 pp	▲0.2 pp
- Map showing island constituencies won by political parties
President before election
Carlos Cesar
PS
Elected President
Carlos Cesar
PS

The 2008 Azorean regional election (Portuguese: Eleições Regionais dos Açores de 2008) was an election held on 19 October 2008 to elect the 57 members of the regional legislative assembly for the Portuguese autonomous region of the Azores. in which the Socialist Party, under the leadership of Carlos César won a fourth mandate with 46.7 percent of the turnout, while their rivals, under the Social Democratic Party leader Carlos Costa Neves, received 30.27 percent of the vote: this result would lead to Neves' resignation in the following days.

The official campaign period occurred from 5 October to 17 October 2008, was marked by a 53.34 percent abstention rate of the 192,943 registered voters (102,735 did not cast a vote); only 90,030 people voted in this election.

== Background ==
Following their absence from the regional assembly between 2004 and 2008, the Communist Party (PCP), under their leader Aníbal C. Pires returned to campaign in a new coalition, with the Ecologist Party "The Greens". Emboldened by minor successes in the Autonomous Region of Madeira during the 2007 election, the coalition was seen as new way of reviving the party. In his speech to the national PCP assembly in 2007 he pushed for an intense campaign to support maritime natural resources exploitation and workers' rights, especially in the "disequal social and economic" centre of São Miguel.

=== Leadership changes and challenges ===
==== Social Democratic Party ====
After the defeat of the PSD/CDS–PP coalition in the 2004 regional election, then party leader Victor do Couto Cruz held on to the post for around a year until resigning and calling a leadership ballot for 18 December 2005. Two candidates were on the ballot: Carlos Costa Neves, former party leader between 1997 and 1999 and Américo Natalino Viveiros. Costa Neves was easily elected leader:

Ballot: 18 December 2005
Candidate	Votes	%
Carlos Costa Neves	154	54.8
Américo Natalino Viveiros	99	35.2
Blank/Invalid ballots	28	10.0
Turnout	281	–

== Electoral system ==
The Azores regional parliament elects 57 members through a proportional system in which the 9 islands elect a number of MPs proportional to the number of registered voters. MPs are allocated by using the d'Hondt method. For the first time, 5 members were also elected from a Compensation constituency.

Constituency	Total MPs	Registered voters
Corvo	2	342
Faial	4	11,535
Flores	3	3,219
Graciosa	3	3,781
Pico	4	11,611
Santa Maria	3	4,536
São Jorge	4	8,102
São Miguel	19	102,503
Terceira	10	45,324
Compensation	5	
Total	57	225,211

== Issues ==
The leader of the PSD, Carlos Costa Neves, promised to "move the attitude" in the party, with the objective of recuperating Azorean confidence in the party, after their defeat in the 2000 elections. Following his election to the party, Neves had defended a reorganization of the party, the mobilization and dialogue with militants, in addition to the development of innovative proposals, and noted his direct election as an affirmation of the new party politics. He warned that politics was in danger of permanent stagnation, where the discourse "in the Azores was created within the pink walls of the Palace of Santana", that the PSD was needed "a combative opposition and alternative politics".

During the campaign Aníbal Pires continued to drive a rift between national politics and the Azorean electorate, noting the divergent policies and rhetoric of Prime Minister Jóse Socrates as it dealt with the Azores: "The PS has two discourses: one on the continent and another in the Azores". The communist candidate recorded that the Prime Minister, during his election support of PS leader Carlos César, especially on milk quotes and expansion of the Azorean portion EEZ was mute. Meanwhile, the CDS, with their new slogan "Sempre ao favor dos Açorianos" (Always at the favour of Azoreans) tried to promote a more issues-oriented campaign that presented their initiatives and successes in the lead-up to the election; these included a comparative listing of the initiatives in committee, bills presented for review/debate, inter-parliamentary interventions in the assembly, projects brought to resolution through their influence and political statements.

On 21 March 2008, the CDU candidate defended a new plan to subsidize the football teams of the region, after a visit to Terceira and Graciosa, suggesting that many of the supports reach the teams late, requiring them to request loans to support inter-island travel. At the same time, Pires questioned the financing of the new hospital in Angra do Heroísmo, which he considered "obscure and unnecessary because the public sector is losing money to the private sector". He indicated that European Union financing could pay 85% of the cost, and that present accounts had enough funds to support its construction, citing the 30 year concession of lands, installations and maintenance responsibilities to the construction firm.

Aníbal Pires attacked Carlos César's "silence" on the Labour Accord for Portuguese civilians working at the Lajes Base, using it as a justification for sending CDU candidates to Horta: he alleged that the Communists were a "different voice", that placed issues of regional cohesion and worker's rights in the forefront. Cesar shrugged off the commentary, noting his defense that the new African Command (AFRICOM) should remain at Lakes, and requesting a quick response from the national government supporting the suggestion.

== Political parties ==
The political parties presented candidates lists for the campaign, where 225,211 electors could elect 57 deputies to the Legislative Assembly. Os partidos e coligações que concorreram às eleições para a Assembleia legislativa da Região Autónoma dos Açores em 2008 foram os seguintes, listados por ordem alfabética:

- Earth Party (MPT), leader Manuel Moniz.
- Democratic Party of the Atlantic (PDA), leader José Ventura. The party ran a campaign that included the support for a mandatory local history program in the regions curriculum; visiting a school in Ribeira Grande, the party leader provided a proposal to extend local history to regional schools, and improve the student evaluations. As Ventura noted: "...the student who is diligent and disciplined...at the end of the school year must have learned something", referring to problems in local schooling, that permitted some students advancing without a comprehensive understanding;
- Left Bloc (BE), leader Zuraida Soares.
- People's Monarchist Party (PPM), leader Paulo Estêvâo
- People's Party (CDS–PP), leader Artur Lima. The party promoted itself as the alternative to the natural opposition (PSD), with initiatives targeted to improve the acquisition of pharmaceutical medicines by seniors (COMPAMID), increased promotional inter-island fares (including increased flights between Terceira and combat against termite infestations, in addition to public works to the Azorean Centre of Oncology and initiatives for renewable energy on the island of Terceira.
- Socialist Party (PS), leader Carlos César.
- Social Democratic Party (PSD), leader Carlos Costa Neves.
- Unitary Democratic Coalition (PCP-PEV), in 2008 a permanent coalition between the Communist Party of Portugal (PCP) and "The Greens" was reached that allowed the integration of candidates at the regional elections. The chairman of the Azorean CDU coalition was the regional chairman for the PCP, Aníbal C. Pires, who presented his candidature, with a promise for a new policy on maritime and aviation for the region;

== Opinion polls ==
Exit poll

Polling firm/Link	Date	PS	PSD	CDS–PP	CDU	BE	O	Lead
2008 regional election	19 Oct 2008	49.9; 30	30.3; 18	8.7; 5	3.1; 1	3.3; 2	4.7; 1	19.6
UCP-CESOP	19 Oct 2008 (19:00)	51–57; 30/34	27–31; 17/20	7–9; 3/5	2–4; 2/3	2–4; 1/2	—	25
2004 regional election	17 Oct 2004	57.0; 31	36.8; 21		2.8; 0	1.0; 0	2.4; 0	20.2

== Results ==
The Regional Assembly fractured during this election, with a multi-political representation replacing the three traditional parties in parliament: the traditional parties (PS, PSD and CDS-PP) were replaced by six parties (PS, PSD, CDS-PP, BE, CDU and PPM) in the regional assembly. Part of these changes were due to the constituency compensation (Portuguese: círculo eleitoral de compensação) where several of the smallest parties were able to obtain representation: the BE elected two parliamentarians through this method, while each of the remaining parties obtained one (the exception being the PPM, which was seen as a reactionary vote for the politics that isolated the small island).

The Socialist Party under the direction of Carlos César obtained a plurality of the votes (49.96%), a reduced mandate since the 2004 elections, when his team won 57% of the total. Although the Socialists won seats in all the islands of the archipelago, they declined in the number of votes and mandates elected to the Regional Legislative Assembly: in 2004, the Socialists had 60140 votes and 31 mandates (of 52 possible) while in the most recent run they obtained 45,070 votes and 30 of 75 seats. The abstention rate continued to rise in the last elections, reaching 53.24% during these elections. Of the over 193000 registered voters, less than 90000 exercised their electoral right.

The Social Democratic Party obtained the second largest support during the elections, but obtained 20% less than the Socialists during the election (30.27% of the popular vote and electing 18 deputies). This poor result resulted in the election of 18 deputies, even when in the last round of elections, the party along with the coalition partner (the Democratic Social Centre) elected 21 parliamentarians. This result forced the PSD leader, Carlos Costa Neves, to resign his leadership of the party.

The remaining parties each obtained just over 10% of the popular vote. Constituent compensation was introduced in the new electoral law in 2006, in order to improve the proportionality of the electoral system, allowing representation for those votes cast that did not elect any deputy in the assembly.

The Democratic Social Centre (CDS-PP) under Artur Lima elected five representatives to the regional Parliament, with 8.7% of the total votes, an increase in relation to the 2004 election (when they elected two deputies, one of which later almost ran as an independent in the middle of his mandate). Speaking on election night the centrist leader, exhorted his members: "We are a Party renovated; a new CDS with representation in all the groups of islands and making one unique promise: much work as has happened until now." Thanking his candidates and militants in the party he indicated his belief that a "clean campaign and without critics" was promoted by his party, "It was a campaign of ideas, with young people, which indicates a renovation of the Party that was likely to present new ideas and proposals for the positive, that will convince the electorate that the best opposition is us."

The Left Bloc also rose in the elections, becoming the fourth political force in the Azores, with 3.3% of the votes. In comparison to the 2004 elections, when the Bloc obtained only 0.97% the vote, this election was seen as the Bloc's premiere in the Azorean Parliament, with two elected deputies.

The coalition CDU (Communists and "Greens") returned to the assembly with one deputy and 3.14% of the popular vote, an increase in the last four years (2.97%). Following the results, Aníbel Pires congratulated his forces by noting their increase in six electoral circles, and success in returning to Parliament, through the constituency compensation formula. Their results (one seat) were less than their rivals the BE, which he noted was "not relevant at the moment", but that the "voice of the Azorean people, the workers and the questions of cohesion" had returned to Parliament. Reaffirming that the "compromise that [they] made with the Azorean people will finally be completed", he added that the Socialists were unable to obtain an absolute majority, that they should "come off their pedestal and retake the capacity to hear the Azorean people".

For the first time, the PPM Partido Popular Monárquico (Popular Monarchist Party) was able to obtain representation in parliament, with its lone seat for Corvo.

Meanwhile, the PDA, the only locally based and autonomy-oriented party, fell below its expectations with only 619 votes (roughly equivalent to 0.69%) of the popular vote. These results would fracture the party leadership.

Ultimately, as Eduardo Correia indicated, the true victor in the Azores elections was the growth in the abstention rate, which achieved its highest level in the 2008 elections since the Carnation Revolution instituted free democratic elections. With 53.24% abstaining, little more than 90000 resident exercised their democratic rights, of the 193.000 registered voters.

=== Summary of votes and seats ===
Summary of the 19 October 2008 Legislative Assembly of Azores elections results
Graph of the party split among 57 seats.
Parties	Votes	%	±pp swing	MPs				
Parties	Votes	%	±pp swing	2004	2008	±	%	±
Socialist	44,940	49.92	▼7.1	31	30	▼1	52.63	▼7.0
Social Democratic	27,254	30.27		19	18	▼1	31.58	▼4.9
People's	7,857	8.73		2	5	▲3	8.77	▲4.9
Left Bloc	2,972	3.30	▲2.3	0	2	▲2	3.51	▲3.5
Democratic Unity Coalition	2,829	3.14	▲0.4	0	1	▲1	1.75	▼1.7
Earth	674	0.75	▲0.4	0	0	0	0.00	0.0
Democratic Party of the Atlantic	627	0.70	▲0.5	0	0	0	0.00	0.0
People's Monarchist	423	0.47	▲0.2	0	1	▲1	1.75	▲1.7
Total valid	87,575	97.27	▼1.2	52	57	▲5	100.00	0.0
Blank ballots	1,685	1.87	▲1.0					
Invalid ballots	770	0.86	▲0.1					
Total	90 030	100.00						
Registered voters/turnout	192,943	46.66	▼8.6					
Source: Comissão Nacional de Eleições

Vote share
PS	49.92%
PSD	30.27%
CDS-PP	8.73%
BE	3.30%
CDU	3.14%
PPM	0.47%
Others	1.45%
Blank/Invalid	2.73%

Parliamentary seats
PS	52.63%
PSD	31.58%
CDS-PP	8.77%
BE	3.51%
CDU	1.75%
PPM	1.75%

=== Distribution by constituency ===
Results of the 2008 election of the Legislative Assembly of Azores by constituency
Constituency	%	S	%	S	%	S	%	S	%	S	%	S	Total S
Constituency	PS		PSD		CDS-PP		BE		CDU		PPM		Total S
Corvo	31.6	1	13.0	-	24.6	-	0.4	-	1.1	-	26.3	1	2
Faial	41.4	2	35.8	2	4.6	-	2.8	-	10.4	-	0.4	-	4
Flores	31.8	1	30.6	1	25.8	1	0.6	-	7.5	-	0.8	-	3
Graciosa	50.4	2	39.1	1	4.6	-	1.6	-	1.2	-	0.3	-	3
Pico	47.2	2	37.9	2	7.6	-	1.4	-	2.0	-	0.4	-	4
Santa Maria	51.6	2	30.5	1	5.3	-	2.7	-	4.0	-	0.4	-	3
São Jorge	43.2	2	32.0	1	20.6	1	0.9	-	1.3	-	0.2	-	4
São Miguel	54.5	12	27.9	6	5.0	1	4.3	-	3.0	-	0.4	-	19
Terceira	46.9	6	30.3	3	13.9	1	3.1	-	2.0	-	0.3	-	10
Compensation		-		1		1		2		1		-	5
Total	49.9	30	30.3	18	8.7	5	3.3	2	3.1	1	0.5	1	57
Source: Comissão Nacional de Eleições
