= President of the Regional Government of the Azores =

- Presidente do Governo; Regional dos Açores
- Coat of arms of the Azores

- Flag of the Azores

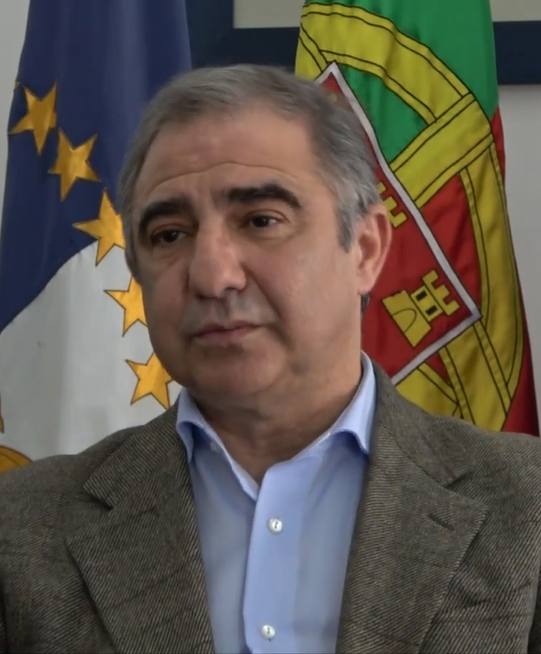
- Incumbent; José Manuel Bolieiro since 24 November 2020
- Style: His/Her Excellency
- Residence: Palace of Sant'Ana, Ponta Delgada
- Appointer: Representative of the Republic
- Term length: 4 years (Legislative Assembly of the Azores may be dissolved sooner); renewable twice consecutively.
- Inaugural holder: João Bosco Mota Amaral
- Formation: 8 September 1976
- Deputy: Artur Lima
- Website: www.azores.gov.pt

The President of the Regional Government of the Azores is the head of the devolved government of the Azores archipelago, since the Carnation Revolution that established the current constitutional regime in Portugal and granted political autonomy to the Portuguese islands.

The list below includes the leaders of the transitional regimes and those presidents designated after the institutionalization of the autonomy statute that provided the archipelago with its laws and democratic rights.

Following the first elections, held on 8 September 1976, the leader of the first party was installed as first president of the Government of the Azores (João Bosco Mota Amaral), responsible for forming his executive and cabinet to administer the functioning of the public service in the Azores.

== Presidents ==
Altino Pinto de Magalhães served as the first and only president of the Regional Junta, the provisional government that functioned during the transition towards democracy. The Military Governor of the Azores, until 22 August 1975, he was selected to preside over the Junta Governativa dos Açores (Governing Junta of the Azores), a commission that developed the Azorean autonomy statute. This commission became extinct with the first duly elected legislature and appointed government of the Azores.

The current president of the Government of the Azores is José Manuel Bolieiro, which forged a deal between all rightwing parties despite polling second place in the Azorean regional election on 25 October 2020.

The colors indicate the political affiliation of each president.

Independent
Social Democratic
Socialist

Portrait	President (Lifespan)	Term of office			Election	Party	Government
Portrait	President (Lifespan)	Start	End	Duration	Election	Party	Government
Presidents appointed in the aftermath of the Carnation Revolution (1974–1976)
	Altino Pinto de Magalhães (Note: Altino Pinto de Magalhães, former Military Governor of the Azores, served as President of the Regional Junta of the Azores, the de facto head of government following the Carnation Revolution to the taking office of Mota Amaral, the 1st President of the Regional Government of the Azores.) (1922–2019)	27 August 1975	8 September 1976	1 year, 12 days	—	Independent	—
Presidents elected under the Constitution of the Republic (1976–present)
	João Bosco Mota Amaral (born 1943)	8 September 1976	20 October 1995	19 years, 42 days	1976	Social Democratic	I
	João Bosco Mota Amaral (born 1943)	8 September 1976	20 October 1995	19 years, 42 days	1980	Social Democratic	II
	João Bosco Mota Amaral (born 1943)	8 September 1976	20 October 1995	19 years, 42 days	1984	Social Democratic	III
	João Bosco Mota Amaral (born 1943)	8 September 1976	20 October 1995	19 years, 42 days	1988	Social Democratic	IV
	João Bosco Mota Amaral (born 1943)	8 September 1976	20 October 1995	19 years, 42 days	1992	Social Democratic	V
	Alberto Madruga da Costa (1940–2014)	20 October 1995	9 November 1996	1 year, 19 days	—	Social Democratic	VI
	Carlos César (born 1956)	9 November 1996	6 November 2012	15 years, 362 days	1996	Socialist	VII
	Carlos César (born 1956)	9 November 1996	6 November 2012	15 years, 362 days	2000	Socialist	VIII
	Carlos César (born 1956)	9 November 1996	6 November 2012	15 years, 362 days	2004	Socialist	IX
	Carlos César (born 1956)	9 November 1996	6 November 2012	15 years, 362 days	2008	Socialist	X
	Vasco Cordeiro (born 1973)	6 November 2012	24 November 2020	8 years, 18 days	2012	Socialist	XI
	Vasco Cordeiro (born 1973)	6 November 2012	24 November 2020	8 years, 18 days	2016	Socialist	XII
	José Manuel Bolieiro (born 1965)	24 November 2020	Incumbent	5 years, 330 days	2020	Social Democratic	XIII (Note: Coalition government PSD-CDS–PP-PPM; Confidence & supply gov't: PSD/CDS-PP/PPM ⇐ (CHEGA–IL).)
	José Manuel Bolieiro (born 1965)	24 November 2020	Incumbent	5 years, 330 days	2024	Social Democratic	XIV

== See also ==
- President of the Regional Government of Madeira
- Regional Government of the Azores (in Portuguese)
