= 2000 Azorean regional election =

- 15 October 2000

52 seats to the Legislative Assembly of Azores 27 seats needed for a majority
- Turnout: 53.3% ▼5.9 pp
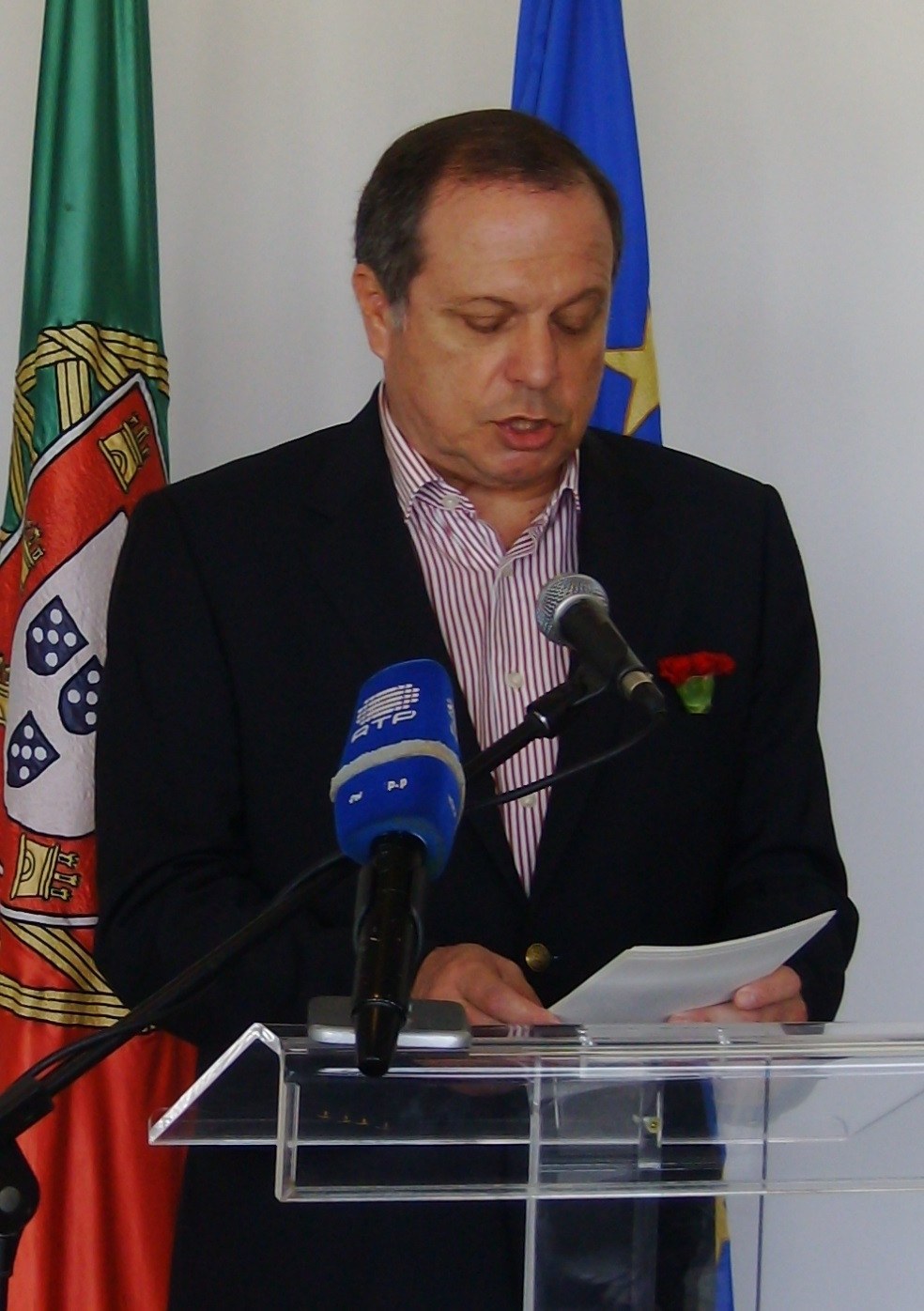

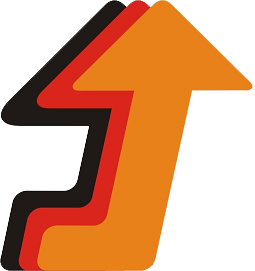
	First party	Second party
Leader	Carlos César	Manuel Arruda
Party	PS	PSD
Leader's seat	São Miguel	São Miguel
Last election	24 seats, 45.8%	24 seats, 41.0%
Seats won	30	18
Seat change	▲6	▼6
Popular vote	49,438	32,642
Percentage	49.2%	32.5%
Swing	▲3.4 pp	▼8.5 pp
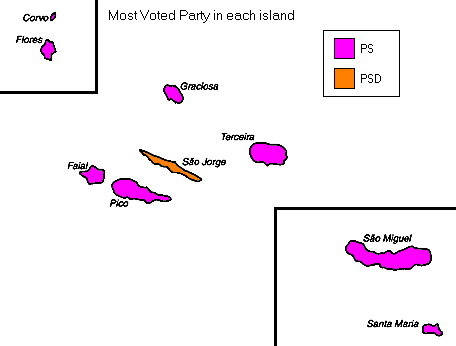
- Map of Azores showing constituencies won
President before election
Carlos César
PS
Elected President
Carlos César
PS

The Azores regional election, 2000 (Portuguese: Eleições Regionais dos Açores, 2000) was an election held on 15 October 2000 to elect the 52 members of the regional legislative assembly for the Portuguese autonomous region of the Azores. The Socialist Party, under the leadership of Carlos César was reelected, receiving 49 percent of the votes, and winning an absolute majority, while their direct rivals, the Social Democratic Party fell to just 32 percent. Voter turnout was the lowest to date, with just 53.3 percent of the electorate casting their ballot on election day.

== Background ==
In the Azores, there were 52 seats in the Regional Parliament in dispute, the same of the previous election, in 1996. The seats were distributed by the nine islands of the archipelago proportionally to the population of each island; however, each island is entitled to at least two members of parliament.

== Electoral system ==
For the 2000 election, the Azores regional parliament elected 52 members through a proportional system in which the nine islands elect a number of MPs proportional to the number of registered voters. MPs are allocated by using the D'Hondt method.

Constituency	Total MPs	Registered voters
Corvo	2	341
Faial	4	11,519
Flores	3	3,241
Graciosa	3	3,936
Pico	4	11,836
Santa Maria	3	4,432
São Jorge	4	7,912
São Miguel	19	98,490
Terceira	10	44,623
Total	52	186,330

== Political parties ==
The political parties, movements and alliances during these elections mirrored many of the parties that appeared in the national legislative and/or European elections of that year, but specifically included the following:

- Left Bloc (BE)
- People's Monarchist Party-Democratic Party of the Atlantic (PPM-PDA), actually two independent parties; the PPM and PDA, ran as a coalition; leaders of each party: Miguel Pignatelli Queirós (PPM) and Joaquim de Aguiar Cabral (PDA)
- People's Party (CDS–PP);
- Socialist Party (PS);
- Social Democratic Party (PSD), leader Manuel Arruda
- Unitary Democratic Coalition (CDU), is a coalition between the Portuguese Communist Party (PCP) Açores and the Greens (PEV)

== Results ==
For a second term, the Socialist Party won the regional election in Azores, increasing its share of the vote from 45% to 49%, and re-electing Carlos César to the presidency of the Regional Government. With the Social Democrats losing seats, César and his party obtained an absolute majority of 30 seats out of the assembly's 52 seats.

The Social Democrats, who had dominated the island's politics since the Carnation Revolution, lost almost 10% of the vote, and six MPs, following four years of deep internal divisions. The People's Party (CDS), despite increasing their share of the vote (by more than 2%), lost one of their representatives, due to the application of the Hondt election model in the nine islands. The People's Monarchist Party, which had not participated in the previous election, ran in coalition with the Democratic Party of the Atlantic, but was unsuccessful in obtaining any representation. The Unitary Democratic Coalition (CDU), led by the Portuguese Communist Party (PCP) raised their popular vote by 1%, achieving another deputy (on the island of Faial).

After aligning itself with many of the smaller left-of-centre parties, the People's Democratic Union (UDP), elements of the party merged with the Left Bloc, but did not achieve any representation.

=== Summary of votes and seats ===
Summary of the 15 October 2000 Legislative Assembly of the Azores election results
Graph of the party split among 52 seats.
Parties	Votes	%	±pp swing	MPs				
Parties	Votes	%	±pp swing	1996	2000	±	%	±
Socialist	49,438	49.20	▲3.4	24	30	▲6	57.69	▲11.5
Social Democratic	32,642	32.48	▼8.5	24	18	▼6	34.62	▼11.5
People's	9,605	9.56	▲2.2	3	2	▼1	3.85	▼1.9
Democratic Unity Coalition	4,856	4.83	▲1.4	1	2	▲1	3.85	▲1.9
Left Bloc	1,387	1.38	—N/a	—N/a	0	—N/a	0.00	—N/a
PPM / PDA	799	0.80	—N/a	—N/a	0	—N/a	0.00	—N/a
Total valid	98,727	98.25	▼0.6	52	52	0	100.00	0.0
Blank ballots	895	0.89	▲0.3					
Invalid ballots	862	0.86	▲0.3					
Total	100,484	100.00						
Registered voters/turnout	188,543	53.30	▼5.9					
Source: Comissão Nacional de Eleições

Vote share
PS	49.20%
PSD	32.48%
CDS-PP	9.56%
CDU	4.83%
BE	1.83%
PPM/PDA	0.80%
Blank/Invalid	1.75%

Parliamentary seats
PS	57.69%
PSD	34.62%
CDS-PP	3.85%
CDU	3.85%

=== Distribution by constituency ===
Results of the 2000 election of the Legislative Assembly of Azores by constituency
Constituency	%	S	%	S	%	S	%	S	Total S
Constituency	PS		PSD		CDS-PP		CDU		Total S
Corvo	32.5	1	31.8	1	31.1	-			2
Faial	35.4	2	30.2	1	3.8	-	27.8	1	4
Flores	26.9	1	26.8	1	21.8	-	21.9	1	3
Graciosa	51.4	2	42.0	1	3.2	-	1.1	-	3
Pico	45.4	2	44.2	2	5.7	-	1.9	-	4
Santa Maria	65.7	2	24.5	1	5.0	-	1.4	-	3
São Jorge	34.0	2	45.4	2	15.5	-	1.3	-	4
São Miguel	53.3	12	30.1	6	8.7	1	3.2	-	19
Terceira	49.5	6	32.2	3	12.8	1	2.3	-	10
Total	49.2	30	32.4	18	9.6	2	4.8	2	52
Source: Comissão Nacional de Eleições Archived 2021-12-19 at the Wayback Machine

=== Maps ===
Map showing island constituencies won by political parties.

== See also ==
- 2000 Madeiran regional election
