= Autonomic Insignias of the Azores =

Type of honour award in the Azores region, Portugal

The Azorean Autonomic Insignia are regional honours in the Azores region, Portugal, which were created by Regional Legislative Decree n. 36/2002/A, of 28 November and are regulated by Regional Legislative Decree n. 10/2006/A, of 20 March. The aim of the honours are to distinguish, in life or posthumously, citizens or legal persons who stand out for personal or institutional merits, acts, civic deeds or services rendered to the Azorean people. The attribution of the Azorean Autonomic Insignia is made through parliamentary decision and they are usually awarded on the Region's Day, in a solemn session co-chaired by the Presidents of the Legislative Assembly and the Regional Government of the Azores.

== Categories ==
Pursuant to Article 3 of Regional Legislative Decree No. 36/2002/A of 28 November, the Azorean Autonomic Insignia fall in four categories:

- Autonomic Insignia of Valour (Insígnia Autonómica de Valor);
- Autonomic Insignia of Recognition (Insígnia Autonómica de Reconhecimento);
- Autonomic Insignia of Merit (Insígnia Autonómica de Mérito);
- Autonomic Insignia of Dedication (Insígnia Autonómica de Dedicação)

=== Autonomic Insignia of Valour ===
Is to be bestowed upon those who:

- had an exceptionally relevant performance in positions of Azorean governing bodies or in the service of the Region;
- performed civic feats of great relief.

The physical insignia is constituted by four separate pieces (breast star, collar, medal and rosette).

=== Autonomic Insignia of Recognition ===
It is intended to distinguish acts or conduct of exceptional relevance performed by Portuguese or foreign nationals who:

- value and honor the Region at home or abroad or contribute to it; contribute to the expansion of Azorean culture or to the knowledge of the Azores and its history; They are distinguished by their literary, scientific, artistic or sporting merit.

The physical insignia is constituted by three separate pieces (collar, medal and rosette).

=== Autonomic Insignia of Merit ===
It aims to distinguish meritorious acts or services performed by Portuguese or foreign citizens in the exercise of any public or private functions. The insignia consists of two pieces (medal and rosette), it is divided into three categories:

==== Profissional Merit ====
Rewards outstanding performance in any professional activity, whether on their own or on behalf of others.

==== Industrial, Commercial and Agricultural Merit ====
Reward those who, having developed their activities in the industrial, commercial or agricultural areas, have been highlighted by relevant services for their development or exceptional merits in their performance.

==== Civic Merit ====
This insignia is intended to reward those who, as a result of a clear understanding of civic duties, have made a significant contribution to community service, particularly in the areas of social and cultural action.

=== Autonomic Insignia of Dedication ===
It aims to highlight relevant services rendered in the performance of duties in the Public Administration, as well as to reward those employees who demonstrate unusual qualities within their career and who, by their behavior, can be mentioned as an example to follow.

== Bibliography ==
- Governo dos Açores. Insígnias Honoríficas Açorianas. s.l.: s.e., s.d. [2008].
