= 2004 Azorean regional election =

- 17 October 2004

52 seats to the Legislative Assembly of Azores 27 seats needed for a majority
- Turnout: 55.2% ▲1.9 pp
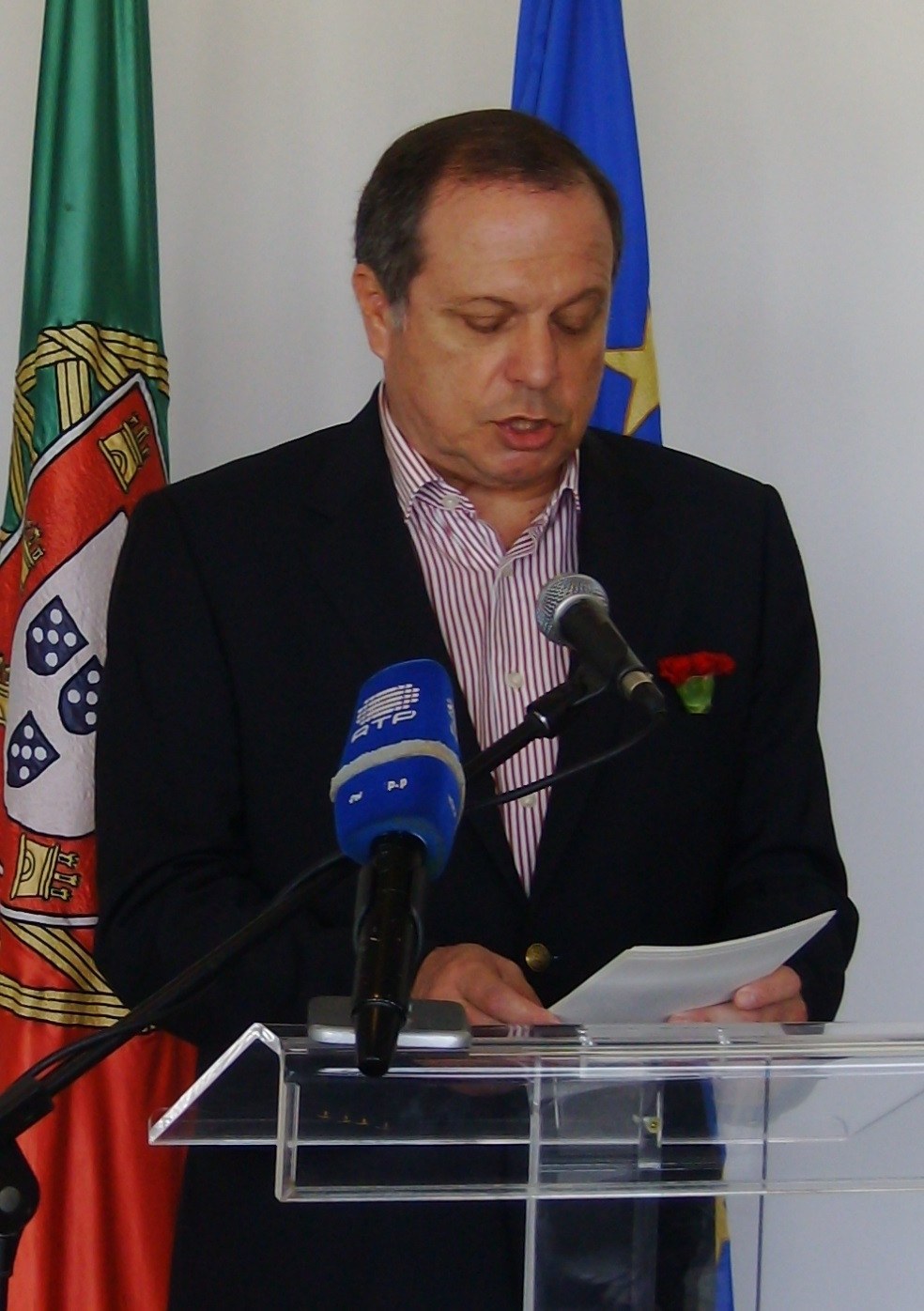

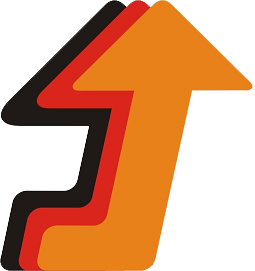
	First party	Second party
Leader	Carlos César	Victor do Couto Cruz
Party	PS	PSD
Alliance		CA
Leader's seat	São Miguel	São Miguel
Last election	30 seats, 49.2%	20 seats, 42.1%
Seats won	31	21
Seat change	▲1	▲1
Popular vote	60,140	38,883
Percentage	57.0%	36.8%
Swing	▲7.8 pp	▼5.3 pp
President before election
Carlos César
PS
Elected President
Carlos César
PS

The Azores Regional Election, 2004 (Portuguese: Eleições Regionais dos Açores, 2004) was an election held on 17 October 2004 to elect the 52 members of the regional legislative assembly for the Portuguese autonomous region of the Azores. The Socialist Party, under the leadership of Carlos César won 57 percent of the votes, and renewed their absolute majority, for the 2nd consecutive time. The Social Democratic Party ran in a coalition with the People's Party, called Azores Coalition, but suffered a heavy defeat, gathering just 37 percent of the votes.

Voter turnout increased, for the first time since the 1992 election, with 55.2 percent of the electorate casting their ballot on election day.

== Background ==
In the Azores, there were 52 seats in the Regional Parliament in dispute, the same of the previous election, in 2000. The seats were distributed by the 9 islands of the archipelago proportionally to the population of each island; however, each island is entitled to at least two members of parliament.

== Electoral system ==
For the 2004 election, the Azores regional parliament elected 52 members through a proportional system in which the 9 islands elect a number of MPs proportional to the number of registered voters. MPs are allocated by using the D'Hondt method.

Constituency	Total MPs	Registered voters
Corvo	2	350
Faial	4	11,451
Flores	3	3,211
Graciosa	3	3,817
Pico	4	11,820
Santa Maria	3	4,508
São Jorge	4	7,967
São Miguel	19	99,854
Terceira	10	44,787
Total	52	187,765

== Political parties ==
A total of 7 parties and/or coalitions ran in these elections. The parties/coalitions listed on the voting ballots were the following:

- Left Bloc (BE);
- Earth Party (MPT);
- Democratic Party of the Atlantic (PDA);
- People's Monarchist Party (PPM);
- Socialist Party (PS), leader Carlos César;
- Social Democratic Party / People's Party (PSD/CDS–PP) Azores Coalition (CA), leader Victor do Couto Cruz
- Unitary Democratic Coalition (CDU);

== Results ==
For a third consecutive term, the Socialist Party won the regional election in Azores, increasing its share of the vote from 49% to 57%, and re-electing Carlos César to the presidency of the Regional Government. César and his party obtained an absolute majority with 31 of the assembly's 52 seats.

The Social Democrats and the People's Party contested the election in a joint coalition called "Azores Coalition". The coalition achieved a very disappointing result, polling 20% below the Socialists. The PSD/CDS-PP coalition only won 37% of the votes, but was able to increase the number of parliament members to 21, against the combined total of 20 both parties won in 2000. In fact, the bad result from this PSD/CDS-PP coalition was one of the reasons PSD and CDS didn't contest, in a coalition, the 2005 general elections. Due to the strong bipolarization of the race, both PS and PSD/CDS-PP gathered a total of almost 94% of the votes, and due to the application of the Hondt election model in the nine islands, the smaller parties were severely punished. The Unitary Democratic Coalition (CDU), led by the Portuguese Communist Party (PCP), saw their share of vote reduced by almost half and they lost all representation in the regional parliament. The Left Bloc also suffered a setback by polling below 1%.

The People's Monarchist Party, the Earth Party and the Democratic Party of the Atlantic also failed to make any inroads.

=== Summary of votes and seats ===
Summary of the 17 October 2004 Legislative Assembly of the Azores election results
Graph of the party split among 52 seats.
Parties	Votes	%	±pp swing	MPs				
Parties	Votes	%	±pp swing	2000	2004	±	%	±
Socialist	60,140	56.97	▲7.8	30	31	▲1	59.62	▲1.9
Azores Coalition (PSD / CDS–PP)	38,883	36.84	▼5.3	20	21	▲1	40.38	▲1.9
Democratic Unity Coalition	2,942	2.79	▼2.0	2	0	▼2	0.00	▼3.9
Left Bloc	1,022	0.97	▼0.4	0	0	0	0.00	0
Earth	369	0.35	—N/a	—N/a	0	—N/a	0.00	—N/a
People's Monarchist	293	0.28	—N/a	—N/a	0	—N/a	0.00	—N/a
Democratic Party of the Atlantic	248	0.23	—N/a	—N/a	0	—N/a	0.00	—N/a
Total valid	103,897	98.43	▲0.2	52	52	0	100.00	0.0
Blank ballots	879	0.83	▼0.1					
Invalid ballots	780	0.74	▼0.1					
Total	105,556	100.00						
Registered voters/turnout	191,127	55.23	▲1.9					
Source: Comissão Nacional de Eleições Archived 2021-12-19 at the Wayback Machine

Vote share
PS	56.97%
CA (PSD/CDS-PP)	36.84%
CDU	2.79%
BE	0.97%
Others	0.86%
Blank/Invalid	1.57%

Parliamentary seats
PS	59.62%
CA (PSD/CDS-PP)	40.38%

=== Distribution by constituency ===
Results of the 2004 election of the Legislative Assembly of Azores by constituency
Constituency	%	S	%	S	Total S
Constituency	PS		CA		Total S
Corvo	49.4	1	36.1	1	2
Faial	39.8	2	40.2	2	4
Flores	46.2	2	35.9	1	3
Graciosa	52.7	2	44.3	1	3
Pico	49.4	2	46.3	2	4
Santa Maria	68.7	2	25.5	1	3
São Jorge	44.3	2	50.7	2	4
São Miguel	65.6	12	33.8	7	19
Terceira	59.1	6	37.0	4	10
Total	57.0	31	36.8	21	52
Source: Comissão Nacional de Eleições Archived 2021-12-19 at the Wayback Machine

=== Maps ===
Map showing island constituencies won by political parties.

== See also ==
- 2004 Madeiran regional election
