= 1996 Azorean regional election =

- 13 October 1996

52 seats to the Legislative Assembly of Azores 27 seats needed for a majority
- Turnout: 59.2% ▼3.0 pp
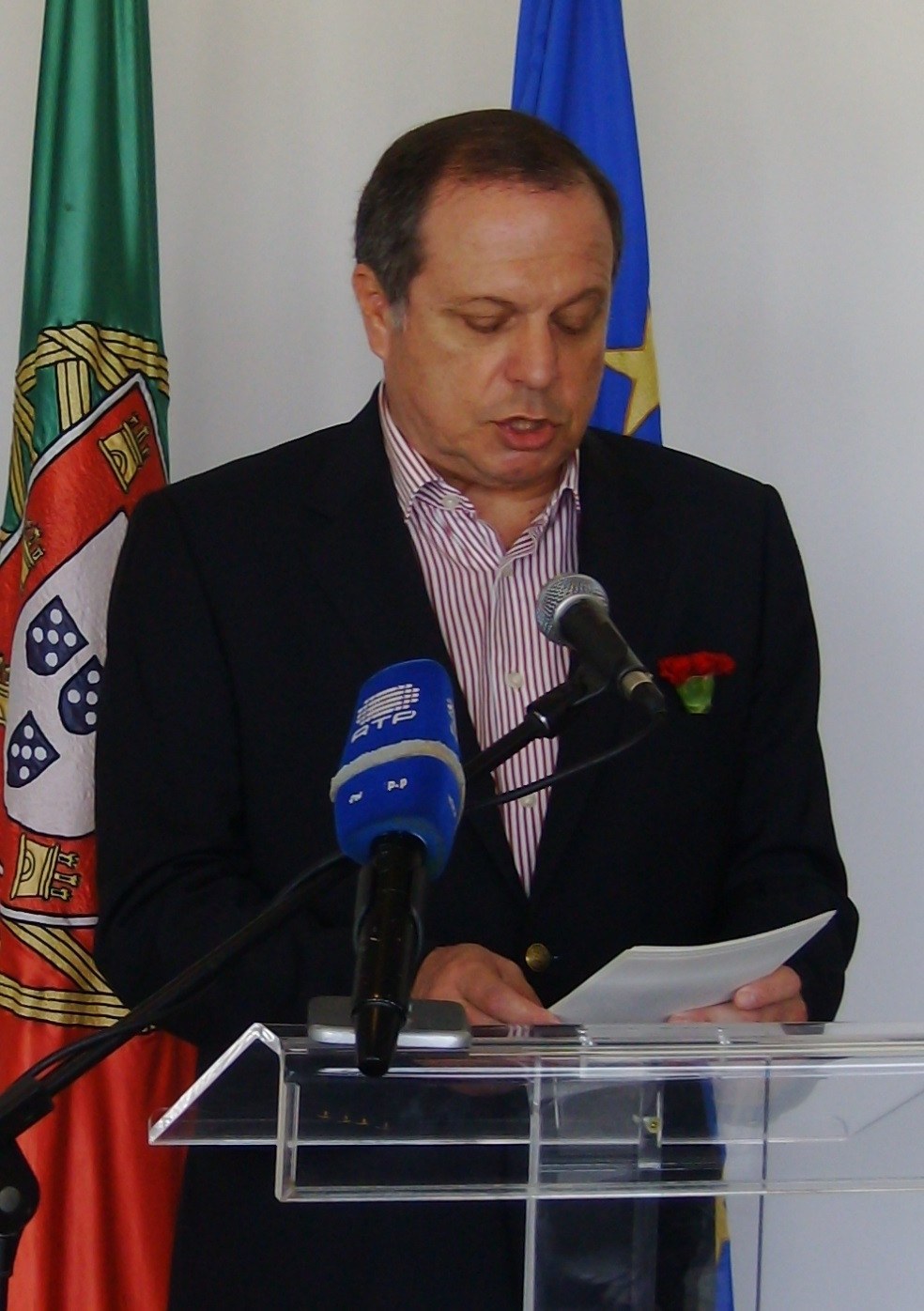

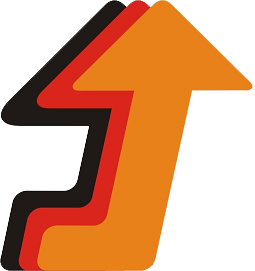
	First party	Second party
Leader	Carlos César	Álvaro Dâmaso
Party	PS	PSD
Leader's seat	São Miguel	São Miguel
Last election	21 seats, 36.4%	28 seats, 53.6%
Seats won	24	24
Seat change	▲3	▼4
Popular vote	51,906	46,449
Percentage	45.8%	41.0%
Swing	▲9.4 pp	▼12.6 pp
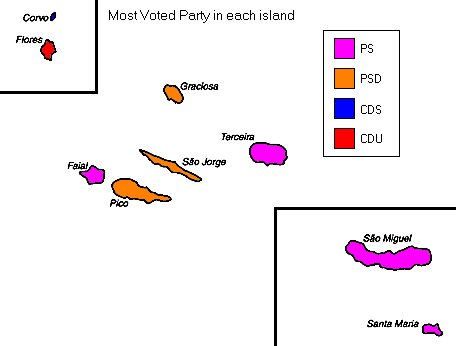
- Map of Azores showing constituencies won
President before election
Alberto Costa
PSD
Elected President
Carlos César
PS

The 1996 Azores Regional Election (Portuguese: Eleições Regionais dos Açores, 1996) was an election held on 13 October 1996 to elected the 52 seats for the regional legislative assembly of the Portuguese autonomous region of the Azores.

The Socialist Party, under the leadership of Carlos César, won with 45 percent of the votes, while their direct rivals, the Social Democratic Party, won 41 percent of the votes, although both parties tied in seats, each party winning 24 MPs. It was the first victory of the Socialists in a regional election since democracy was restored, with the PS holding on to the status as the largest party in the assembly until 2024.

Voter turnout was relatively high with just over 59.17 percent of the electorate casting their ballot on election day.

== Electoral system ==
For the 1996 election, the Azores regional parliament elected 52 members through a proportional system in which the 9 islands elect a number of MPs proportional to the number of registered voters. MPs are allocated by using the D'Hondt method.

Constituency	Total MPs	Registered voters
Corvo	2	
Faial	4	
Flores	3	
Graciosa	3	
Pico	4	
Santa Maria	3	
São Jorge	4	
São Miguel	19	
Terceira	10	
Total	52	

== Political parties ==
A total of 6 political parties presented lists of candidates for the regional elections in the Azores, where 191,477 electors could elect 52 deputies to the Legislative Assembly. Of these parties, some of the more prominent:

- Democratic Party of the Atlantic (PDA).
- Democratic Unity Coalition (CDU), an alliance of the Greens and Portuguese Communist Party (PCP).
- People's Democratic Union (UDP).
- People's Party (CDS-PP), an alliance with the People's Monarchist Party (PPM).
- Socialist Party (PS), leader Carlos César.
- Social Democratic Party (PSD), leader Álvaro Dâmaso.

== Results ==
The winner of the election was the Socialist Party which, for the first time received a plurality of the public vote, although they obtained a comparable number of representatives in the Regional Assembly.

After 20 years of successive right-of-centre Social Democratic victories, Carlos Manuel Martins do Vale César became the new president of the Regional Government, succeeding Alberto Romão Madruga da Costa.

At the same time, the Democratic Alliance of the Azores lost its only deputy, while the People's Party (which had not participated in the last election) elected three deputies (with 7% of the vote). Meanwhile, the Unitary Democratic Coalition, led by the Portuguese Communist Party maintained its one deputy MP by electing one deputy on the island of Flores. The People's Democratic Union did not elect a single deputy.

=== Summary of votes and seats ===
Summary of the 13 October 1996 Legislative Assembly of Azores elections results
Graph of the party split among 52 seats.
Parties	Votes	%	±pp swing	MPs				
Parties	Votes	%	±pp swing	1992	1996	±	%	±
Socialist	51,906	45.82	▲9.4	21	24	▲3	46.15	▲5.0
Social Democratic	46,449	41.00	▼12.6	28	24	▼4	46.15	▼8.7
People's (Note: The People's Party contested the 1992 election in an alliance formed by the People's Party (1 seat) and the People's Monarchist Party (0 seats).)	8,346	7.37	—N/a	1	3	▲2	5.77	▲3.8
Democratic Unity Coalition	3,940	3.48	▲1.2	1	1	0	1.92	▼0.1
People's Democratic Union	983	0.87	—N/a	—N/a	0	—N/a	0.00	—N/a
Democratic Party of the Atlantic	340	0.30	▼1.1	0	0	0	0.00	0.0
Total valid	111,964	98.83	▲0.5	51	52	▲1	100.00	0.0
Blank ballots	705	0.62	▲0.1					
Invalid ballots	624	0.55	▼0.6					
Total	113,293	100.00						
Registered voters/turnout	191,477	59.17	▼3.0					
Source: Comissão Nacional de Eleições Archived 2012-05-16 at the Wayback Machine

Vote share
PS	45.82%
PSD	41.00%
CDS-PP	7.37%
CDU	3.48%
UDP	0.87%
PDA	0.30%
Blank/Invalid	1.17%

Parliamentary seats
PS	46.15%
PSD	46.15%
CDS-PP	5.77%
CDU	1.92%

=== Distribution by constituency ===
Results of the 1996 election of the Legislative Assembly of Azores by constituency
Constituency	%	S	%	S	%	S	%	S	Total S
Constituency	PS		PSD		CDS-PP		CDU		Total S
Corvo	29.3	-	32.9	1	35.8	1			2
Faial	44.6	2	41.7	2	6.4	-	5.5	-	4
Flores	19.6	1	30.9	1	14.9	-	33.4	1	3
Graciosa	42.5	1	53.2	2	1.9	-	0.7	-	3
Pico	41.6	2	50.4	2	4.7	-	1.7	-	4
Santa Maria	60.6	2	32.3	1	4.0	-	1.5	-	3
São Jorge	29.7	1	56.0	3	12.5	-	1.0	-	4
São Miguel	46.6	10	40.3	8	5.9	1	3.8	-	19
Terceira	50.4	5	36.8	4	10.2	1	1.2	-	10
Total	45.8	24	41.0	24	7.4	3	3.5	1	52
Source: Comissão Nacional de Eleições Archived 2012-05-16 at the Wayback Machine

=== Maps ===
Map showing island constituencies won by political parties.

== Aftermath ==
=== Government approval ===
For the first time since democracy was established, the PSD failed to remain as the most voted party in the Azores and the PS formed a minority government. CDS – People's Party (CDS–PP) supported, from the outside, the PS minority government. On 22 November 1996, the regional parliament approved the first center-left government in Azorean history:

1996 Motion of confidence Carlos César (PS)
Ballot →	22 November 1996
Required majority →	Simple
Yes: • PS (24); • CDS–PP (3)	27 / 52
No: • PSD (24)	24 / 52
Abstentions: • PCP (1)	1 / 52
Absentees	0 / 52
Result →	Approved

== See also ==
- 1996 Madeiran regional election
