= 1976 Azorean regional election =

- 27 June 1976

43 seats to the Legislative Assembly of the Azores 22 seats needed for a majority
- Turnout: 67.5%
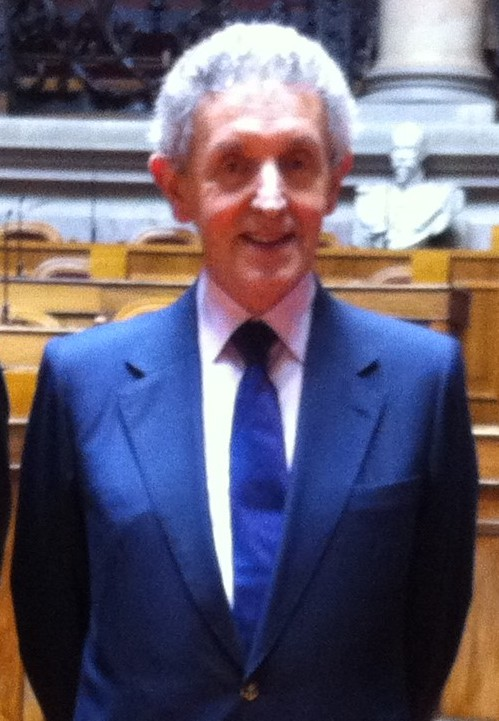

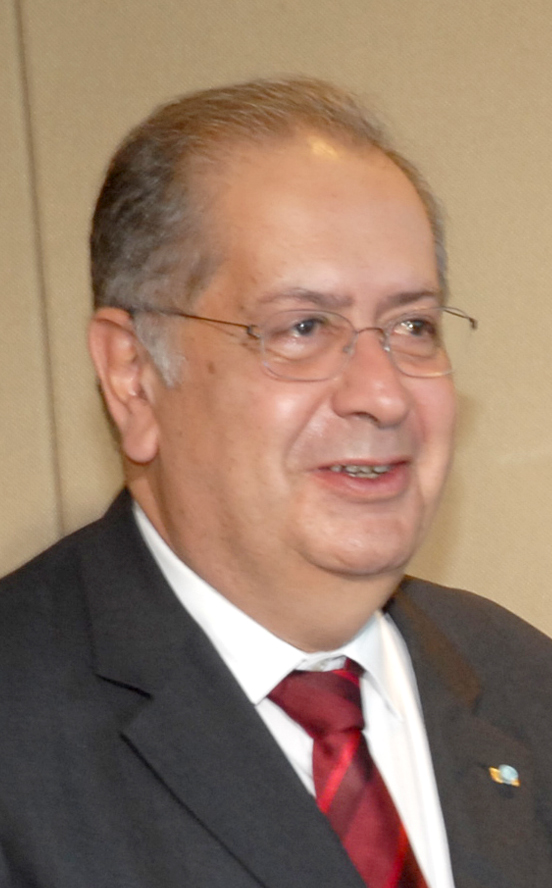

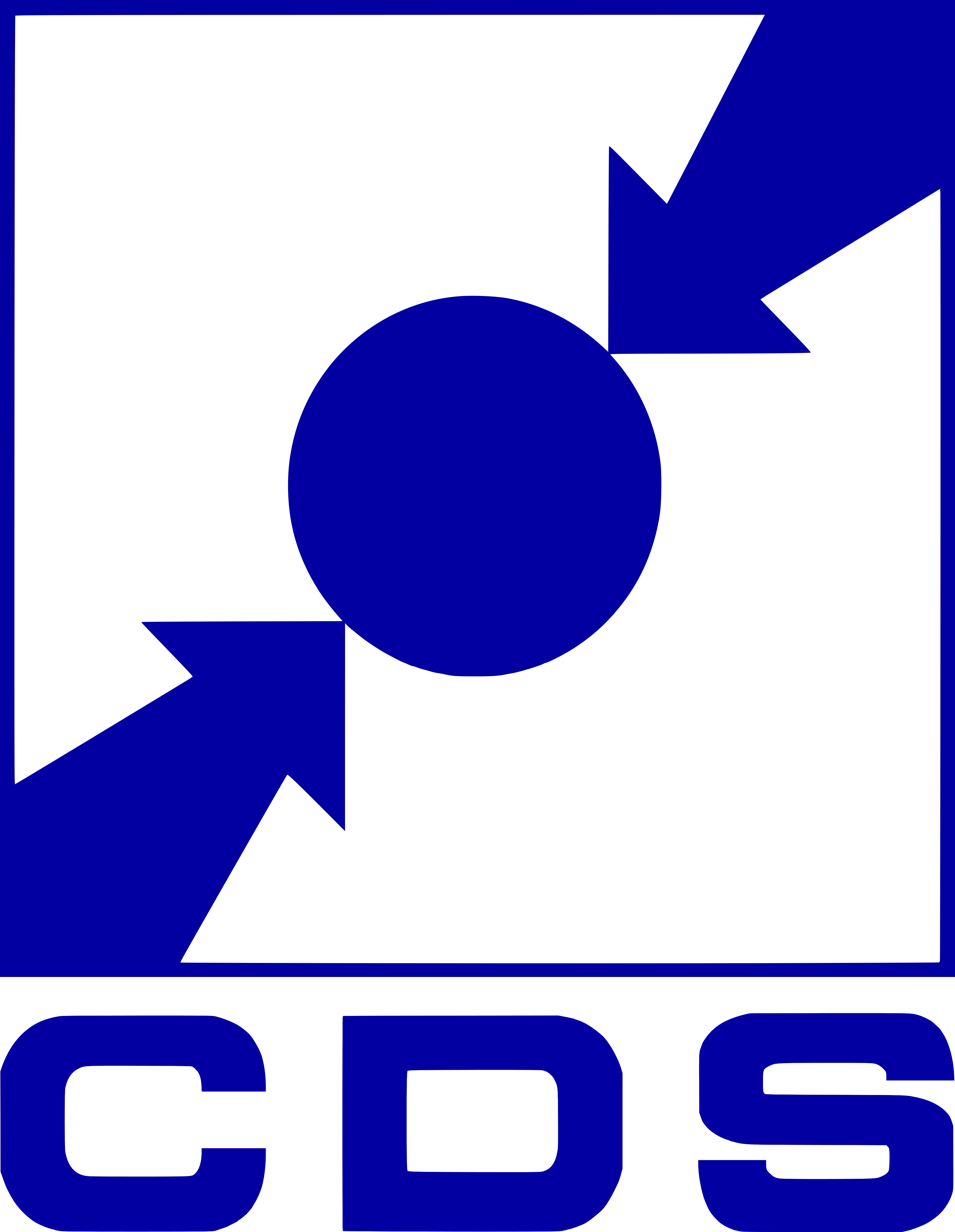
	First party	Second party	Third party
Leader	Mota Amaral	Jaime Gama	Américo Viveiros
Party	PSD	PS	CDS–PP
Seats won	27	14	2
Popular vote	59,114	36,049	8,291
Percentage	53.8%	32.8%	7.6%
- Map of Azores showing constituencies won
President before election
Altino Pinto de Magalhães
Independent
Elected President
Mota Amaral
PSD

The Azores Regional Election (1976) (Portuguese: Eleições legislativas regionais nos Açores, 1976) was an election held on 27 June 1976 for the first Legislative Assembly of the Portuguese Autonomous Region of the Azores.

Turnout was 67.51 percent (109,826 voted of the 162,677 registered participants), resulting in a victory of the Social Democratic Party led by Mota Amaral, who became the first President through election.

== Background ==
Until the 19th century the administration of the Azores had been separated from the national government, and considered overseas territories. After 1895, the Azores and Madeira obtained their own level of administrative autonomy that was established in the Portuguese Constitution. In this form the islands began to function as autonomous districts, similar to the district Juntas Gerais, which continued until 1974. But, in practice, these communities were abandoned administratively, and had no means to improve development, resulting in immigration. Following the Carnation Revolution, from April 1974 until August 1975, the Azores continued as autonomous districts, until the Junta Governativa dos Açores was constituted under President General Altino de Magalhães and six other councilmen:

- Dr. Henrique Aguiar Rodrigues (PPD), to handle Assuntos Sociais, Trabalho e Emigração (Social Issues, Work and Immigration);
- Dr. José Adriano Borges de Carvalho, (later substituted by Dr. Álvaro Monjardino) (PPD), as the coordinator of the Coordenação Económica e Finanças (Economic Coordination and Finances);
- José Pacheco de Almeida (PPD), to run Transportes, Comércio, Comunicações e Turismo (Transport, Commerce, Communication and Tourism);
- Eng. José António Martins Goulart (PS), in the role of Educação, Investigação Científica, Comunicação Social e Cultural (Education, Scientific Investigation, Social Communication and Culture);
- Engº Leonildo Garcia Vargas (PS), in Administração Local, Equipamento Social e Ambiente (Local Administration, Social Equipment and Environment);
- Dr. António de Albuquerque Jácome Corrêa, to administer Agricultura, Pescas e Indústria (Agriculture, Fishing and Industry)

The Junta Governantiva which was named on 22 August 1975 constituted a provisional government, that tried to respond to several of the post-Revolution problems, and to prepare a proposal for the first Politico-Administrative Statute for the Autonomous Region of the Azores.

== Political parties ==
- Democratic and Social Centre (CDS)
- Movement of Socialist Left (MES)
- Portuguese Communist Party (PCP)
- Communist Party of the Portuguese Workers (PCTP/MRPP)
- Socialist Party (PS)
- Social Democratic Party (PSD)

== Distribution of MPs by constituency ==
The following table contains the number of seats that each constituency can elect.

Constituency	Total MPs	Registered voters
Corvo	2	309
Faial	4	10,898
Flores	3	2,680
Graciosa	3	4,324
Pico	4	11,413
Santa Maria	3	4,766
São Jorge	4	7,711
São Miguel	13	80,364
Terceira	8	40,212
Total	43	162,677

== Summary of votes and seats ==
Summary of the 27 June 1976 Legislative Assembly of Azores elections results
Graph of the party split among 43 seats.
Parties	Votes	%	Seats	
Parties	Votes	%	1976	%
Social Democratic	59,114	53.83	27	62.79
Socialist	36,049	32.82	14	32.56
Democratic and Social Centre	8,291	7.55	2	4.65
Communist	2,387	2.17	0	0.00
Portuguese Workers' Communist	638	0.58	0	0.00
Movement of Socialist Left	167	0.15	0	0.00
Total valid	106,646	97.10	43	100.00
Blank ballots	1,304	1.19		
Invalid ballots	1,876	1.71		
Total	109,826	100.00		
Registered voters/turnout	162,677	67.51		
Source: Comissão Nacional de Eleições

== See also ==
- 1976 Madeiran regional election
