= Coalition PSD/CDS =

Coalition PSD/CDS Coligação PSD/CDS
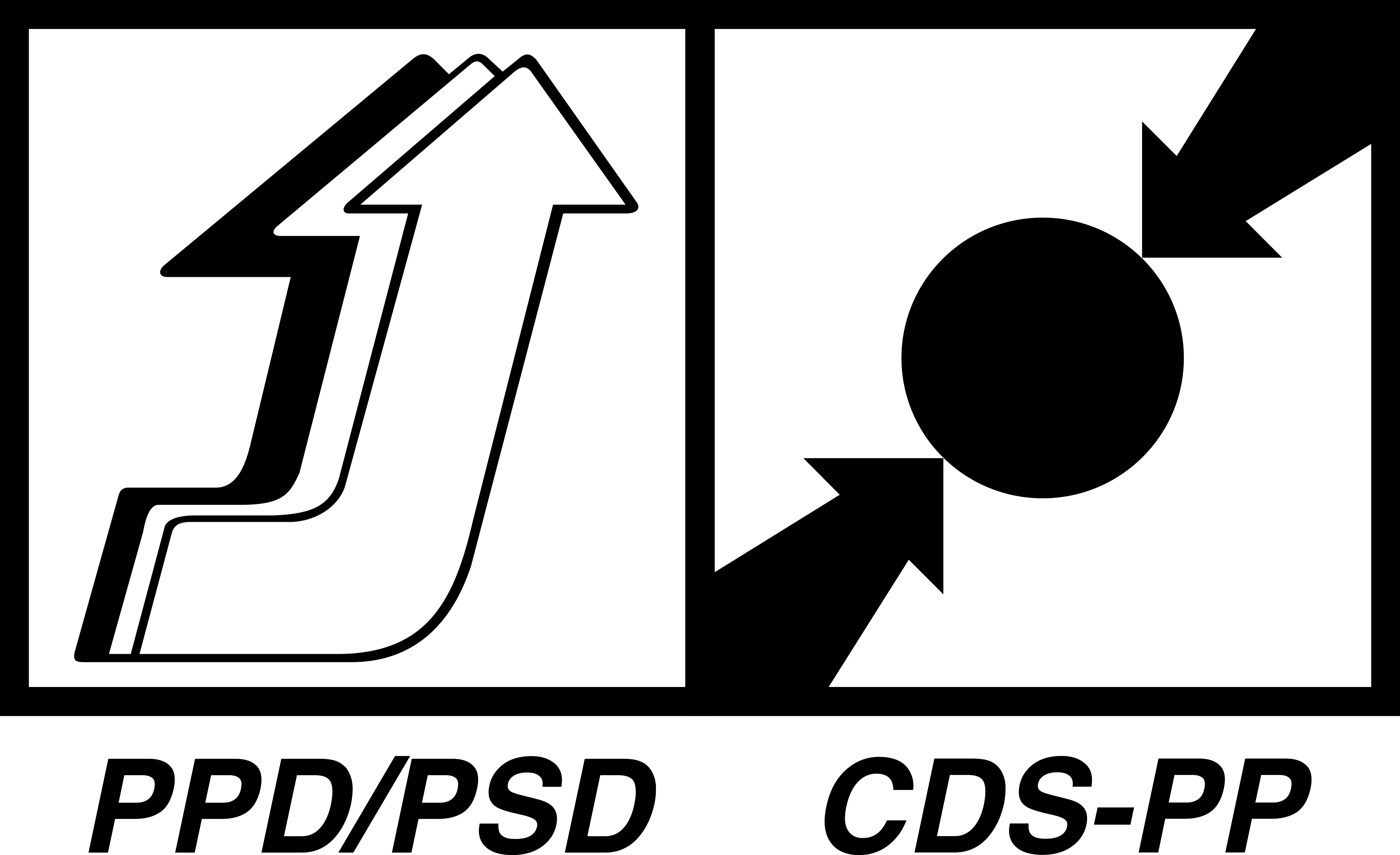
- Abbreviation: PPD/PSD.CDS-PP (official)
- Leader: Luís Montenegro; Nuno Melo
- Founded: 1997 (just the two parties) 1979 (Democratic Alliance along PPM)
- Ideology: Conservatism
- Political position: Centre-right to right-wing
- European affiliation: European People's Party
- European Parliament group: European People's Party
- International affiliation: Centrist Democrat International; International Democrat Union
- Member parties: Social Democratic Party; CDS – People's Party

The PSD/CDS coalition (Portuguese: Coligação PSD/CDS, PPD/PSD.CDS-PP) is a recurring conservative political and electoral alliance in Portugal formed by the Social Democratic Party (PPD/PSD) and CDS – People's Party (CDS-PP). The coalition is currently in government, under the name AD – PSD/CDS Coalition.

Though the history of coalition between the two parties stretches back over 40 years, the parties have not run together in most elections and, when they did so, they always retained their own autonomous parliamentary groups afterwards.

== History ==
PSD and CDS were founded after the 1974 Revolution that overthrew the Estado Novo dictatorship.

Both parties have had a close affinity for the most part of their existence. Previous to any electoral alliance, they both endorsed the same presidential candidate in the first democratic presidential election of 1976, Ramalho Eanes, who also had the backing of the Socialist Party.

The first time the two parties were together in a coalition was in the general and local elections of 1979, under the Democratic Alliance banner, albeit along with the People's Monarchist Party and the Reformers, a small group of Socialist Party dissidents. This first continuous coalition lasted until 1983 and run a total of two general elections (1979 and 1980) and two local elections (1979 and 1982). Both parties endorsed again a single candidate in the 1980 and 1986 presidential elections.

In Portugal, presidential elections aren't formally partisan, although all major parties usually endorse a candidate from their ranks. In the 1991 presidential elections, PSD backed incumbent Socialist President Mário Soares, while CDS endorsed its own former minister, Basílio Horta. Since 2001, both parties have always officially endorsed the same candidate (former PSD Prime Minister Aníbal Cavaco Silva in 2006 and 2011, and former PSD ministers Joaquim Ferreira do Amaral in 2001 and Marcelo Rebelo de Sousa in 2016 and 2021). The candidates supported by PSD and CDS have won four consecutive presidential elections, 2006, 2011, 2016 and 2021, until being defeated in 2026.

The coalition with just the two parties appeared formally for the first time in the 1997 local elections and, at the local level, it has been expanded to more municipalities in each following election till today (2001, 2005, 2009, 2013, 2017 and 2021), holding, as of 2021, 31 mayors out of 308 municipalities in the country.

The coalition was on the ballot in the 2004 Azores regional election, as Coalition Azores (Portuguese: Coligação Açores, CA), but failed to win that election. The coalition was also on the ballot in the 2023 Madeira regional election, as We are Madeira (Portuguese: Somos Madeira, SM). The coalition has been on the ballot in two European Parliament elections, 2004 as Forward Portugal (Portuguese: Força Portugal, FP), and 2014 as Portugal Alliance (Portuguese: Aliança Portugal, AP).

On elections for the Assembly of the Republic, the two-party coalition was tried for the first time in the 2015 legislative election, as Portugal Ahead (Portuguese: Portugal à Frente, PàF), and it polled ahead with almost 39% of the votes, but was unable to remain in power as it didn't gain enough seats for a majority.

Both parties ran again along with PPM as the Democratic Alliance for the 2024 European and general elections, except in Madeira's constituency in the general, where only PSD and CDS ran together as First Madeira. After a snap election was called for 18 May 2025, PPM left the AD coalition with PSD and CDS, with the new coalition being solely between PSD and CDS, named AD – PSD/CDS Coalition.

== Election results ==
=== Assembly of the Republic ===
==== 2015 legislative election ====
Logo of the Portugal Ahead (PáF) coalition.

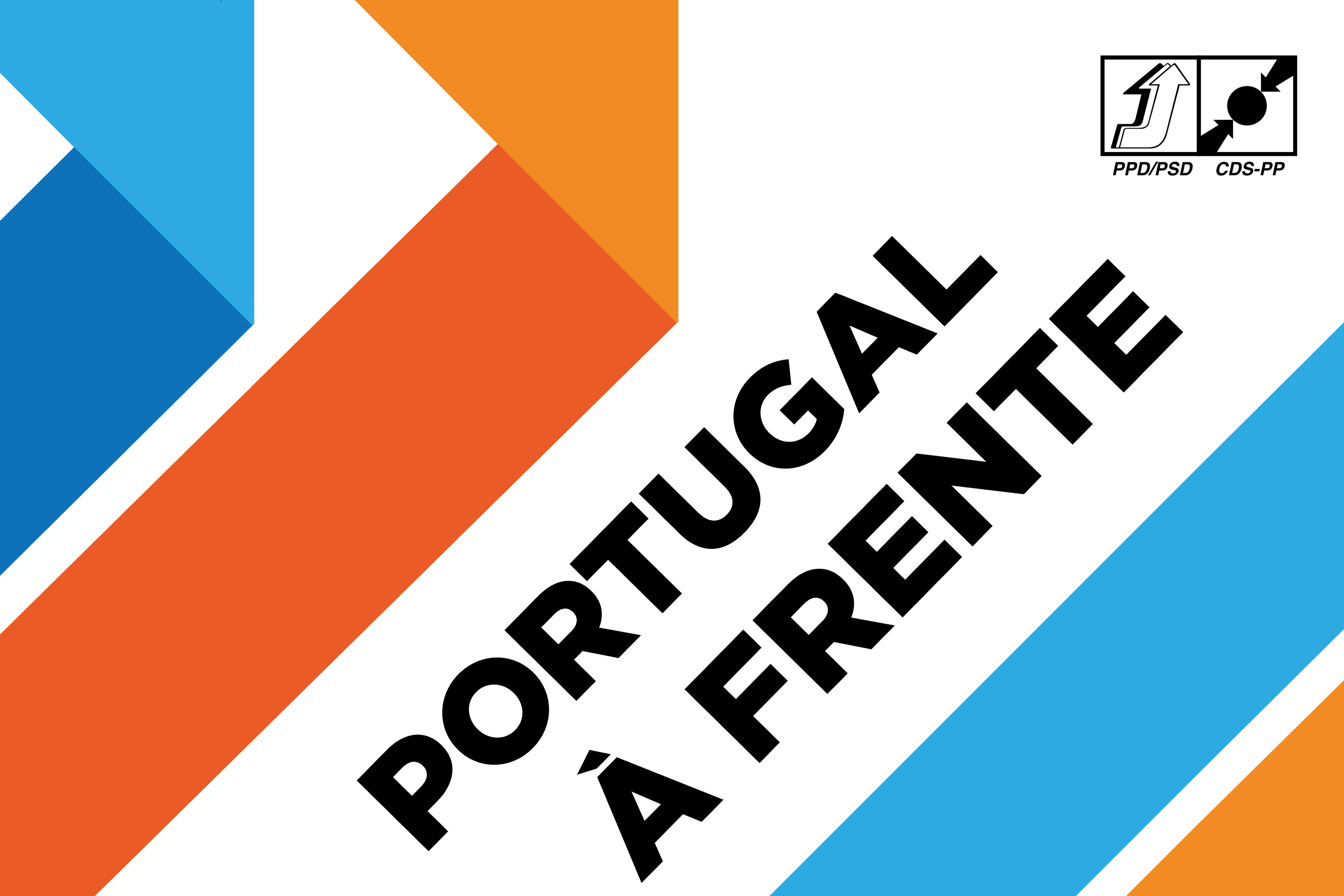
Flag of the Portugal Ahead (PáF) coalition.

For the 2015 legislative election, PSD and CDS-PP ran under a coalition with the name Portugal Ahead. In the legislative election on 5 October 2015, the PSD/CDS-PP joint list received 36.9% of the vote and returned 102 seats in the Assembly of the Republic, with the PSD electing 5 deputies on standalone lists in Madeira and Azores.

Although the coalition won the elections, and surprised many analysts and pundits, the left parties together had a majority in Parliament, and opted to negotiate a confidence-and-supply agreement, thus refusing to allow for a second PSD/CDS-PP cabinet. For the first time in Portuguese democracy the Socialist Party, the second most voted political force in the elections, negotiated with the BE, the PCP and the PEV a formation of a new government.

Following the fall of the short-lived 20th Constitutional Government, the "natural" extinction of the coalition was declared on 16 December 2015 by Passos Coelho: "No formal act is necessary to put an end to it".

Election	Coalition name	Leader	Votes	%	Seats	Government
2015	Portugal Ahead	Pedro Passos Coelho	2,085,465	38.6 (#1)	107 / 230	Coalition (Note: Minority government (2015); Opposition (2015–2019).)
2015	Portugal Ahead	Pedro Passos Coelho	2,085,465	38.6 (#1)	107 / 230	Opposition

==== After 2015 ====
After the Portugal Ahead coalition dissolution, both PSD and CDS contested a few constituencies in a joint coalition: In 2022, PSD and CDS ran in a joint coalition in Madeira called Madeira First, and in Azores both parties were joined with PPM in a coalition called Democratic Alliance. In 2024, the PSD, CDS and PPM ran in a joint coalition in all constituencies except Madeira, which repeated the PSD-CDS Madeira First coalition. After the departure of PPM from the 2024 Democratic Alliance, the PSD and CDS were the only parties in the coalition, renamed AD – PSD/CDS Coalition.

Election	Coalition name	Leader	Votes	%	Seats	Government
Nationwide coalitions
2024	Democratic Alliance (Note: The Democratic Alliance includes the People's Monarchist Party.)	Luís Montenegro	1,867,464	28.9 (#1)	80 / 230	Coalition (Note: Minority government)
2025	AD – PSD/CDS Coalition	Luís Montenegro	2,008,488	31.8 (#1)	91 / 230	Coalition
Coalitions in some districts
2022	All, in coalition and separately (Note: PSD and CDS ran in coalition in only two constituencies: Azores (along with PPM) and Madeira (just the two). Nationwide, PPM only ran by itself in one constituency, Madeira, where it got 260 votes. These isolated PPM votes are not taken into account because they are not related to PSD or CDS candidacies.)	Rui Rio	1,707,456	30.7 (#2)	77 / 230	Opposition
2022	Madeira First (Madeira)	Rui Rio	50,634	39.8 (#1)	3 / 6	Opposition
2022	Democratic Alliance (Azores)	Rui Rio	28,520	33.9 (#2)	2 / 5	Opposition
2024	Madeira First (Madeira)	Luís Montenegro	52,992	35.4 (#1)	3 / 6	Coalition

=== European Parliament ===
==== 2004 European Parliament election ====
As Forward Portugal (Força Portugal, FP)

Election	Leader	Votes	%	Seats
2004	João de Deus Pinheiro	1,132,769	33.3 (#2)	7 / 21

==== 2014 European Parliament election ====
An alliance was formed as the Portugal Alliance (Aliança Portugal) for the 2014 European Parliament election, in which the alliance won 27.7% of the popular vote and 7 of Portugal's 21 seats in the European Parliament, sitting with the European People's Party Group.

As Portugal Alliance (Aliança Portugal, AP)

Election	Leader	Votes	%	Seats
2014	Paulo Rangel	910,647	27.7 (#2)	7 / 21

=== Regional Assemblies ===
==== 2004 Azores regional election ====
As Azores Coalition (Coligação Açores, CA)

Election	Leader	Votes	%	Seats	Government
2004	Victor do Couto Cruz	38,883	36.8 (#2)	21 / 52	Opposition

==== 2023 Madeira regional election ====
As We are Madeira (Somos Madeira, SM)

Election	Leader	Votes	%	Seats	Government
2023	Miguel Albuquerque	58,394	43.1 (#1)	23 / 47	Coalition (Note: Coalition government Social Democratic Party-CDS–PP; Confidence & supply gov't: PSD/CDS-PP ⇐ (PAN).)

=== Local elections ===
Only in contests where PSD and CDS-PP ran in a joint coalition.

Election	Votes	%	Councillors	+/-	Mayors	+/-	Assemblies	+/-	Parishes	+/-
1997	124,859	2.3 (#6)	7 / 2,021	New	0 / 305	New	22 / 6,807	New	561 / 33,953	New
2001	472,581	9.0 (#4)	114 / 2,044	▲103	15 / 308	▲15	427 / 6,876	▲392	2,124 / 34,569	▲1,486
2005	462,199	8.6 (#4)	131 / 2,046	▲17	18 / 308	▲3	407 / 6,885	▼20	2,065 / 34,498	▼59
2009	540,053	9.8 (#3)	157 / 2,078	▲21	19 / 308	▲1	522 / 6,946	▲115	2,911 / 34,498	▲847
2013	379,110	7.6 (#4)	154 / 2,086	▼3	16 / 308	▼3	493 / 6,487	▼29	2,096 / 27,167	▼815
2017	454,222	8.8 (#4)	169 / 2,074	▲15	16 / 308	0	539 / 6,461	▲46	2,486 / 27,005	▲390
2021	540,783	10.8 (#3)	239 / 2,064	▲70	31 / 308	▲15	751 / 6,448	▲212	3,210 / 26,790	▲724
2025	749,568	13.6 (#2)	301 / 2,058	▲62	44 / 308	▲13	905 / 6,463	▲154	4,106 / 27,973	▲896

=== Presidential elections ===
The table below shows the electoral results of presidential candidates who were endorsed by both parties, besides endorsements by other parties.

Election	Candidate	1st round		2nd round	
Election	Candidate	Votes	%	Votes	%
1976	António Ramalho Eanes	2,967,414	61.5 (#1)	–	–
1980	António Soares Carneiro	2,319,847	40.2 (#2)	–	–
1986	Diogo Freitas do Amaral	2,628,178	46.3 (#1)	2,864,728	48.7 (#2)
2001	Joaquim Ferreira do Amaral	1,493,858	34.5 (#2)	–	–
2006	Aníbal Cavaco Silva	2,746,689	50.6 (#1)	–	–
2011	Aníbal Cavaco Silva	2,231,603	53.0 (#1)	–	–
2016	Marcelo Rebelo de Sousa	2,411,925	52.0 (#1)	–	–
2021	Marcelo Rebelo de Sousa	2,534,745	60.7 (#1)	–	–
2026	Luís Marques Mendes	637,394	11.3 (#5)	–	–

== Leaders ==
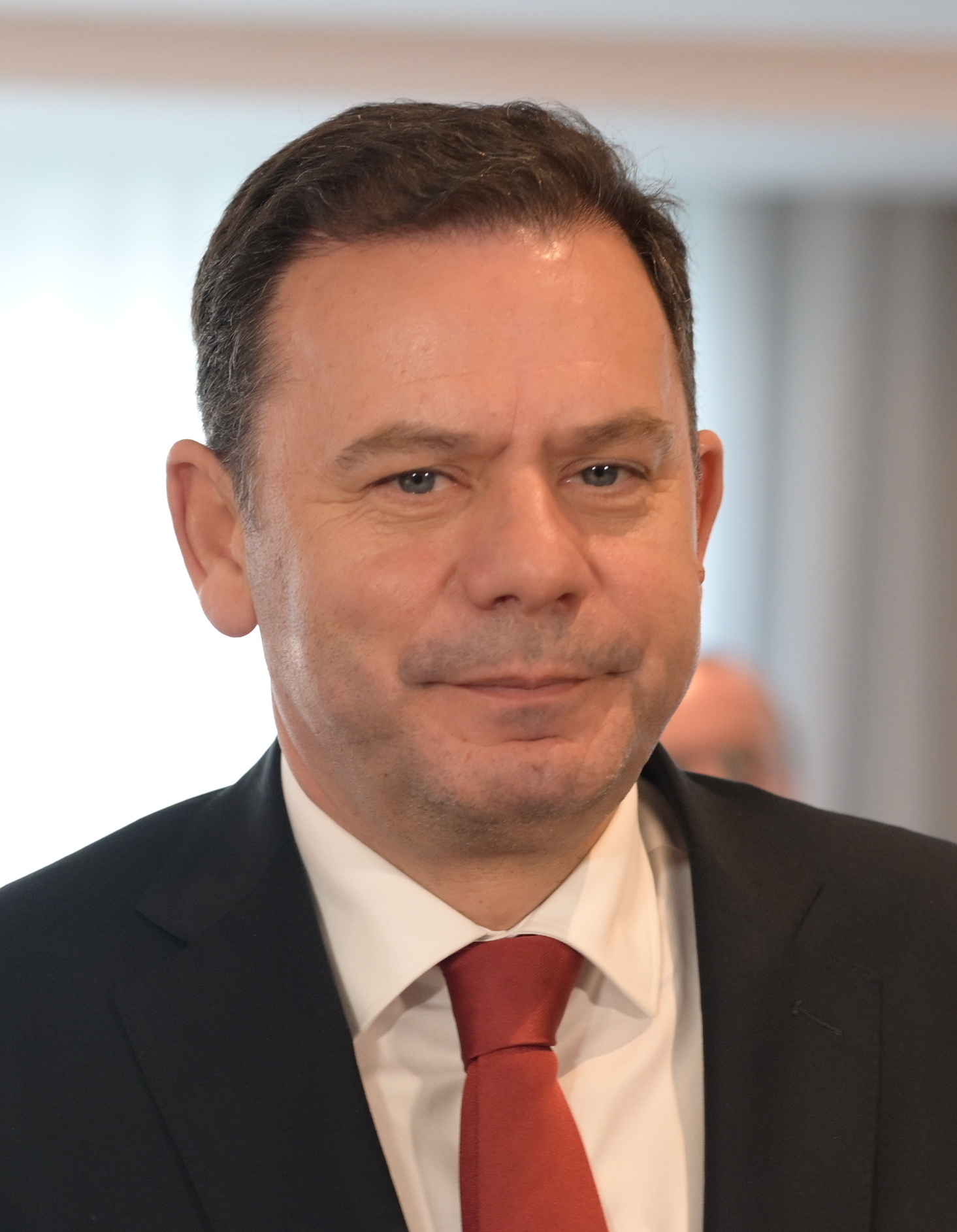
Luís Montenegro, Incumbent PSD leader.

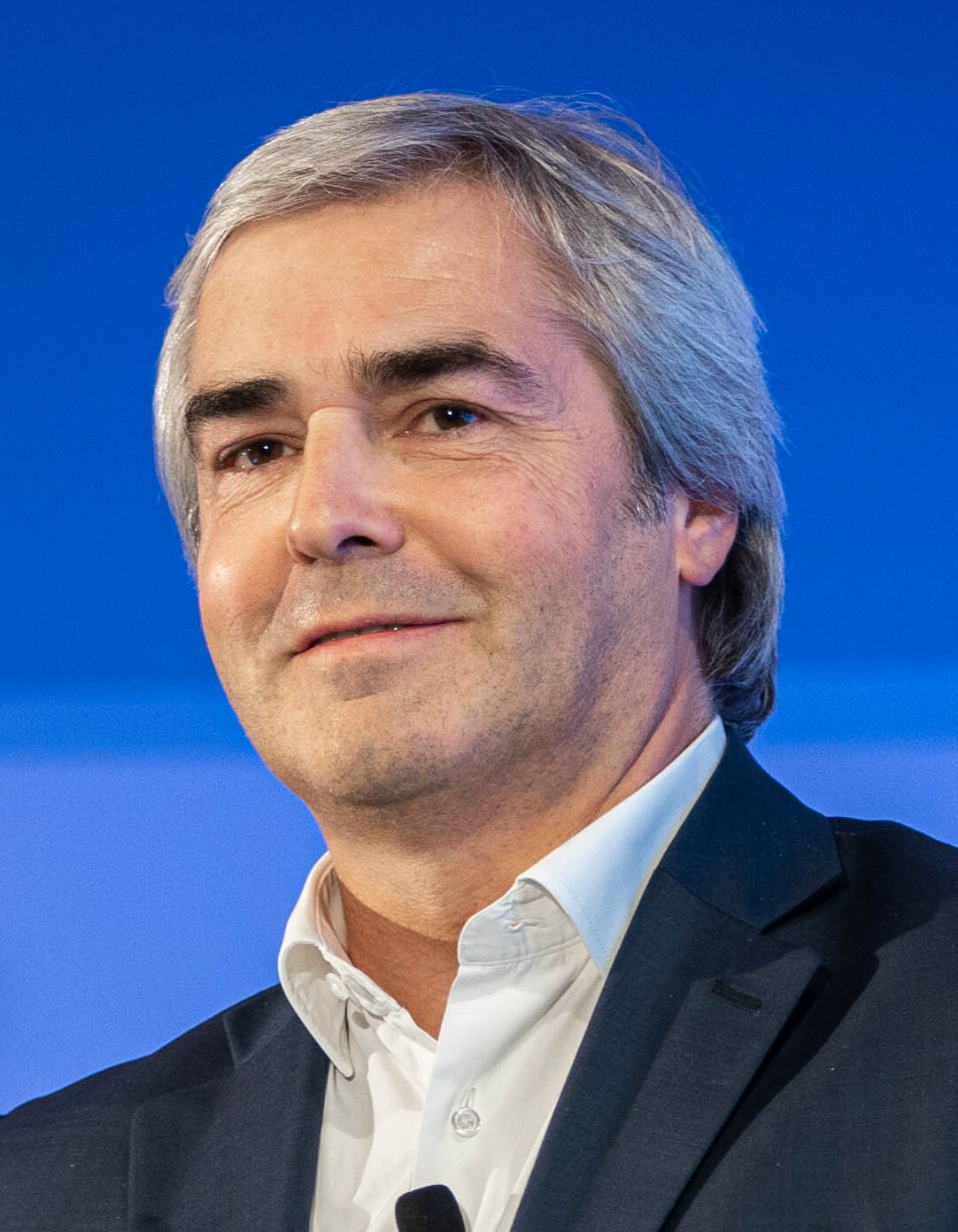
Nuno Melo, Incumbent CDS-PP leader.

Date (start of term)	PSD	CDS-PP
22 March 1992		Manuel Monteiro
29 March 1996	Marcelo Rebelo de Sousa	Manuel Monteiro
22 March 1998	Marcelo Rebelo de Sousa	Paulo Portas
1 May 1999	José Durão Barroso	Paulo Portas
30 June 2004	Pedro Santana Lopes	Paulo Portas
10 April 2005	Luís Marques Mendes	Paulo Portas
24 April 2005	Luís Marques Mendes	José Ribeiro e Castro
21 April 2007	Luís Marques Mendes	Paulo Portas
28 September 2007	Luís Filipe Menezes	Paulo Portas
31 May 2008	Manuela Ferreira Leite	Paulo Portas
26 March 2010	Pedro Passos Coelho	Paulo Portas
13 March 2016	Pedro Passos Coelho	Assunção Cristas
18 February 2018	Rui Rio	Assunção Cristas
25 January 2020	Rui Rio	Francisco Rodrigues dos Santos
2 April 2022	Rui Rio	Nuno Melo
3 July 2022	Luís Montenegro	Nuno Melo

== See also ==
- Democratic Alliance (Coalition PSD/CDS/PPM)
- Coalition PS/PCP
