= Democratic Party of the Atlantic =

Democratic Party of the Atlantic Partido Democrático do Atlântico
- Leader: Rui Matos
- Founded: 5 November 1979
- Dissolved: 1 September 2015
- Headquarters: Largo 2 de Março, 65; 9500–152 Ponta Delgada
- Membership: N/A
- Ideology: Populism; Devolutionism; Self-determination; Social Democracy
- Political position: Syncretic
- European affiliation: European Federalist Party
- Colours: Blue

Website
- www.pda.com.pt

The Democratic Party of the Atlantic (Portuguese: Partido Democrático do Atlântico, Portuguese pronunciation: [pɐɾˈtiðu ðɨmuˈkɾatiku ðu ɐˈtlɐ̃tiku]) was a political party, based in the Portuguese archipelago of the Azores. A regional party, whose electorate was concentrated on the islands of São Miguel, it was created by former supporters of the New State. it seldom obtained more than 1% of the votes in regional or national elections (even within the Azores).

== History ==
The party had its origin in the Movimento para a Autodeterminação do Povo Açoriano (MAPA) (Self-determination Movement for the Azorean People) founded in 1979 by Francisco da Costa Matos. The Movement and, later the PDA, promoted a form of home rule for the Azores, following the example of the Bermudas. While registered with the Supremo Tribunal de Justiça (Supreme Court) on 5 November 1979 as the União Democrática do Atlântico (Democratic Union of the Atlantic), it had changed its name to the PDA by the 1983 election.

In the Regional legislative election in the Azores held in 2004 the PDA got 284 votes.

It first presented a list of candidates for the national assembly elections on 20 February 2005, but only received 0.35% (1618 votes) for the Azores.

Although initially perceived as a far-right party, the party claimed to be as a right-of-centre party. It supported Socialist Manuel Alegre when he ran as an independent in the Portuguese presidential election of 2006 and, again, in 2011.

During the 2008 regional elections, the party ran a campaign that included the support for a mandatory local history discipline in the regions curriculum. Visiting the district school in Ribeira Grande, party leader José Ventura, indicated proposals to extend history in school, and evaluate students. As he indicated, "the student who is diligent and disciplined, of course, at the end of the school year must have learned something", referring to situations in the local educational system, that permitted some students advancing without a comprehensive understanding. On the 19 October 2008 vote, the party received 0.8% (627) of the votes.

In the Regional legislative election in the Azores held in 2012 the PDA got 530 votes.

During the 2011 Portuguese legislative elections, the party candidates included representatives of the Movimento Partido do Norte (Movement of the North Party), led by ex-PS deputy Pedro Batista, whose party competed in various constituencies, including Aveiro, Braga, Bragança, Porto, Guarda, Viana do Castelo and Vila Real, addition to the Azores.

The party's registration was cancelled by the Constitutional Court of Portugal on 1 September 2015, after the party failed to submit its required annual report in 2011, 2012, and 2013.

== Party leaders ==
- Teodoro de Sousa Pedro (1979-1982)
- Emanuel Chichorro de Medeiros (1982–1985)
- Clemente de Vasconcelos (1985-1988)
- Álvaro Teves Franco de Lemos (1988-1990)
- Carlos Eduardo da Silva de Melo Bento (1990-1996)
- Luís Francisco Netto de Viveiros (May–November 1996)
- João Gago da Câmara (1996-1999)
- Joaquim de Aguiar Cabral (1999-2002)
- José Francisco Nunes Ventura (2002-2010)
- Manuel Costa (2010-2012)
- Rui Matos (2012-2015)
