= Legislative Assembly of the Azores =

Legislature of the Azores in Portugal

Legislative Assembly of the Autonomous Region of the Azores Assembleia Legislativa da Região Autónoma dos Açores
- XIII Legislature

Type
- Type: Unicameral Regional Parliament

Leadership
- President: Luís Garcia, PPD/PSD since 16 November 2020
- Vice-President: João Vasco Costa, PS since 16 November 2020
- Vice-President: Catarina Cabeceiras, CDS–PP since 16 November 2020

Structure
- Seats: 57
- Political groups: Government (26): PSD/CDS/PPM: PPD/PSD (23); CDS–PP (2); PPM (1); Opposition (31): PS (23); CH (5); IL (1); PAN (1); BE (1)
- Length of term: Up to 4 years

Elections
- Voting system: Party-list proportional representation D'Hondt method
- Last election: 4 February 2024
- Next election: On or before October 2028

Meeting place
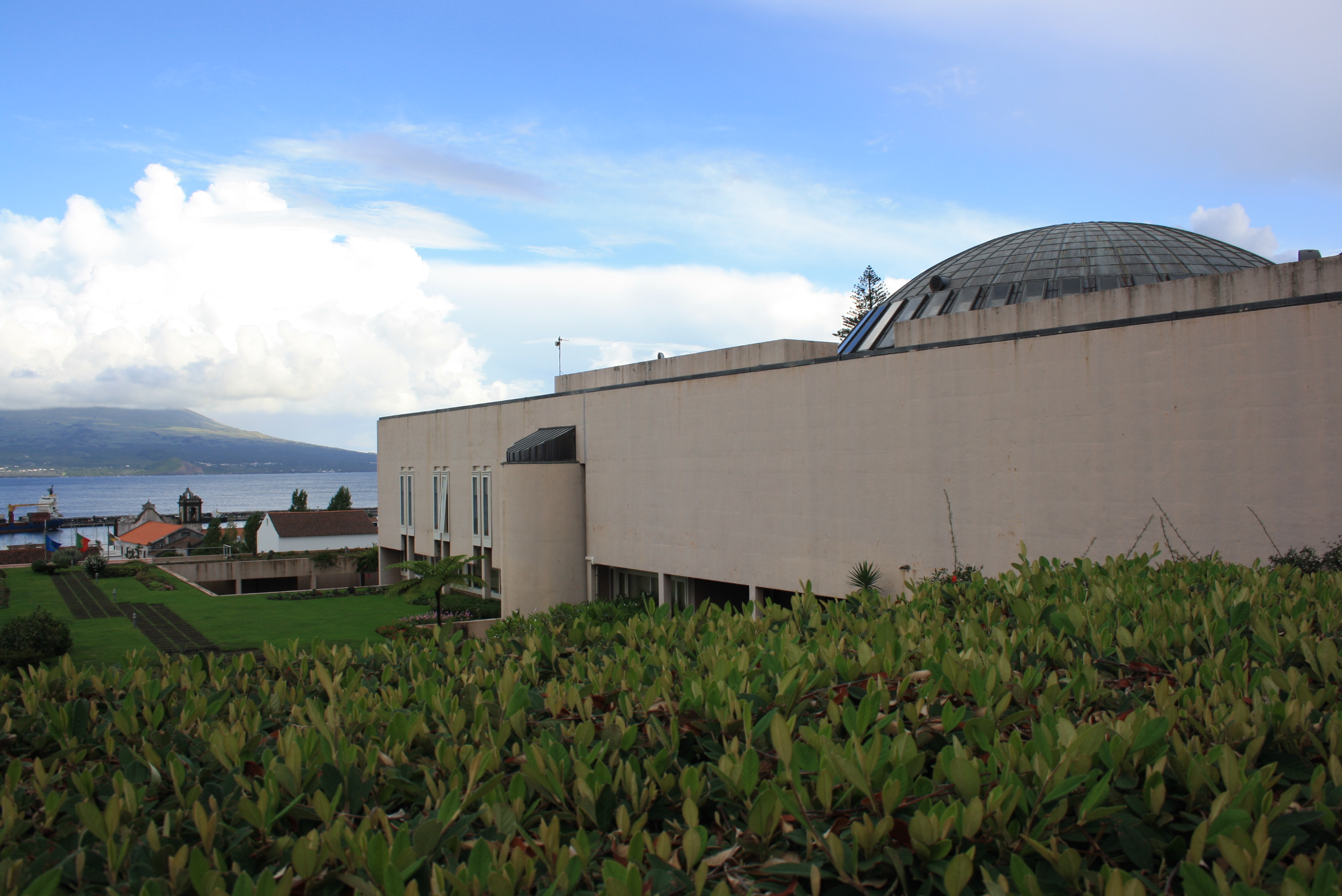
- Legislative Assembly of the Azores, Horta

Website
- http://www.alra.pt/

The Legislative Assembly of the Azores (Portuguese: Assembleia Legislativa dos Açores) is the regional assembly/legislature of the Azores, an autonomous region of Portugal.

== History ==
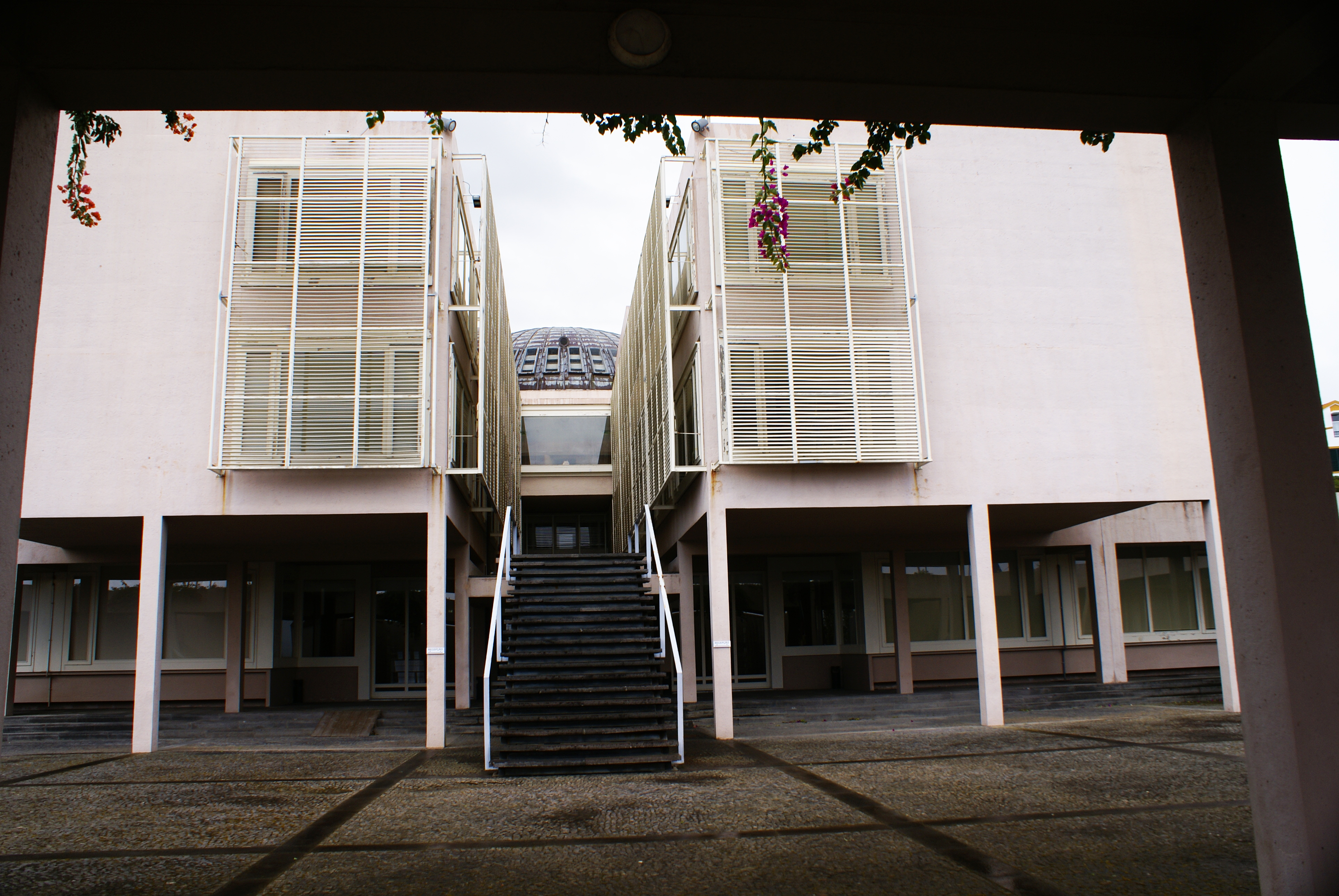
The main entrance inside the passageway to the grounds, showing the dome and grand staircase

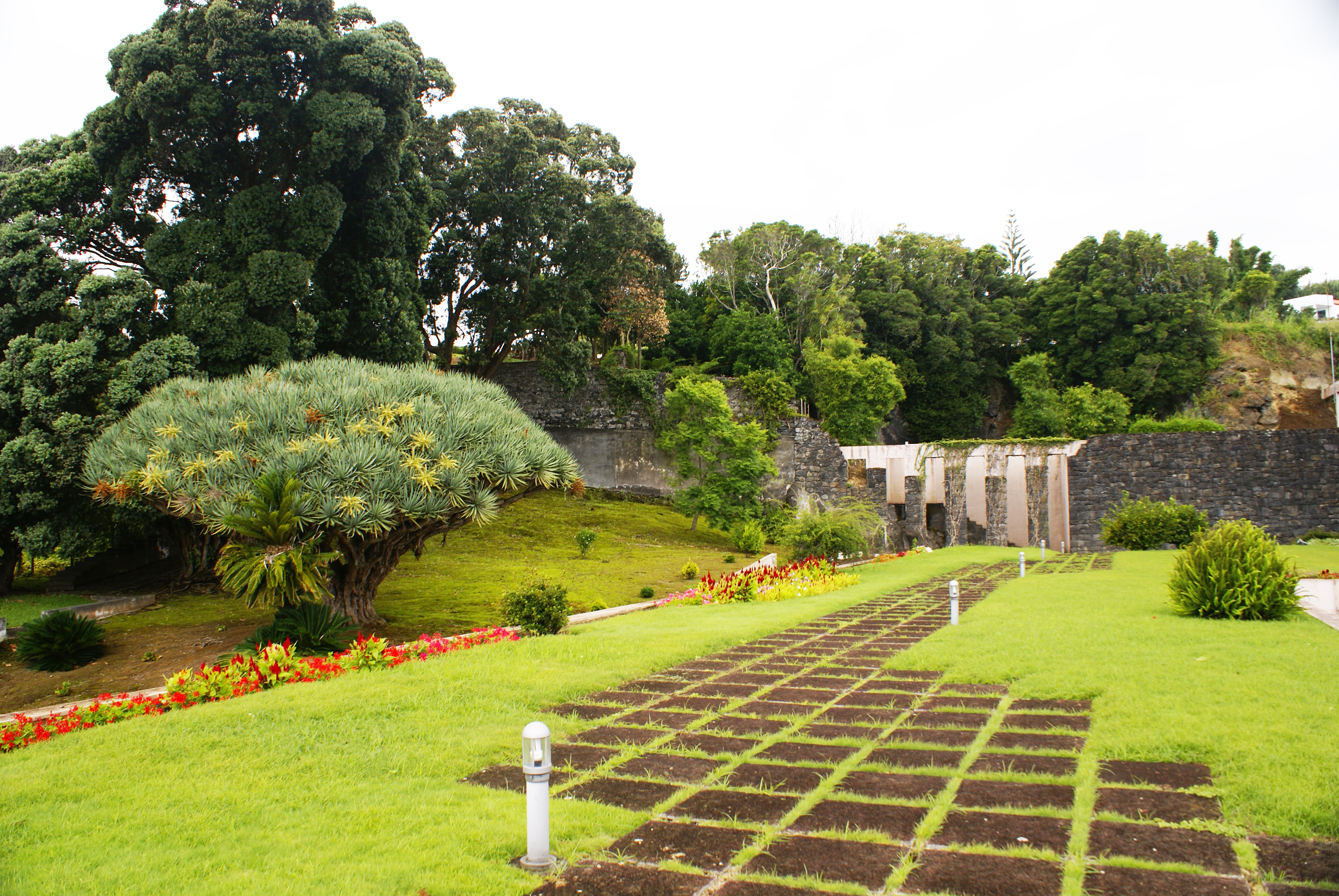
The manicured gardens within the grounds of the Assembleia Legislativa

The regional legislative assembly, since it was first instituted, has maintained its seat in the city of Horta. Initially, it was installed in the building of the masonic temple of the Sociedade Amor da Pátria, from 1976 until 1979, when it was moved to the Casa do Relógio in the old German quarters' Colónia Alemã. Neither of these buildings were sufficiently adequate for the running of the bureaucracy of the regional government, requiring the construction of a new edifice for the Azorean parliament.

A commission was established to investigate the requirements and location for a new building (a terrain overlooking an area with view of the islands of the central group of islands). Consequently, the commission resolved, on 4 June 1981, to initiate the process to construct the new building. In 1982, a public tender "for ideas", was initiated, resulting in 63 registered entrants, and 56 acceptable candidates (23 January 1983). This number was weeded down to 27 proposals, which were analyzed by a board of 10 members. The jurists included: representatives from the Regional Assembly; Regional Directorate for Habitation, Urbanism and Environment; Municipal Council of Horta; Regional Directorate for Culture; National Association of Portuguese Architects; and Order of Engineers.

In second round of study resulted in five candidates, that included architects Adalberto da Rocha Gonçalves Dias, Eduardo Mário Vale Mendes Carqueijeiro; José Gomes Fernandes; Luís Alexandre Ferreira Chaves and Manuel Correia Fernandes. Between 23 and 26 January 1984, the jury awarded the first prize to the team coordinated by Manuel Correia Fernandes, who were assisted by the firm Teixeira Duarte - Engenharia e Construções, SA (winner of the construction tender). The project was begun on 21 March 1988, and ran for two years: it was inaugurated on 15 July 1990.

The solemn ceremony commemorating the inauguration was presided by the Chief of State, Dr. Mário Soares, and included various figures from Portuguese society. The benediction, by bishop of Angra, Aurélio Granada Escudeiro, which was held in the plenary hall included the participation of the regional deputies, the principal civil, military and eclessiatical authorities, and other invited guests. There were speeches by Paul Valadão (PCP), Rui Meireles (CDS), Martins Goulart (PS) and Madruga da Costa (PSD), who followed the formal introductions by the President of the Assembly Reis Leite, President of the National Assembly, Vítor Crespo, and finally, President Mário Soares.

On 13 August 1992, the zone around the assembly was classified as an "area for the defense and urban control of the classified property", under regulating decree 17/92/A.

== Architecture ==
The legislature is a contemporary structure, constructed specifically for the functioning of the regional assembly, by project architect Manuel Correia Fernandes, and inaugurated in June 1990. Its minimalist design includes a space for plenary sessions of the assembly in the centre block, which is illuminated by a large dome visible from the exterior.

== Regional elections ==
- 1976
- 1980
- 1984
- 1988
- 1992
- 1996
- 2000
- 2004
- 2008
- 2012
- 2016
- 2020
- 2024

== Elected Composition of the Legislative Assembly of the Azores since 1976 ==
Legislatures since 1976
BE / PCP / PS / PAN / PPD/PSD / IL / CDS–PP / PPM / CH
| 1976 | 14 / 27 / 2 |
| 1980 | 12 / 30 / 1 |
| 1984 | 1 / 13 / 28 / 2 |
| 1988 | 1 / 22 / 26 / 2 |
| 1992 | 1 / 21 / 28 / 1 |
| 1996 | 1 / 24 / 24 / 3 |
| 2000 | 2 / 30 / 18 / 2 |
| 2004 | 31 / 19 / 2 |
| 2008 | 2 / 1 / 30 / 18 / 5 / 1 |
| 2012 | 1 / 1 / 31 / 20 / 3 / 1 |
| 2016 | 2 / 1 / 30 / 19 / 4 / 1 |
| 2020 | 2 / 25 / 1 / 21 / 1 / 3 / 2 / 2 |
| 2024 | 1 / 23 / 1 / 23 / 1 / 2 / 1 / 5 |

== See also ==
- List of presidents of the Legislative Assembly of the Azores
- Legislative Assembly of Madeira
