= Carlos César =

Portuguese politician (born 1956)

His Excellency Carlos César GCC CS
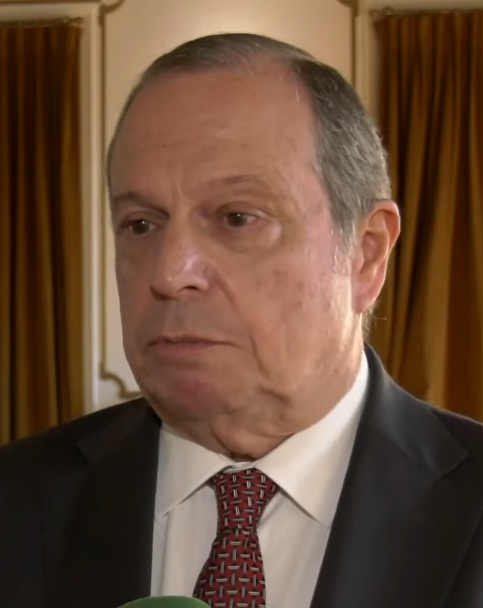
- César in 2023

President of the Socialist Party
- Incumbent
- Assumed office 29 November 2014
- Secretary-General: António Costa; Pedro Nuno Santos; Himself (acting); José Luís Carneiro
- Preceded by: Maria de Belém Roseira

President of the Regional Government of the Azores
- In office 9 November 1996 – 6 November 2012
- Representative: Mário Pinto; Alberto Sampaio da Nóvoa; Álvaro Laborinho Lúcio; José António Mesquita; Pedro Catarino
- Preceded by: Alberto Madruga da Costa
- Succeeded by: Vasco Cordeiro
Other offices
Secretary-General of the Socialist Party
Acting; 24 May 2025 – 28 June 2025
President	Himself
Preceded by	Pedro Nuno Santos
Succeeded by	José Luís Carneiro
Leader of the Opposition
Acting; 24 May 2025 – 3 June 2025
Prime Minister	Luís Montenegro
Preceded by	Pedro Nuno Santos
Succeeded by	André Ventura
Member of the Assembly of the Republic
In office 23 October 2015 – 24 October 2019
Constituency	Azores
In office 13 August 1987 – 3 November 1991
Constituency	Azores
Member of the Legislative Assembly of the Azores
In office 9 November 1996 – 6 November 2012
In office 5 October 1980 – 12 August 1987

Personal details
- Born: Carlos Manuel Martins do Vale César; 30 October 1956 (age 69) Ponta Delgada, Azores, Portugal
- Party: Socialist Party
- Spouse: Luísa César (m. 1977)
- Children: Francisco César
- Education: University of Lisbon (did not graduate)
- Awards: Ordem Militar de Cristo (2013)

Carlos Manuel Martins do Vale César, GCC (born 30 October 1956) is a Portuguese politician and former President of the Regional Government of the Portuguese autonomous region of the Azores. He currently serves as member of the Assembly of the Republic, member of the Council of State and President of the Socialist Party.

== Early life ==
He was born at Ponta Delgada into a family with republican and democratic traditions and a history of participatory activism. His grand-uncle Manuel Augusto César was a social activist during the Portuguese First Republic, who edited the newspapers O Proletário, the weekly Federação Operária, the Protesto (the publication of the Centro Socialista Antero de Quental) and Protesto do Povo (another socialist publication).

== Career ==
His civic knowledge, following the Carnation Revolution, was profoundly shaped by his brother Horácio do Vale César (also a journalist), and many of the socialist figures of the period, including Jaime Gama, Mário Mesquita and Medeiros Ferreira (all students of the school Liceu Nacional Antero de Quental).

He began public life in the opposition to the Estado Novo, in the last years of the regime, becoming a member of the Cooperativa Cultural Sextante, which was extinct by the National Assembly, in December 1972. In 1973, at 17 years of age, he became a member of the Comissão Dinamizadora da Comissão Democrática Eleitoral, in Ponta Delgada. On April 26, 1974 he founded the Associação de Estudantes do Liceu Antero de Quental (Antero Quental Students' Association) and, a month later, the Juventude Socialista (Socialist Youth) of the Azores. He was a member of the first Secretariat elected to the Socialist Party (PS) in Ponta Delgada, and was part of the delegation from the Azores in the First National Congress of the PS, participating in the party youth-wing, the Juventude Socialista (JS).

In 1975, he entered the Faculty of Law at the University of Lisbon, although he did not complete his licenciatura. During his period of studies, he also became involved in the Direcção da Associação Académica da Faculdade de Direito (Directorate of the Law Faculty's Academic Association). While in Lisbon he worked as administrative coordinator in a local cooperative responsible for documentation and culture. During this time he continued as the national leader of the JS (to this day he retains a national honorary status in the organization). He was an adjunct to the Secretary of State for Public Administration during the II Constitutional Government.

His political career did not slow down, when he returned to the Azores: in January 1981 he entered the Azorean Legislative Assembly at the age of 26. Shortly after, he became involved in the Direcção do Grupo Parlamentar (Directorate of the Parliamentary Group) of the PS, as well as various parliamentary commissions, as well as presiding over the commission on Economic Affairs. Between 1983 and 1985, he was elected as Regional Legislative Assembly's Vice-President, and took on the Presidency of PS Azores. He returned to national politics between 1987 and 1989, as a representative in the Assembly of the Republic, in the António Guterres government. Once again returning to the Azores, he became a member of the Municipal Assembly of Ponta Delgada, as well as the President of the Civil Parish of Fajã de Baixo. On 30 October 1994 (his 38th birthday) he was made the Presidente of the PS Azores, with 92% of the votes.

=== Presidency of the Azores ===
In 1996, he won the elections for the Regional Legislative Assembly of the Azores, by a narrow margin, winning 46% of the votes cast. The PS, under his leadership, would contest the regional legislative elections in 2000, 2004 and 2008.

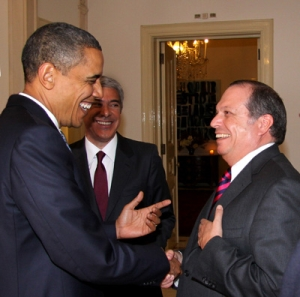
Barack Obama (left) meets Carlos César (right) during a visit to the Azores on November 19–20, 2010. In the background is the former Prime Minister of Portugal José Sócrates.

Although these victories brought cohesion and stability, they also brought stresses associated with internal change. Under Cesar the Political statute of the Azores was changed to limit the number of successive mandate's occupied by the president, resulting in his announcement (in 2008) not to run as his party's candidate for the 2012 elections. This was a bit of a controversy, as it was unclear at the time that Carlos César would break his own promise not run again. Vasco Cordeiro was eventually chosen as his party's successor, inline with the politics established in César's leadership. The two other candidates for the position, José Contente and Sérgio Ávila, were possible successors, but easily abandoned by the PS: Contente was a recognized apparatchik of the party and about the same age as César, while Ávila was point-man in the Vice-Presidency (responsible for regional finances) and a Terceirense, which hurt his chances of succeeding on the vote-rich island of São Miguel, where the PSD leader and mayor of Ponta Delgada (Berta Cabral) could easily obtain an advantage.

=== Post-Azores ===
Carlos César has been elected member of the Assembly of the Republic in the 2015 election, therefore returning to the Parliament where he has been between 1987 and 1991.

He is one of the five personalities elected by the Assembly of the Republic to the Council of State on 18 December 2015, and he took office on 12 January 2016.

== Honours ==
- Grand-Cross of the Order of Christ, Portugal (February 19, 2013)

== Personal life ==
César is married to Luísa Maria Assis Vital Gomes do Vale César. Their son is the politician Francisco César.

Political offices
Preceded by Maria de Belém Roseira	President of the Socialist Party; 2014-present	Incumbent
Preceded by Alberto Madruga da Costa	President of the Regional Government of the Azores; 1996–2012	Succeeded by Vasco Cordeiro
