= Next Azorean regional election =

- No later than 22 October 2028

57 seats to the Legislative Assembly of the Azores 29 seats needed for a majority
- Opinion polls
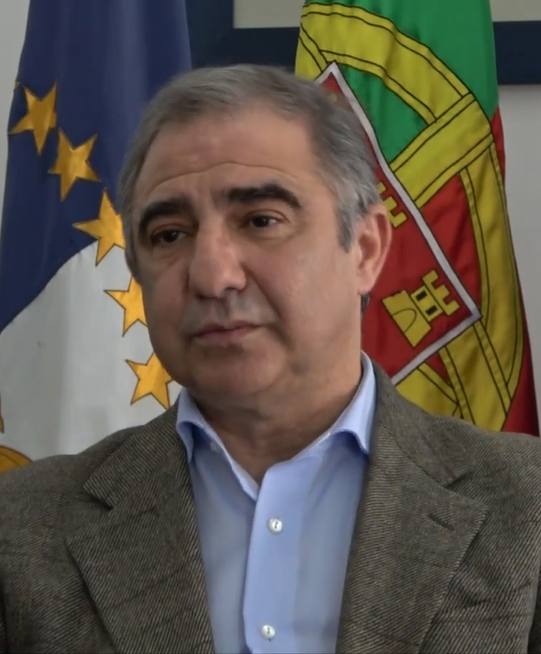

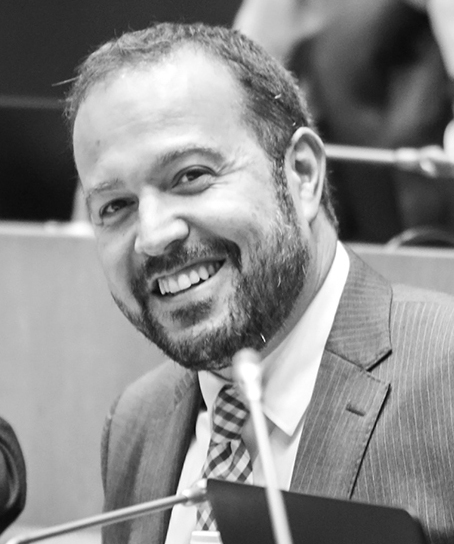

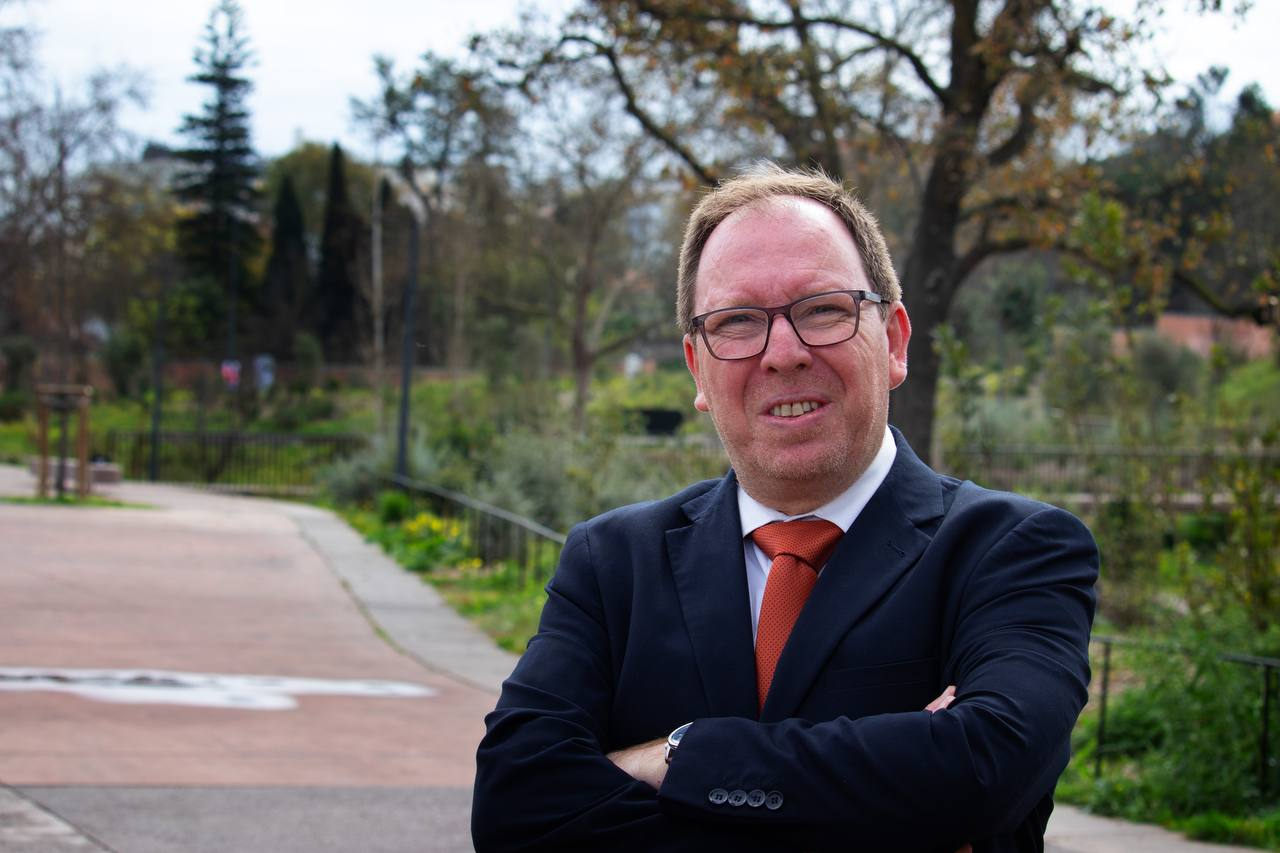

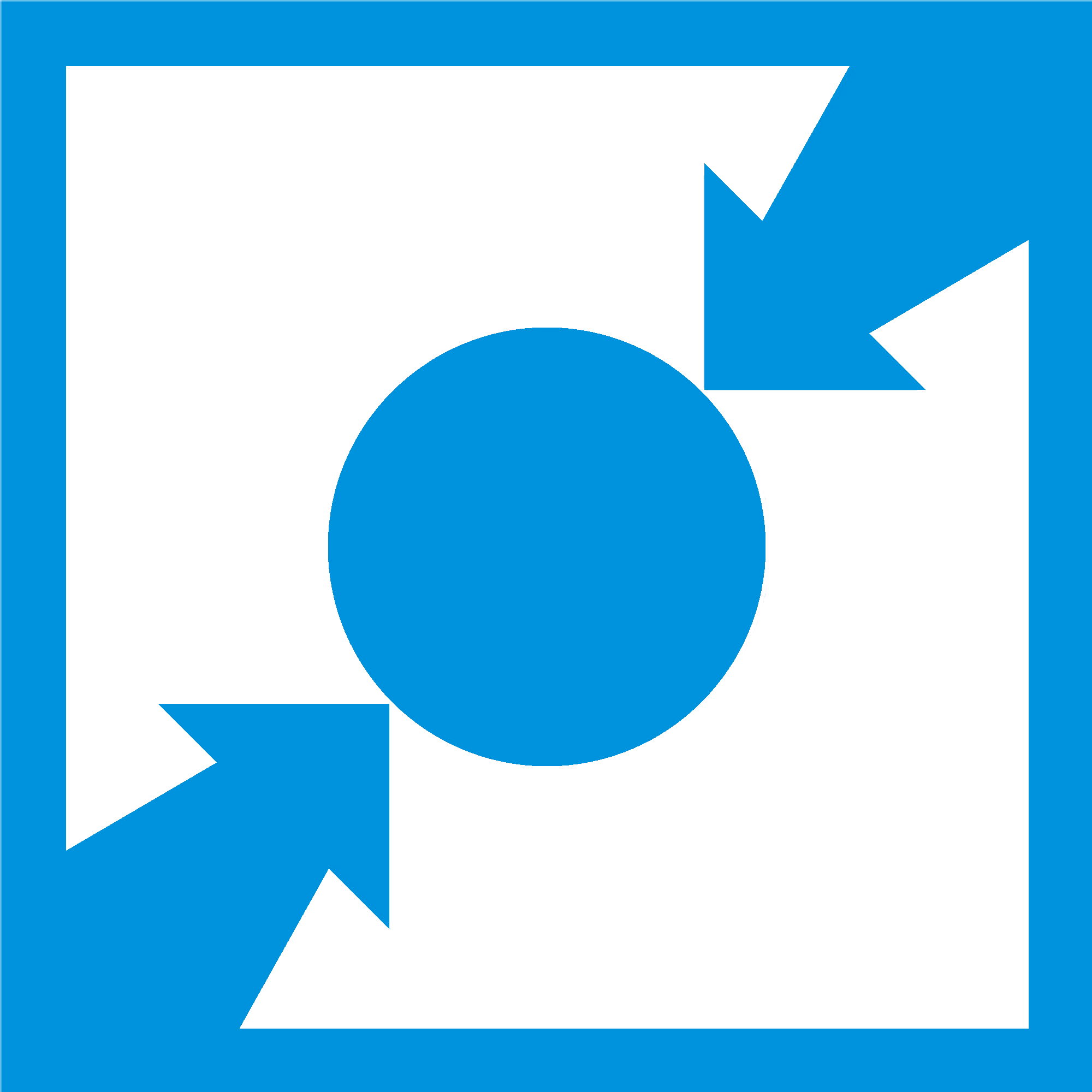

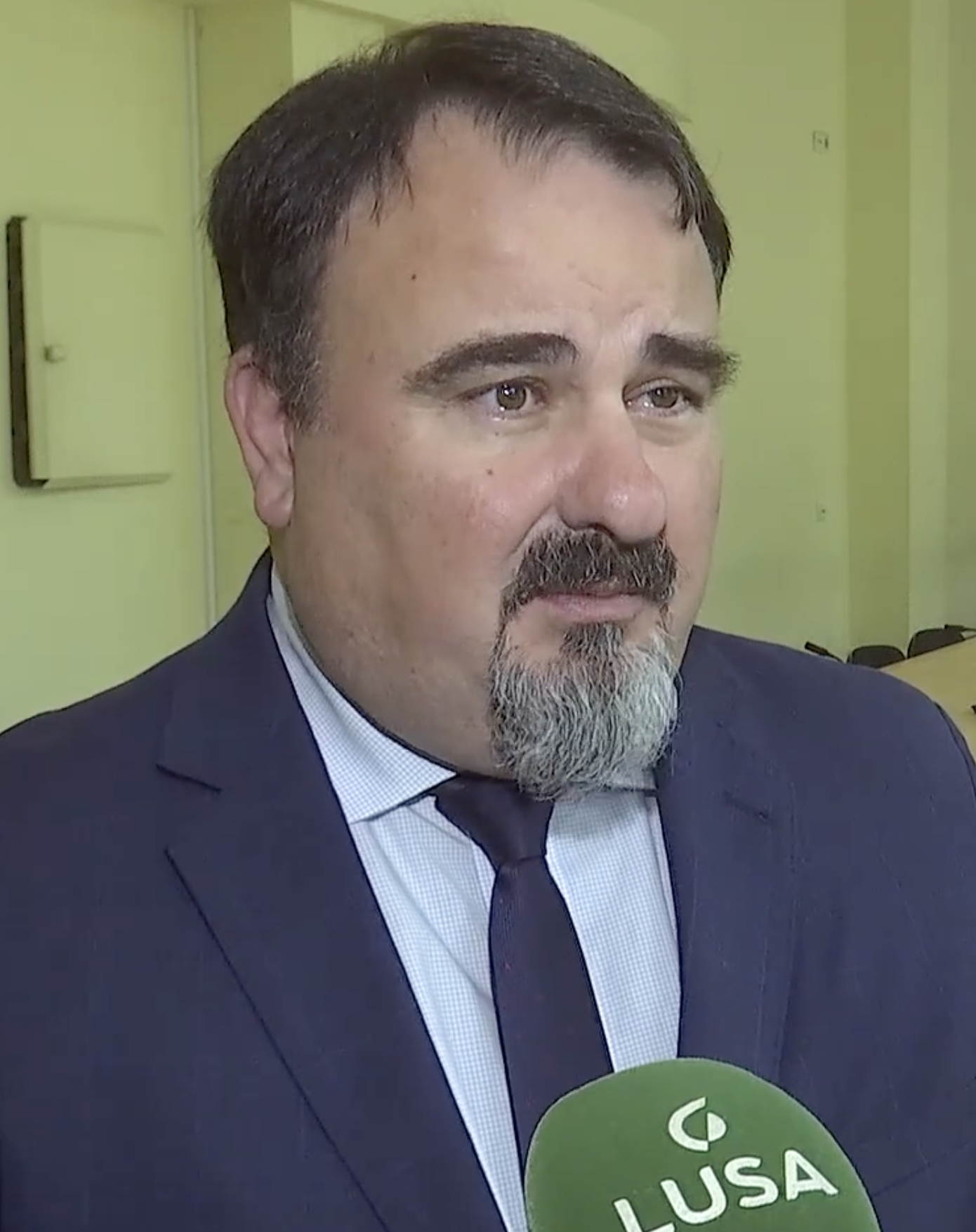

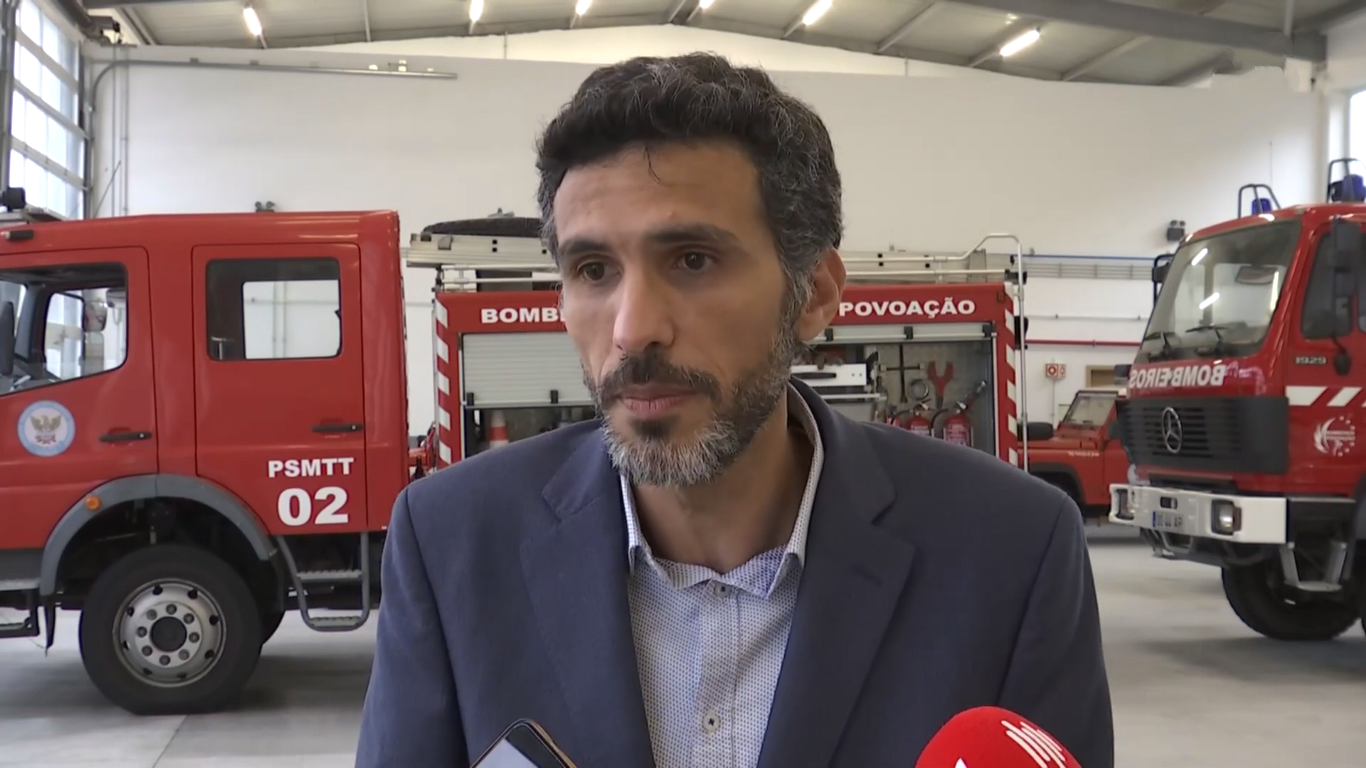

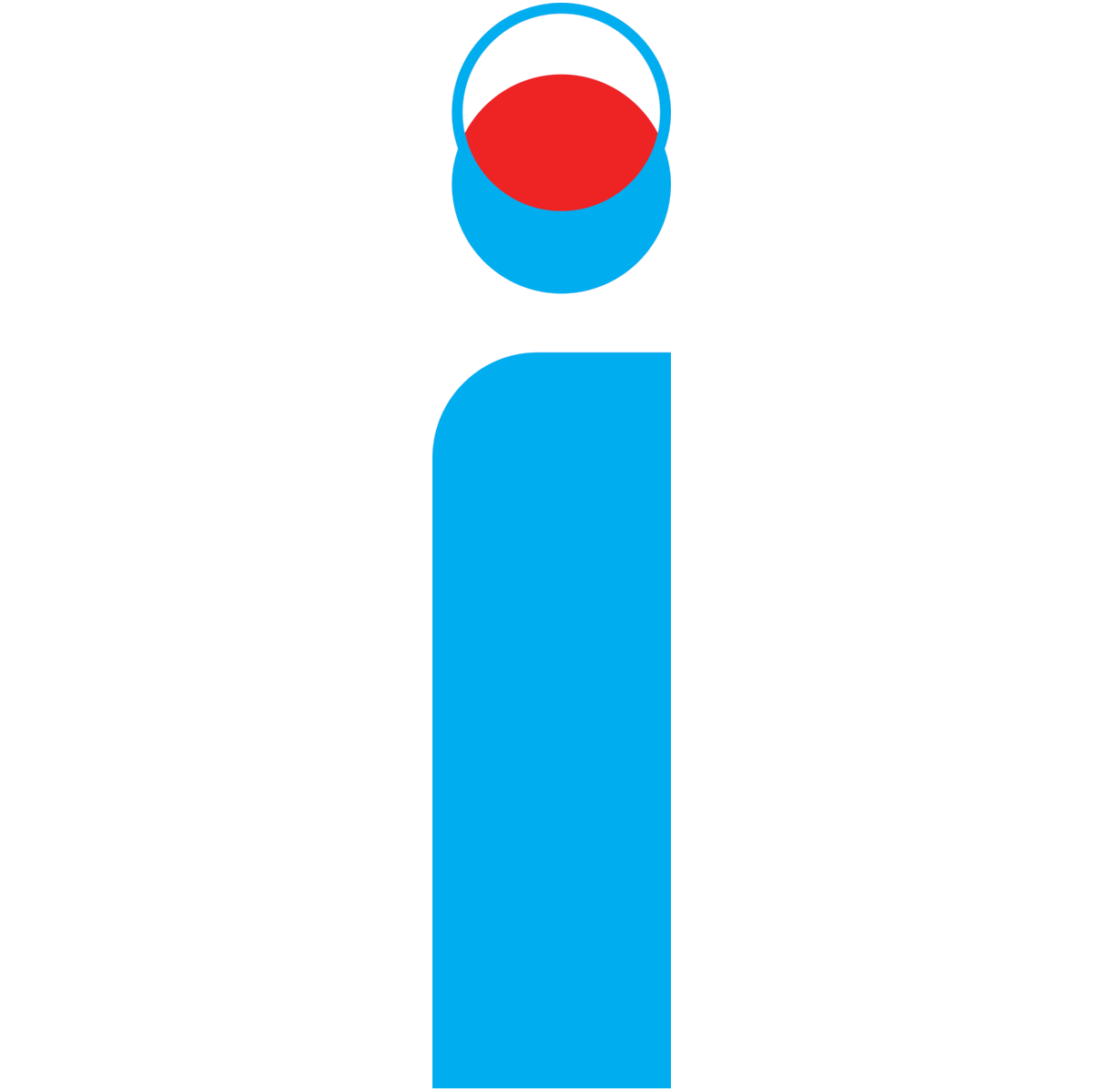

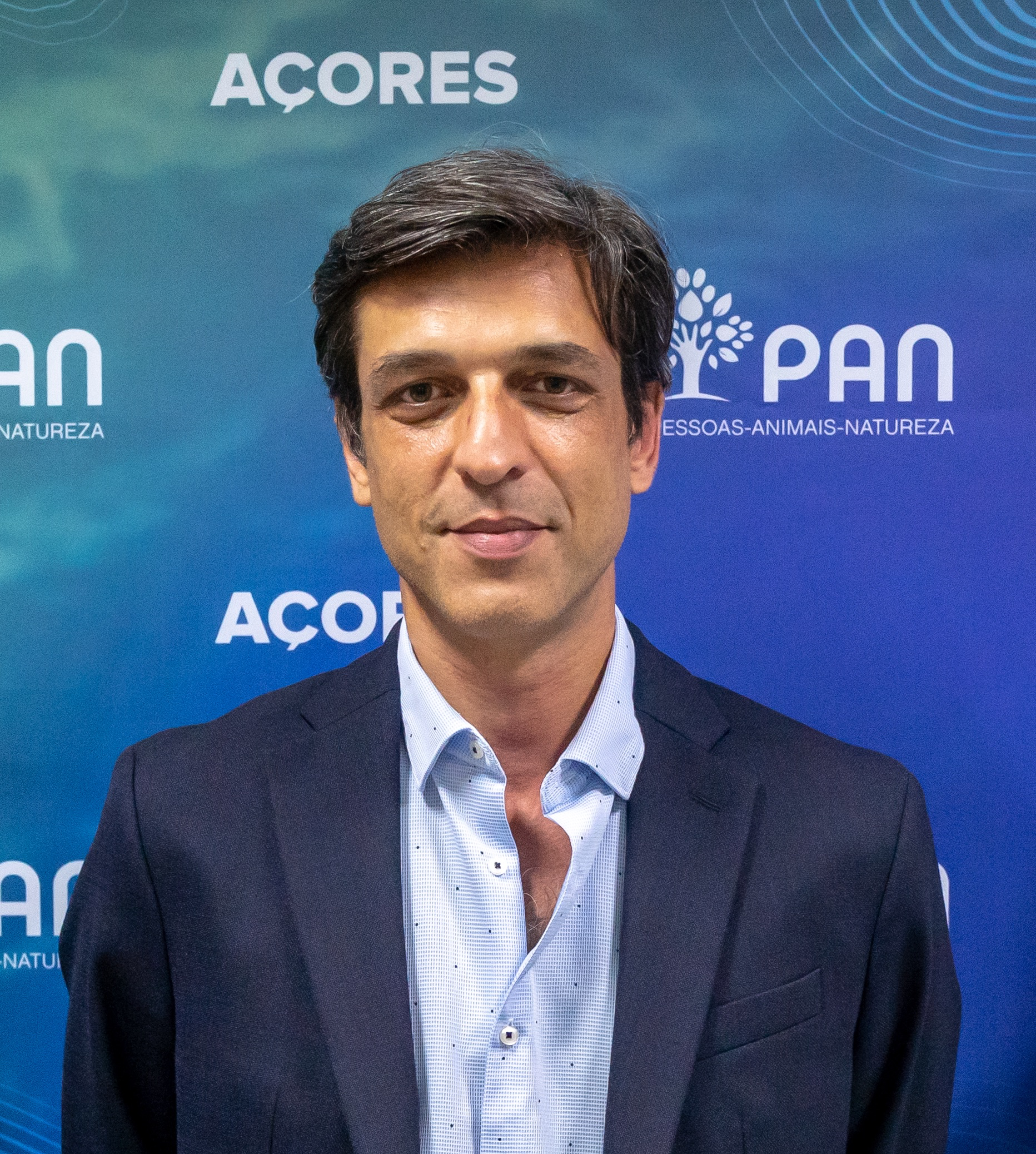
Leader	José Manuel Bolieiro	Francisco César	José Pacheco
Party	PSD	PS	CH
Leader since	14 December 2019	29 June 2024	23 April 2022
Leader's seat	São Miguel	—	São Miguel
Last election	23 seats (AD) (Note: In 2020, PSD, CDS and PPM ran in a joint coalition that won 26 seats, 23 PSD, 2 CDS and 1 PPM, with 42.1% of the votes.)	23 seats, 35.9%	5 seats, 9.2%
Seats needed	▲6	▲6	▲24
Leader	Artur Lima	Paulo Estêvão	António Lima
Party	CDS–PP	PPM	BE
Leader since	March 2007	2000	14 July 2018
Leader's seat	Terceira	Corvo	Compensatory list
Last election	2 seats (AD)	1 seat (AD)	1 seat, 2.5%
Seats needed	▲27	▲28	▲28
Leader	Hugo Almeida	Pedro Neves
Party	IL	PAN
Leader since	2 November 2024	2019
Leader's seat	—	Compensatory list
Last election	1 seat, 2.1%	1 seat, 1.6%
Seats needed	▲28	▲28
Incumbent President
José Manuel Bolieiro
PSD

The next Azorean regional election will be held on or before 22 October 2028, to determine the composition of the Legislative Assembly of the Autonomous Region of the Azores, Portugal. The election will replace all 57 members of the Azores Assembly, and the new members will then elect the President of the Autonomous Region.

President José Manuel Bolieiro, from the Social Democratic Party (PSD) leads a minority coalition government with the CDS – People's Party (CDS–PP) and the People's Monarchist Party (PPM). The parties in the coalition government contested the previous election in an electoral coalition, but will contest this election in separate lists.

== Background ==
Following the PSD/CDS/PPM coalition win in the 2024 regional election, in the October 2025 local elections, the PSD, CDS–PP and PPM lists, alone or in coalition, won a combined 39.5% of the votes and 10 councils (7 PSD; 1 PSD/CDS; 1 PSD/CDS/PPM; 1 CDS), holding the region's capital, Ponta Delgada, and also Horta. Despite winning the popular vote by the narrowest of margins, just 0.1% ahead of the PSD-led coalition, the PS won 8 councils, losing one compared to 2021. Independent movements held on to one council, while Chega made little progress.

=== End of the PSD/CDS/PPM coalition ===
In late April 2026, PSD-Azores leader and regional president José Manuel Bolieiro announced that the PSD would run alone in the next election, thus ending the coalition between the PSD and CDS–PP/PPM that contested the 2024 election, citing the terms of the agreement signed by the three parties. However, this announcement wasn't well received by the Social Democrats' junior partners, CDS–PP and PPM, with CDS–PP-Azores leader Artur Lima even floating around the idea of the party contesting the election in a coalition with the Socialist Party (PS).

=== Leadership changes and challenges ===
==== Socialist Party ====
A few weeks after the February 2024 election, Vasco Cordeiro announced his intention to not run for another term as party leader. A leadership ballot was called for 28 and 29 June 2024. Only one candidate was on the ballot, Francisco César, son of former President of the Regional Government Carlos César. As expected, Francisco César was easily elected with 93 percent of the votes:

Ballot: 28 and 29 June 2024
Candidate	Votes	%
Francisco César		93.3
Blank/Invalid ballots		6.7
Turnout		
Source: Expresso

==== Liberal Initiative ====
The Liberal Initiative held a leadership ballot on 1 and 2 November 2024. Nuno Barata, IL-Azores regional leader and regional parliament member decided not to run for another term as regional leader. Hugo Almeida was the sole candidate on the ballot. On 2 November 2024, Hugo Almeida was elected with 82 percent of the delegates votes:

Ballot: 1 and 2 November 2024
Candidate	Votes	%
Hugo Almeida	18	81.8
Abstentions	4	18.2
Turnout	22	

== Electoral system ==
The Azores regional parliament elects 57 members through a proportional system in which the 9 islands elect a number of MPs proportional to the number of registered voters. MPs are allocated by using the D'Hondt method. 5 members are also elected for a Compensation constituency. Current distribution of MPs by constituency:

Constituency	Total MPs	Registered voters
Corvo	2	
Faial	4	
Flores	3	
Graciosa	3	
Pico	4	
Santa Maria	3	
São Jorge	3	
São Miguel	20	
Terceira	10	
Compensation	5	
Total	57	

The next regional election is scheduled to take place between 28 September and 28 October 2028, so it must be held no later than 22 October 2028 if the legislature lasts its full 4-year term.

== Parties ==
=== Current composition ===
The table below lists parties represented in the Legislative Assembly of the Azores before the election.

Name		Ideology	Leader	2024 result		Status
Name		Ideology	Leader	%	Seats	Status
PPD/PSD	Social Democratic Party; Partido Social Democrata	Liberal conservatism	José Manuel Bolieiro	42.1%	23 / 57	Governing coalition
CDS–PP	CDS – People's Party; Centro Democrático Social – Partido Popular	Christian democracy	Artur Lima	42.1%	2 / 57	Governing coalition
PPM	People's Monarchist Party; Partido Popular Monárquico	Monarchism	Paulo Estêvão	42.1%	1 / 57	Governing coalition
PS	Socialist Party; Partido Socialista	Social democracy	Francisco César	35.9%	23 / 57	Opposition
CH	Enough! Chega!	National conservatism	José Pacheco	9.2%	5 / 57	Opposition
BE	Left Bloc; Bloco de Esquerda	Democratic socialism	António Lima	2.5%	1 / 57	Opposition
IL	Liberal Initiative; Iniciativa Liberal	Classical liberalism	Hugo Almeida	2.1%	1 / 57	Opposition
PAN	People Animals Nature; Pessoas-Animais-Natureza	Animal welfare	Pedro Neves	1.6%	1 / 57	Opposition

== Opinion polls ==
Polling firm/Link	Fieldwork date	Sample size	Turnout	PSD	CDS–PP	PPM	PS	CH	BE	IL	PAN	CDU	L	O	Lead
2025 local elections	12 Oct 2025	—N/a	53.9	39.5 (26)			39.6 (27)	7.9 (4)	0.7 (0)	1.3 (0)	—N/a	1.0 (0)	—N/a	10.0 (0)	0.1
2025 legislative election	18 May 2025	—N/a	43.8	36.6 (25)			23.6 (15)	22.9 (12)	2.1 (1)	3.5 (2)	1.3 (0)	1.2 (0)	2.5 (1)	6.4 (1)	13.0
2024 EP election	9 Jun 2024	—N/a	24.2	38.4 (25)			32.3 (22)	8.1 (4)	3.7 (2)	6.1 (3)	1.3 (0)	1.7 (0)	2.4 (1)	6.0 (0)	6.1
2024 legislative election	10 Mar 2024	—N/a	46.2	39.8 (26)			29.2 (20)	15.8 (8)	3.4 (1)	2.7 (1)	1.6 (0)	1.1 (0)	1.7 (1)	4.8 (0)	10.6
2024 regional election	4 Feb 2024	—N/a	50.3	42.1; 26			35.9; 23	9.2; 5	2.5; 1	2.1; 1	1.6; 1	1.6; 0	0.6; 0	3.1; 0	6.2
