= Terra Chã =

- Civil parish
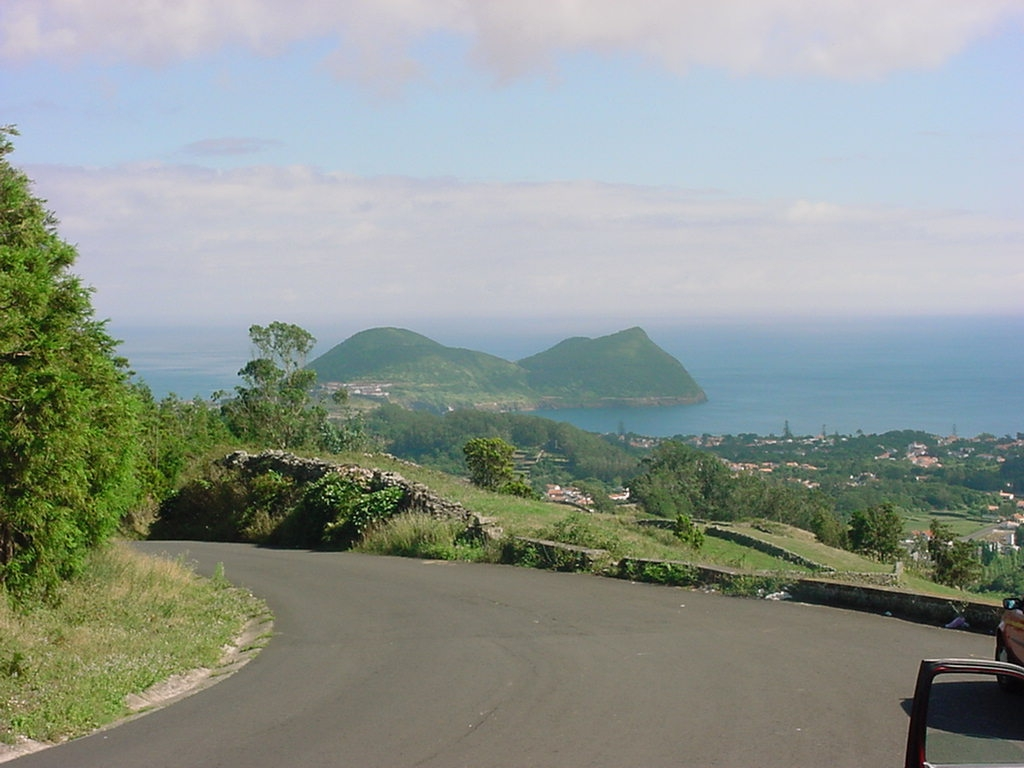
- A vista of Monte Brasil as seen from an ancillary road in the parish of Terra Chã

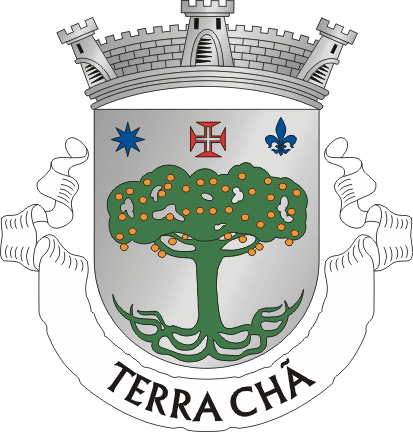
- Coat of arms

- Location in the Azores Terra Chã (Terceira)
- Coordinates: 38°41′14″N 27°15′22″W
- Country: Portugal
- Auton. region: Azores
- Island: Terceira
- Municipality: Angra do Heroísmo

Area
  - Total: 10.07 km^{2} (3.89 sq mi)
- Elevation: 245 m (804 ft)

Population (2011)
  - Total: 2,915
  - Density: 289.5/km^{2} (749.7/sq mi)
- Time zone: UTC−01:00 (AZOT)
  - Summer (DST): UTC+00:00 (AZOST)
- Postal code: 9700-711
- Area code: (+351) 292 XXX-XXXX
- Patron: Nossa Senhora de Belém
- Website: www.juntafterracha.com

Terra Chã (English: low land) is a civil parish in the municipality of Angra do Heroísmo on the island of Terceira in the Portuguese Azores. The population in 2011 was 2,915, in an area of 10.07 km^{2}.

Part of the suburban beltway of Angra, the ecumenical parish (São Pedro) was established by King John VI, who granted it a charter on 6 September 1825, but its borders and administrative organs were confirmed by act of the Civil Governor of Angra ten years later on 26 November 1835. However, according to the testament of Pero Anes do Canto, its establishment as a parish dates back to the 15th century.

Terra Chã was the centre of guerrilla activity during the Liberal Wars, as well as a support centre during World War II and later in the Portuguese Colonial War. The role played by the local Hospital Militar da Terra Chã during these periods was instrumental in driving development in the region.

== History ==
=== Early settlement ===
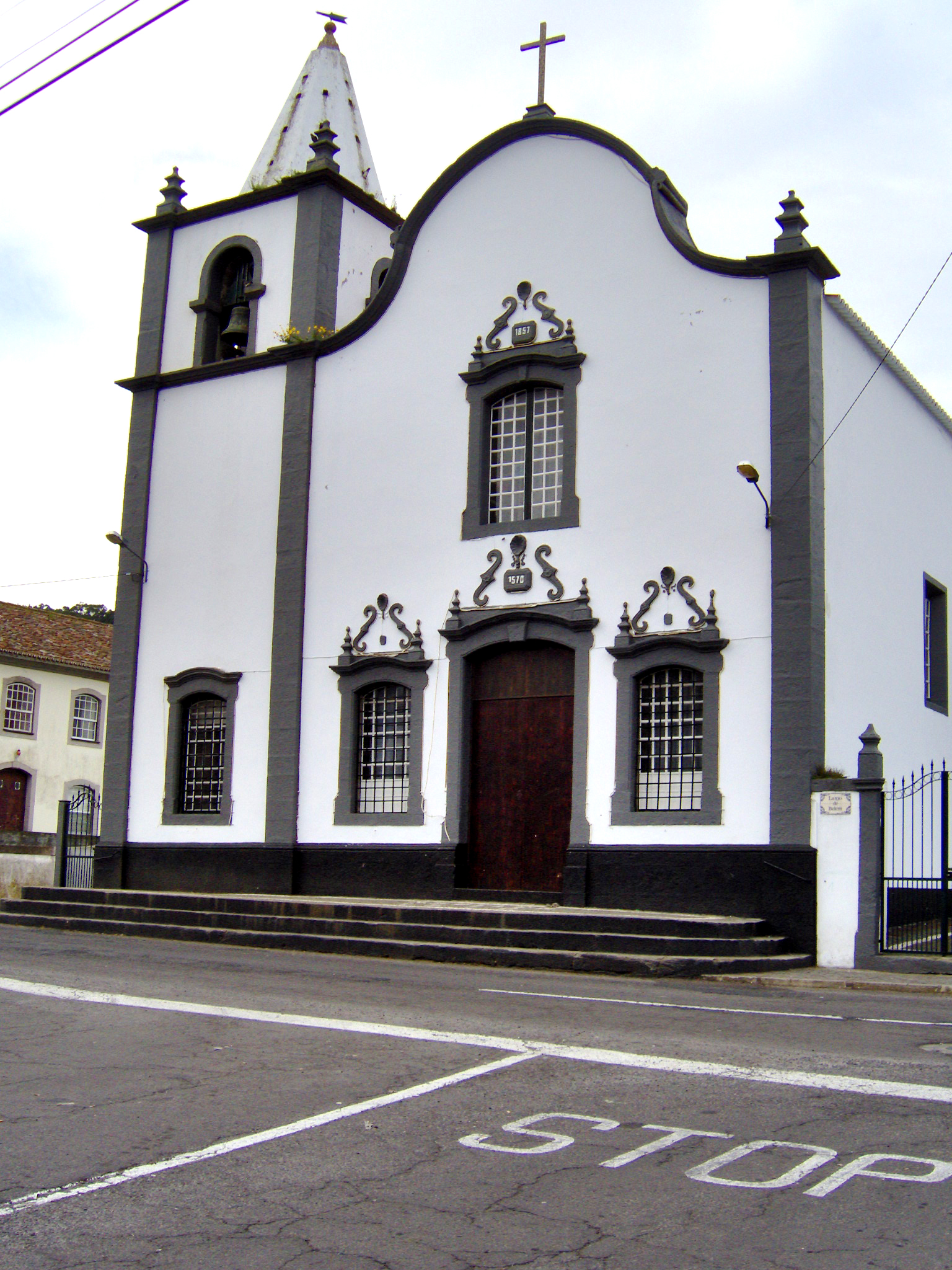
Parochial church of Nossa Senhora de Belém da Terra Chã

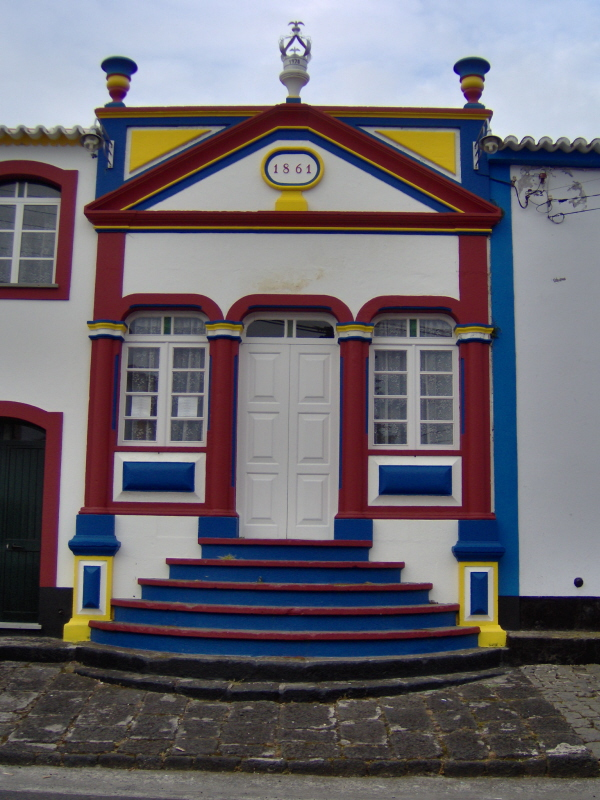
Império do Espírito Santo do Terreiro

The earliest document refers to the "Charcão", which is a toponymic derivative of charco (meaning: "a standing pool of water, which is not too deep, but filled with a mixture of unfiltered particulates"). This may have been a reference to wetlands, probably the first and only native water sources. Initially, the area around the present parish was a source of firewood for many of the residents of the town or settlers along the southern coast.

Early colonists to the area that is now Terra Cha (then part of the parish of São Pedro da Angra) were helped by a source of potable water. Ground water from many aquifers in the area, and a sloping landscape, along with the construction of many cisterns, provided a steady source of water, facilitating the colonization of the region (as evidenced from records which refer to the "town" of Terra Chã during the first century). Over time, these small pockets of settlement began to take shape, supported by reliable sources of water and the cultivation of vineyards and orchards.

The earliest recorded reference to Terra Chã da Silveira is in the testament of Pero Anes do Canto, who owned lands in this region between 1482 and 1515. His lands covered a large area that extended along the coast, in the parish of São Mateus da Calheta, up to Silveira on the periphery of Angra, and into the interior, to the base of Charcão ("the cone").

=== Medieval period ===
After 1572, Terra Chã was integrated into the religious parish of São Pedro de Angra, created after the division of the rural areas of the parish of Sé whose lands extended to the northwest in the direction of the island's interior plateau.

Consequent to the 1580 Portuguese succession crisis, Sebastião Álvares, a rich Angrense merchant, and his wife Grácia Fernandes built a primitive chapel to fulfil their vow to the Virgin of Belém. The legend associated with this vow is linked to the garrison of French troops that was presumably stationed on Terceira to support António, Prior of Crato. On one particular occasion, a group of French soldiers assaulted the home of Sebastião Álvares but the family survived without injury. As gratitude for divine intervention from the assault, the wealthy merchant constructed a chapel where, today, the parochial church of Nossa Senhora de Belém is erected. However, the date inscribed on the front façade of the church (1570), apparently the date of its founding, conflicts with the religious promise made by Sebastião Álvares in 1574.

In 1674, during the structuring of island administration, Terra Chã was elevated to the status of a religious parish within São Pedro de Angra, with its seat in the Chapel of Nossa Senhora de Belém (still today the centre of parochial life). Even for its small population, the chapel was diminutive and did not permit large services. For this reason, there was a desire for a spacious temple, which made João Moniz Corte Real) (a descendant of the original founder) cede lands around the chapel to construct a new church in its place. However, the beginning of the Liberal Wars, in which Corte Real was an important contributor, delayed the building of the new church, and it was only on 21 November 1846 that the cornerstone was placed. The lack of funds slowed its construction throughout the following years, and only in 1857, did the first services occur.

Being a densely forested zone with a labyrinth of small roads between its orchards and the residence of a Miguelist supporter (João Moniz Corte Real), Terra Chã became a place of refuge for absolutist sympathizers after Liberals took power in the city of Angra.

=== Liberal Wars ===
During the Liberal Wars, a local absolutist resistance movement took shape in Terra Chã against the Liberals, using tenets of guerrilla warfare. It became the centre of the resistance movement during the war. Two guerrillas from Terra Chã became celebrated: Boi Negro (English: Black Bull) and Rasgado (English: Ripped/Torn). Terra Chã was so well known for its guerrillas that Francisco Lourenço Valadão Júnior referred to Terra Chã as the alfobre de guerrilhas (English: Germinator of Guerrillas).

Some of the events of the guerrilla war are reflected in the toponymic names of the localities in the parish, including Casas Queimadas (English: Burned Casas) and Guerrilhas (English: Guerrillas). Casas Queimadas was named for an event where the home of André Machado Lemos, who lived with his family in a ranch along Caminho dos Regatos, was burned down. In 1828, a liberal emissary who travelled to Doze Ribeiras was attacked by a group of guerrillas attempting to seize a dispatch he was carrying. The Liberal took refuge in the home of André Lemos, and the soldiers attempted to burn down the home with all its contents and occupants. In the end, good sense prevailed on the part of the guerrillas who saved Lemos' family. Consequently, the home was referred locally as the casa queimada: the area name evolving from the place name over time.

=== World War II and Hospital Militar da Terra Chã ===
During World War II, Terra Chã was the centre of hospital services that were established to provide support to the Portuguese Expeditionary Forces, English military forces and American soldiers. The evolution of the Hospital Militar da Terra Chã and its role during the war started when it was constructed in front of the parochial church and became functional on 6 October 1943. The primary purpose of the hospital was to support the Portuguese Expeditionary Forces stationed on the island of Terceira, and English servicemen who disembarked. The hospital facility was further extended to American soldiers who used the installations at Lajes Field. In 1946, with the redeployment of Portuguese Expeditionary and English military forces from Lajes (substituted by the aforementioned American military), the Terra Chã Military Hospital fell under the administration of Air Base No.4, receiving on 9 September 1946 the designation Hospital Militar da BA4 (Terra-Chã). This title remained until 13 August 1972, when under Decree No.296/72 14 August, the Portuguese Armed Forces reorganized the health care system (Portuguese: Serviço de Saúde da Força Aérea Portuguesa) and rationalized various other administrative functions. At that time, the hospital was designated the Núcleo Hospital Especializado da Força Aérea 2 (NHEFA2) (English: Specialized Hospital Centre of Air Force 2).

It was the only Portuguese Air Force hospital between 1946 and 1975, when it was de-activated under Decree 525/75, 25 September, and Air Force services were concentrated in Lumiar, Lisbon, eventually becoming the Air Force Hospital. By the middle of the 1960s, the hospital in Terra Chã was used by military servicemen injured and evacuated from operational theatres of the Portuguese Colonial Wars in Africa. Hundreds of servicemen passed through the institution, which was important in altering the social structure of the parish. Its ranks were visited by notable medics who collaborated with the staff at the hospital in Angra. Among these was the military doctor Viriato Garrett, who arrived in Terceira in 1941 with ensigns from the militia, and who worked almost exclusively at the Angra Hospital since its founding. His activity as surgeon was particularly intense after 1957, when he joined the ranks of the Portuguese Air Force (FAP). He was promoted to Medical Captain and stationed at Air Base No.4, where he remained until the closing of the institution, becoming director of the hospital after 1966.

Following the war, during the 1960s, it served to treat defence forces returning from the Portuguese Colonial Wars in Africa. Following the closure of the hospital in 1966, the military hospital building served as a refuge for displaced colonial troops (Portuguese: Os Retornados as they were referred) returning from the independent colonies. But by 1976, the building was transferred to the newly established Instituto Universitario dos Açores (English: University of the Azores) to serve as its Angra Campus. In 2004, the campus was transferred to new facilities in Pico da Urze, and the building transformed into a technological park affiliated with the university.

=== Chronology ===
- 1825 – 6 September – Elevated to a religious parish by King John VI of Portugal;
- 1835 – 26 November – Borders delimited and civil administration of the parish of Terra Chã by King John VI of Portugal;
- 1846 – 21 November – Cornerstone placed on the parochial Church of Nossa Senhora de Belém;
- 1857 – Conclusion, consecration and opening of the parochial Church of Nossa Senhora de Belém;
- 1861 – Foundation of the Império do Espírito Santo da Terra Chã;
- 1864 – First population census using modern demographic criteria in the parish (1391 inhabitants);
- 1943 – 6 October – Constructed, in context of the Second World War, the Hospital Militar da Terra Chã (English: Military Hospital of Terra Chã) destined to support the Portuguese Expeditionary Forces, stationed on the island of Terceira, as well as British and American servicemen;
- 1958 – Foundation of the Império do Espírito Santo da Boa Hora;
- 1993 – Foundation of the Império do Espírito Santo do Bairro.

== Geography ==
The centre of Terra Chã is situated 5 kilometres (3.1 mi) northwest of the municipal seat, along the southern part of the island of Terceira. Located to the south of Angra do Heroísmo, the island capital, the parish of Terra Cha parish, was considered one of the most prosperous regions of the island in the 19th century due to its rich fertile lands and notable country houses of the nobility of the region. An area of irregular flat land, it is one of the few landlocked parishes on Terceira and in the Azores, with no discernible natural limits, situated at the base of the Serra do Charcão (an area locally designated on the southwest flanks of the Caldeira de Guilherme Moniz Massif). Without any coastal frontiers, it is delimited by its borders with the parishes of São Mateus da Calheta and São Pedro; to the west, northwest and north by the parish of São Bartolomeu de Regatos; and northeast and east by Posto Santo and Santa Luzia.

=== Physical geography ===
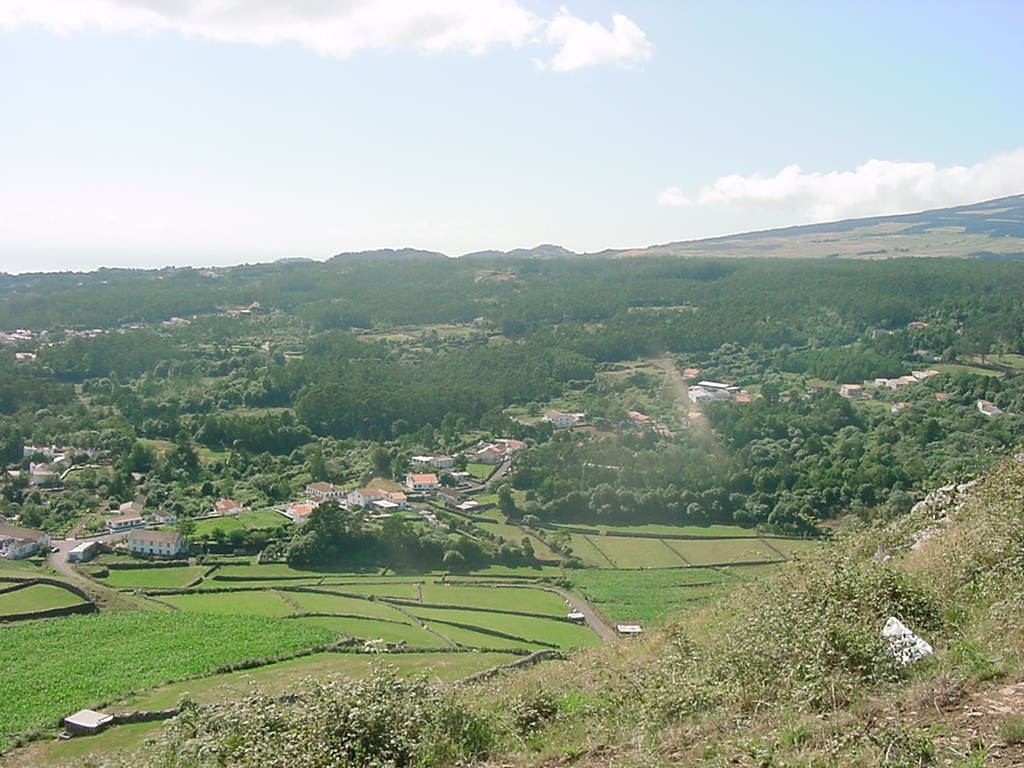
A view of Terra Chã, as seen from the Miradouro das Veredas, with the flank of Serra da Santa Bárbara on the right

The territory was formed by mostly basaltic magma within the last 100,000 years. Fissural eruptions around the area of Pico da Bagacina produced fluid lava that flowed to the coast of the island. The accumulation of successive flows produced a planar landscape with a surface covered in clinker geology. This layer was a combination of lightly dense lapilli and pyroclastic deposits that originated from the small cones in the immediate vicinity of the parish, namely Pico da Urze and Pico da Boa Hora. As a consequence of the genesis, the soils are exclusively arid or semi-arid regosols, with a predominance of sedimentary basalts resulting in the easy degradation of clinker topography, known more commonly as biscoitos (in the Azores) or breccia.

The exceptions to this occur along the flanks of Charcão and the upper altitudes around Veredas and Matela, zones of older rock (greater than 3 million year), composed of trachybasalt and trachyte that correspond to the formation of the Guilherme Moniz-Cinco Picos volcanic complexes. This zone, which follows a visible contour in the transition to the flatter parts of the parish, corresponds to the coast of the proto-island of Terceira and is marked by weathering, presented by some boulder formations typical of trachybasalt evolution of the landscape. It is covered primarily by pyroclastic trachytes, derived from the great eruptions after the post-caldera eruptions in the Serra da Santa Bárbara, and local activity around Matela, where a dense layer of pumice affected hydrothermal circulation. These local soils are more evolved, deep, and primarily andosols.

This genesis and geomorphology in Terra Chã resulted in two types of landscapes:

- A planar region (where the population is located) with a gentle incline of less than 3% that extends toward the north-northwest direction between the extreme south of Canada de Belém and the area around Pico da Bagacina. Soils are poor in this region, essentially breccia, very porous and, for that reason, deprived of functional water courses. This is an area of little agricultural value, but still, occupied at its lower limits by orchards and pasture which include Eucalyptus globulus and Pittosporum undulatum that have survived since the middle of the 20th century. The higher altitudes constitute poorer, semi-natural lands that have been used traditionally for the raising of bulls;
- A minor region, in the northeast of the parish, that corresponds to the western flank of the Guilherme Moniz massif (Charco) and a plateau in the area of Veredas/Matela, which has an accented relief, composed of pūmex and soil, that is easily transportable and of relative agricultural value. The region itself, due to its altitude and sloping landscape does not support settlement, but its soils are arable and occupied by a majority of the better pasturelands in the region. In areas with steeper inclines or that have experienced significant hydrothermal circulation (around Matela primarily), there exist patches of forest dominated by Cryptomeria japonica, as well as a stand of old-growth laurissilva forest.

=== Human geography ===
The urban structure is a mixed pattern of use, with a linear alignment typical of older rural Terceirense areas established around historical roads. Its roadways flow from the Portões de São Pedro towards Boa Hora and link the city of Angra to Doze Ribeiras, in addition to the settlements in the southwest and west of the island (the old Caminho de Cima, today the Estrada Municipal E.M.501).

Onto this network are natural patches of relatively urbanized settlements, constituted of recently constructed residential zones (mostly built after the 1980 earthquake) and of a markedly suburban character. This structure has resulted in the following nuclei:

- Boa Hora – a settlement located along a road from Angra, that splits off to the west (in the direction of Doze Ribeiras) and to the north (towards Pedregal on the way to Posto Santo, Veredes and the centre of the island). It is an old centre, with many historic buildings that were homes to important burgher families of Angra. It has its own Império to the Holy Spirit, site of annual festivals and community life;
- Belém – the oldest place and most centrally located parish, developed linearly along the Caminho de Cima (Estrada Municipal E.M.501), and including access to Belém-Largo da Igreja-Caminho de Belém-Terreiro-Dois Caminhos. This settlement is the centre of the parish, site of the parochial Church of Nossa Senhora de Belém, the Império do Espírito Santo de Terreiro and parish seat for a number of institutions, including Junta de Freguesia, Casa do Povo, primary school and kindergarten, Campus of the University of the Azores (the old Military Hospital Air Base No.4) and the recreational centre. Various manors punctuate this agglomeration, giving it a distinct character along the urban periphery;
- Bairro da Terra Chã – situated south of the parochial church and west of the Canada de Belém, it includes the residents in the Canada de Belém and Canada do Rolo, which grew from the neighbourhood (Portuguese: barrio) constructed to house residents after the 1 January 1980 earthquake, and subsequently improved and expanded. Today it is a principal residential nucleus of the parish, with Império and community centre, but functions as more of a bedroom community of Angra, whose population are largely recent transplants. The Canada de Belém is the older nucleus, having evolved linearly along the main road that connects the parish church along the Caminho do Meio and Caminho de Baixo (in São Mateus da Calheta), having its own Império since 1959;
- Fonte Faneca – another nucleus of a linear character, it developed along the road that splits into Dois Caminhos and extends into the interior of the island. It is an older consolidated agglomeration, although there has been a great deal of growth over the past decade, due to the improved accessibility to Angra;
- Ladeiras e Guerrilhas – concentrated along the roadway between Dois Caminhos and the parish frontier with São Bartolomeu de Regatos, in addition to the area in Caminho de Cima (between Dois Caminhos and Guerrilhas), this locality includes the higher altitude Canada da Francesa, adding a suburban character to the zone. Being the more elevated part of the parish, it includes scrub and forests of Eucalyptus and Incense, and was traditionally inhabited by woodsmen and shepherds tending to wild cattle.

The parish of Terra Chã has an extensive number of farms, which have historically been the place of residence and holiday homes of the bourgeoisie and the aristocracy of Angra do Heroísmo. The estates of these landlords were made up of a house, large yards with manicured gardens, orchards, vineyards, pastures and water fountains. Example of these properties include Solar dos Corvelos, Quinta de Nossa Senhora do Rosário, Quinta da Boa Hora, Quinta das Casas (Quinta de Santa Luzia), Quinta dos Simões, Quinta dos Prazeres, Quinta de Nossa Senhora da Guia and Quinta Viana, in addition to other estates along Canada do Fisher (Pedregal), the Quinta do Loura (Quinta do Boi Negro) and Árvore Grande (Canada de Belém).

==== Demographics ====
The first census in Terra Chã was conducted in 1864.

Population of Terra Chã (1864–2001)
| Year | Pop. | ±% |
|---|---|---|
| 1864 | 1,391 | — |
| 1878 | 1,339 | −3.7% |
| 1890 | 1,346 | +0.5% |
| 1900 | 1,267 | −5.9% |
| 1911 | 1,201 | −5.2% |
| 1920 | 1,137 | −5.3% |
| 1930 | 1,262 | +11.0% |
| 1940 | 1,258 | −0.3% |
| 1950 | 1,475 | +17.2% |
| 1960 | 1,575 | +6.8% |
| 1970 | 1,345 | −14.6% |
| 1981 | 1,329 | −1.2% |
| 1991 | 2,512 | +89.0% |
| 2001 | 2,783 | +10.8% |
| 2011 | 2,915 | +4.7% |

Demographically, the parish of Terra Chã (as with other communities on the island of Terceira) was marked by emigration, first to Brazil, then to the United States and finally to Canada. Also, the 1 January 1980 earthquake, which caused major damage on the island, triggered a wave of resettlements into Terra Chã. The effect of this demographic shift into the parish, caused by the resettlements into the Bairro da Terra Chã, are visible in the numbers after 1991 when the population of the parish almost doubled.

It is located at an average elevation of 23 metres (23 metres (75 ft)) above sea level.

== Economy ==
Close to town and situated in an area of poor land, the economy of Terra Chã has always been based on three sectors, which have been alternating in dominance over time. These are the cultivation of land and forestry activities (first, with the supply of firewood and timber to the city, then with the cultivation of vineyards and orchards), wild cattle grazing and bullfighting, and finally the service sector (which in recent decades has increased dramatically), especially tourism and hotel services.

The provision of kindling and wood, from the forests of the parish and from the hinterland of the Serra de Santa Bárbara, was an important economic activity until the last part of the 20th century, making Terra Chã a principal community of woodsmen on the island. The fabrication and provision of axes and sawmills, which reached appreciable dimensions, occupied an important part of the population of the parish. Wood would be transported by bull carts to the centre of Angra for sale, or prepared in artesian sawmills located in the hinterlands, before being sent to town to be used in construction, or carpentry.

Soil conditions, which did not permit easy cultivation, did allow the growth of grape fields in the lower parts of the parish and intermediary orchards. Although the area was humid, and not adequate for wine production, the cultivation of large tracts between Canada do Rolo and Boa Hora, and by manors around the Canada and Caminho de Belém persisted. The presence of vineyards explains the structure of lands (their preponderance in small parcels and limited by hedgerows) and the existence of small buildings that acted as wine cellars. The decline of the wine culture began in the first decades of the 19th century, in part caused by problems in preserving plants infected by powdery mildew, but also by the growth in the lucrative exportation of oranges to the United Kingdom. A good part of the vineyards were transformed into orange orchards. This transformation, and the resulting prosperity, gave origin to the construction of opulent manors. In addition to the orange, the orchards of Terra Chã also served a variety of fruit to the city of Angra, and the ships that docked in its ports.

The loss of the orange's competitiveness in the Azores (due to falling prices in England) and the concordant appearance of citrus diseases, forced the end of the lucrative business, causing most orchards to begin cultivating other fruits, sawmilling or reverting to the production of low-grade vineyards for public consumption. By the middle of the 19th century, the orange business had almost completely disappeared. The appearance of a chestnut industry then influenced the economy of Terra Chã, with the cultivation of extensive pasturelands with Viana Chestnut, which transformed itself into an emblem of the region, even to this day.

Another important area of activity in Terra Chã, which gave the parish the sobriquet title of terra dos pastores (English: land of the shepherds), was the raising and breeding of wild cattle. In the higher altitudes, above the Charcão and around Pico da Bagacina, there developed a lucrative bull-breeding business pioneered by a few rural gentry from Angra. These promoters and provisioners of animals for the island's traditional bullfighting (Portuguese: toiradas-à-corda) contracted men from the parish to raise their animals, attaining a notoriety on the island's bullfighting scene. The bull-breeding industry attained a level of sophistication at the beginning of the 20th century, through the influence of the Corvelo and Barcelos whom conquered the market for the purposes of Terceiran bullfighting. These cattle families would regularly transport their animals to holding pens through the streets of the village. The cattlemen would direct them down the Canada dos Pomares, Canada do Loural, Canada do Negro, Atalho das Lajes and Caminho do Tío Patrício, before they would be used in the traditional events.

After an intense period of emigration to the United States and Canada, which reached its peak in the 1960s, the 1980 earthquake profoundly altered the socio-economic balance of the parish, destroying the social veil that had existed. The construction of the Bairro da Terra Chã in lands that were originally intended for the Universidade dos Açores, for re-settlement of displaced families who had lost their homes in the earthquake, almost doubled the resident population in the parish. As a consequence, the locality assumed a position of suburban bedroom community to Angra, with the majority of its population employed in the construction sector. Today, the economy of Terra Chã is dominated by salary jobs in the urban area of Angra, causing the disappearance of the last vestiges of rural life that persisted.

== Architecture ==
=== Civic ===
- Estate of Boa Hora (Portuguese: Quinta da Boa Hora), one of the signeurial homes and estates of 18th-19th century property-owners, personal residence of the Barcelos family and their descendants;
- Scenic Overlook of the Veredas (Portuguese: Miradouro das Veredas)

=== Religious ===
- Império do Espírito Santo do Terreiro – dating back to 1861, the Corvelo family were great patrons of this império, and who annually contributed bread and meat to the poor, as well as asylum and comfort for the poor of the village. The festivals to the Holy Spirit are celebrated in Pentecost Sunday (during the festival of the First Bode), and on Trinity Sunday (festival of the Bodo da Trinidade)
- Império do Espírito Santo da Boa Hora
- Império do Espírito Santo do Bairro da Terra Chã
- Parochial Church of Nossa Senhora de Belém
- Chapel of Nossa Senhora da Boa Hora – constructed in the 17th century
- Chapel of Conceição – constructed in the 19th century
- Chapel of Nossa Senhora do Rosário – constructed in the 18th century

== Notable citizens ==
- António de Ávila Sabino, parish priest between 1919 and his death on 6 June 1958;
- António Rebelo (c.1902– c.1965), violin master;
- Francisco Ferreira dos Santos (25 October 1914 – 18 February 1981), a popular folk singer linked to the festivals of the Holy Spirit; but also, more importantly, for his improvisational style and his interpretations of "Charrua", "o Bravo", "o Tenrinho", "a Turlu", "o João Vital" and the "Gaitada". He also composed verses for popular folk dances, including the "Dança dos marinheiros" and "Dança de Camões, D. Miguel e D. Pedro IV"; commonly known as Ferreirinha das Bicas, it literally meant: small Ferreira of the pipes (Bicas was a locality in Terra Chã).
- Fernando da Rocha (6 January 1841 — 9 October 1892), magistrate and politician;
- Francisco de Paula de Barcelos Machado de Bettencourt (14 September 1831 — 19 April 1907), politician, bull-breeder and rural property owner;
- João Moniz Corte Real (23 July 1775 — 12 August 1877), military and Miguelist political leader on Terceira during the Portuguese Liberal Wars (1828–1834);
- José Martins Pereira (born 6 January 1898), a popular folk singer, remembered for his variations on "Reises", "Rancho de Matança" and who was regional fiddler; he lived his entire life in Terra Chã (in a home in front of Canada dos Folhadais), a stereotypical Terceirense, animated and jovial man who was best known for being a "manobrador" (English: maneouverer) of bulls during the Portuguese roped-bull events; his nickname José da Lata came from an episode in his life when he was the only one brave enough to tie a can to the horns of a wild bull (Jose da Lata, is literally, Joe of the Can).
- Joel Neto, journalist and writer;
- Maria Teotónia de Ornelas, professor;
- Roberto Luís de Mesquita Pimentel, politician and intellectual;
- Teotónio Machado Pires, jurist and politician.
