= 2024 Azorean regional election =

- 4 February 2024

57 seats to the Legislative Assembly of the Azores 29 seats needed for a majority
- Opinion polls
- Turnout: 50.3% ▲4.9 pp
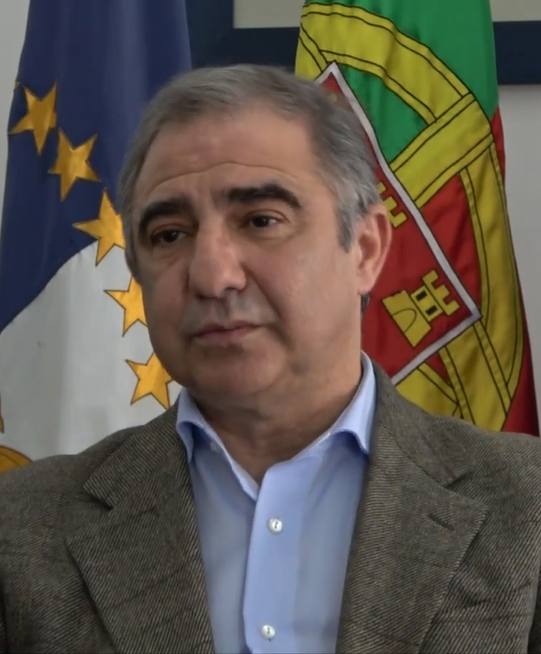

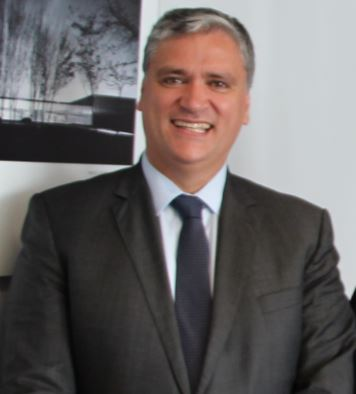

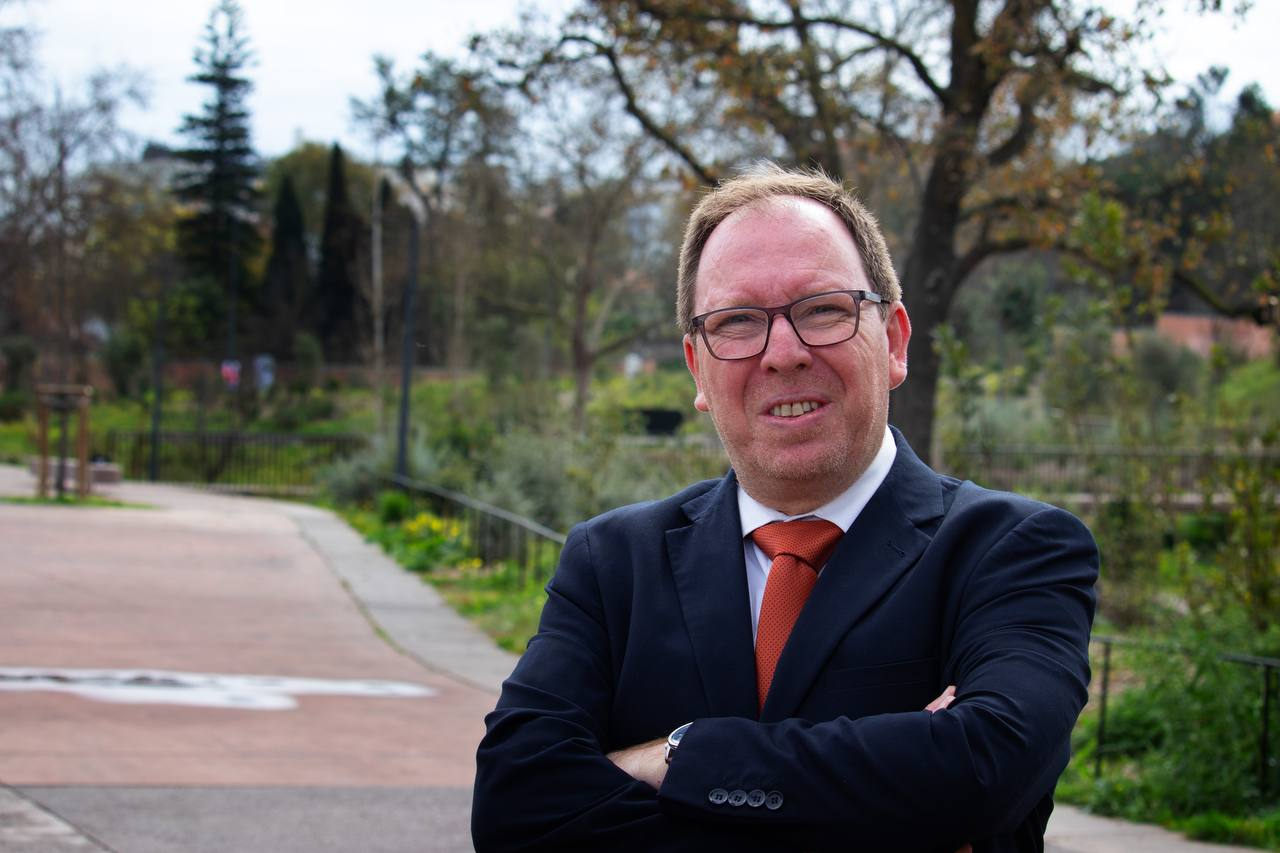

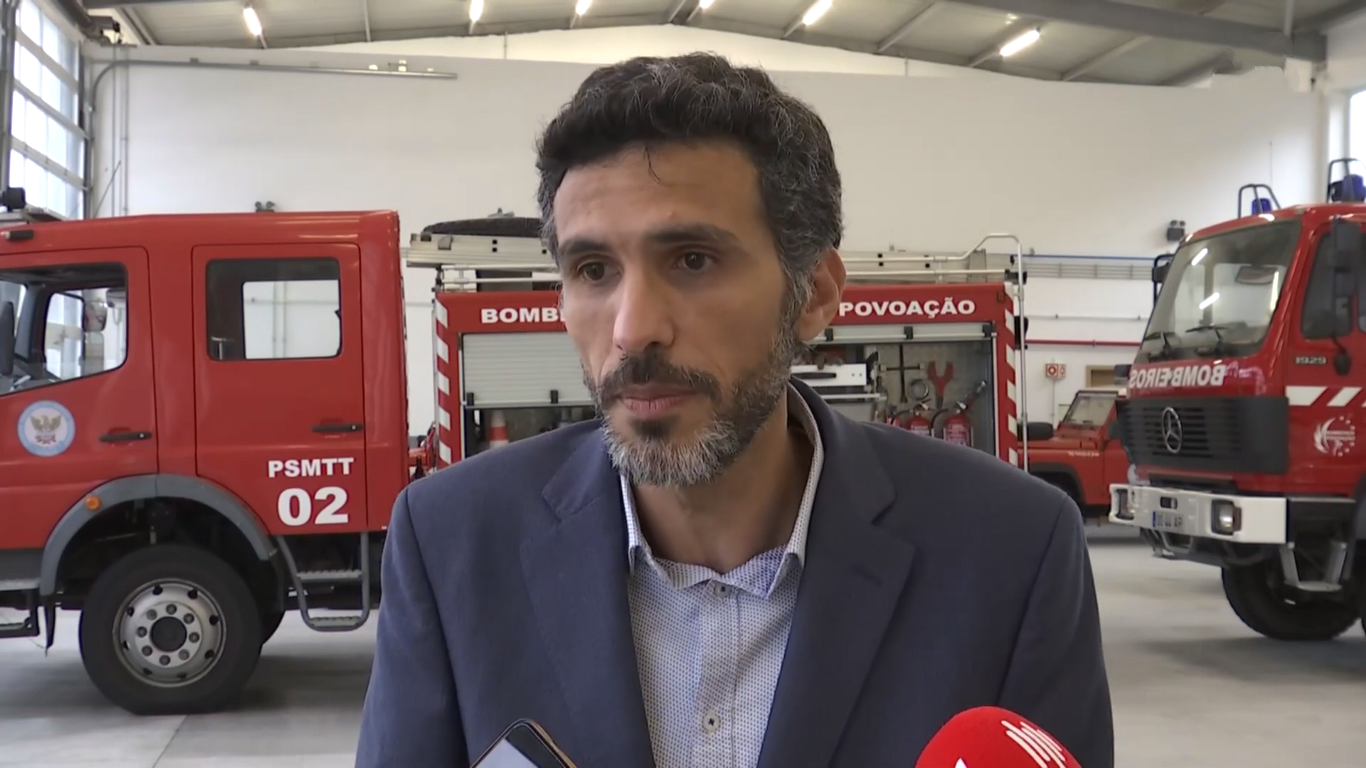

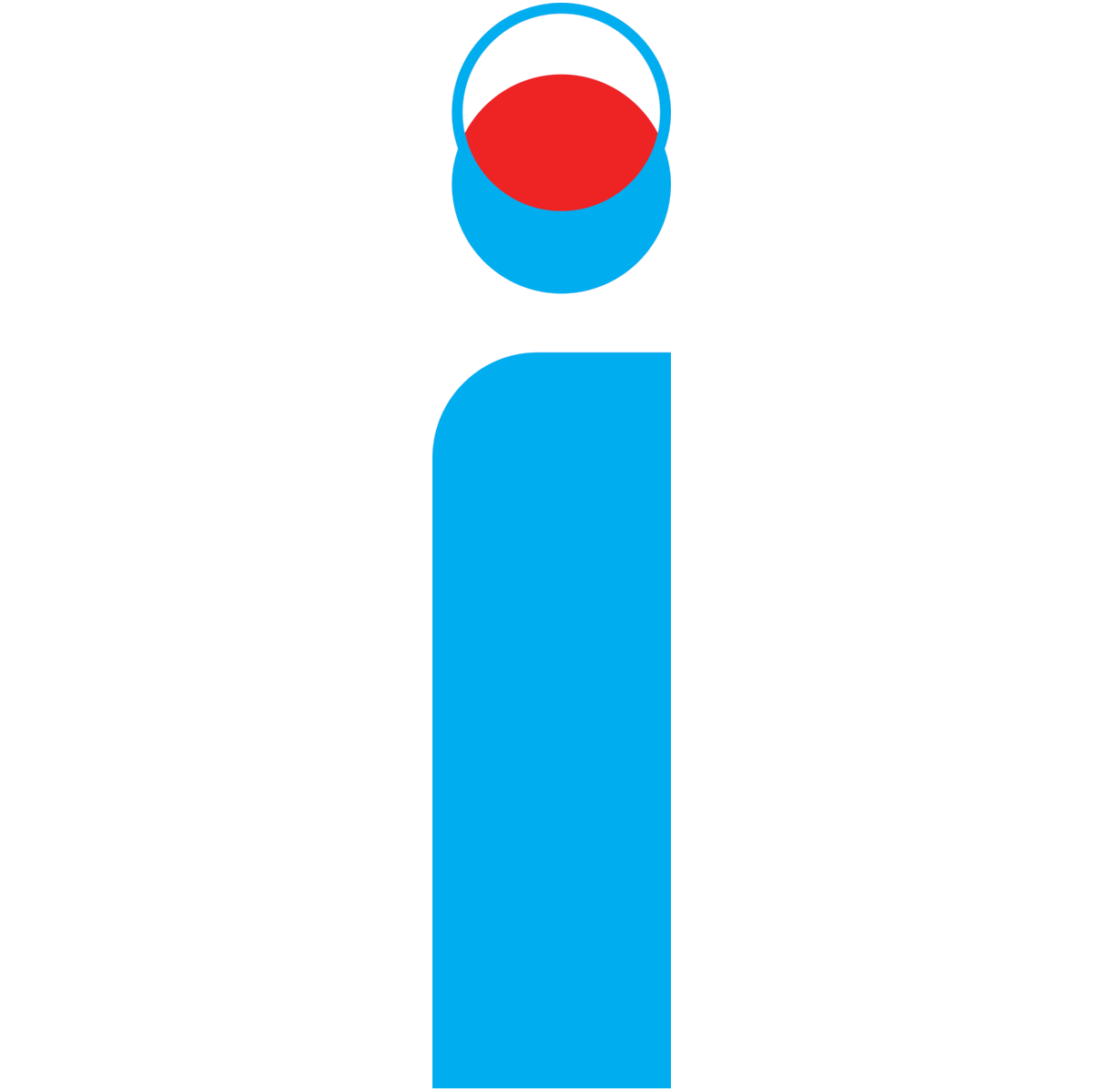

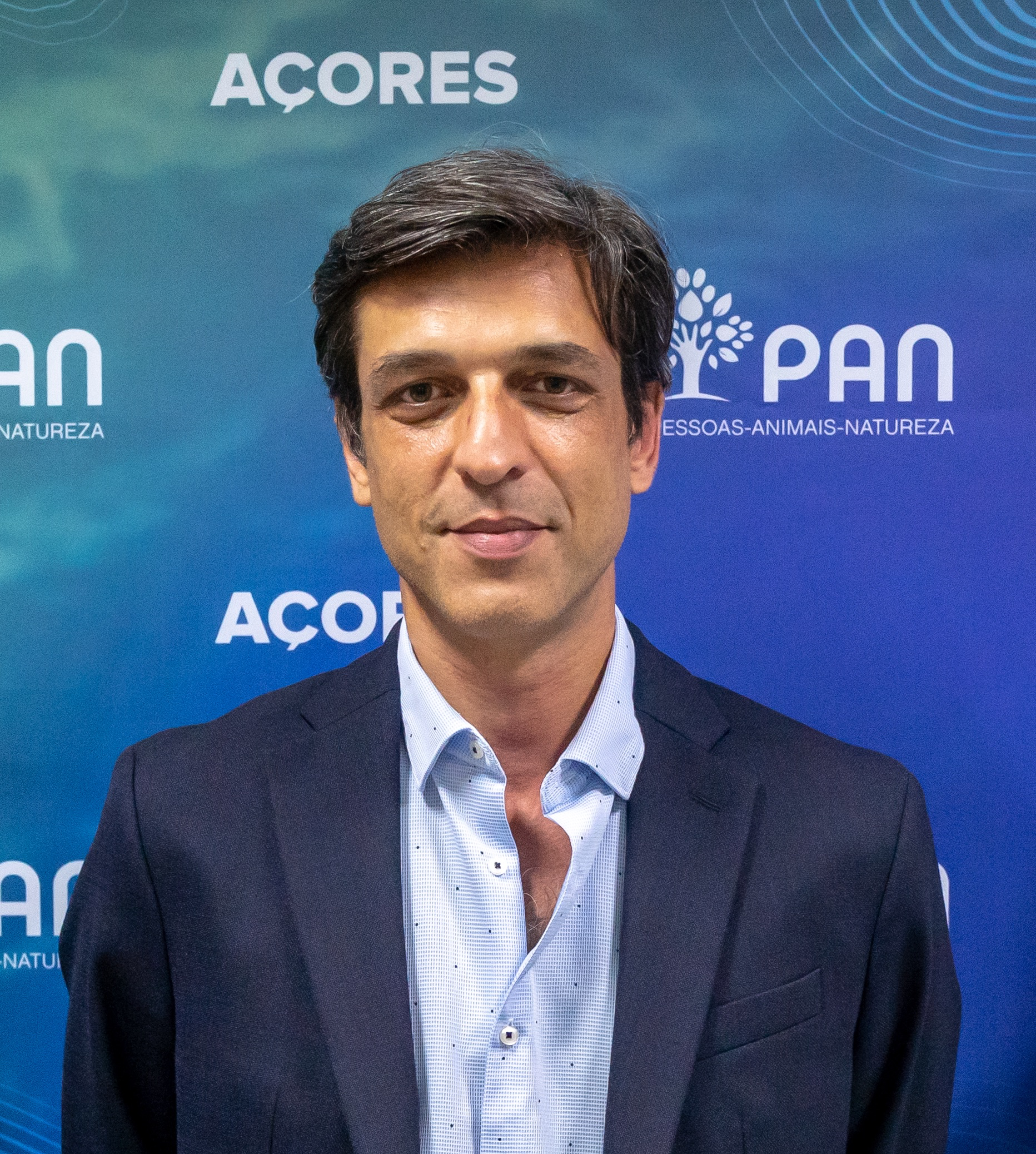
	First party	Second party	Third party
Leader	José Manuel Bolieiro	Vasco Cordeiro	José Pacheco
Party	PSD	PS	CH
Alliance	PSD/CDS/PPM
Leader since	14 December 2019 (Note: As leader of the Social Democratic Party (PSD).)	8 October 2011	23 April 2022
Leader's seat	São Miguel	São Miguel	São Miguel
Last election	26 seats, 41.7% (Note: Sum of votes and seats of the PSD, CDS–PP and PPM in the 2020 election. PSD: 33.7%, 21 seats; CDS–PP: 5.5%, 3 seats; PPM: 2.4%, 2 seats.)	25 seats, 39.1%	2 seats, 5.1%
Seats won	26	23	5
Seat change	0	▼2	▲3
Popular vote	48,672	41,538	10,627
Percentage	42.1%	35.9%	9.2%
Swing	▲0.4 pp	▼3.2 pp	▲4.1 pp
	Fourth party	Fifth party	Sixth party
Leader	António Lima	Nuno Barata	Pedro Neves
Party	BE	IL	PAN
Leader since	14 July 2018	2019	2019
Leader's seat	São Miguel (lost) (Note: Retained seat in the legislature via the compensatory list)	Compensatory list	Compensatory list
Last election	2 seats, 3.8%	1 seat, 1.9%	1 seat, 1.9%
Seats won	1	1	1
Seat change	▼1	0	0
Popular vote	2,936	2,482	1,907
Percentage	2.5%	2.1%	1.6%
Swing	▼1.3 pp	▲0.2 pp	▼0.3 pp
- Map showing island constituencies won by political parties.
President before election
José Manuel Bolieiro
PSD
Elected President
José Manuel Bolieiro
PSD

The 2024 Azorean regional election was held on 4 February 2024, to determine the composition of the Legislative Assembly of the Autonomous Region of the Azores. The election replaced all 57 members of the Azores Assembly, and the new members would then elect the President of the Autonomous Region. It was the first early election since Azores gained its autonomy in 1976.

President José Manuel Bolieiro, from the Social Democratic Party (PSD), led a coalition government between the Social Democrats, the CDS – People's Party (CDS–PP) and People's Monarchist Party (PPM), with the parliamentary support of Chega (CH) since late 2020. The Liberal Initiative (IL) initially supported the PSD coalition government but withdrew their support from the government on 8 March 2023. The Social Democrats, the CDS – People's Party and the People's Monarchist Party contested this election in a joint coalition as stipulated in their 2020 coalition agreement.

The PSD/CDS/PPM coalition won the election with 42 percent of the votes and elected 26 seats, the same number as of 2020. The Socialist Party (PS) failed to be the most voted party for the first time since 1996, gathering less than 36 percent of the votes and electing 23 seats, minus two compared with 2020.

Chega was the party that most increased in share, achieving 9 percent of the votes and electing 5 seats to the regional parliament. The party's result was seen as a prelude to next month's general election in which Chega saw a surge in support as well. The Left Bloc (BE) lost ground, compared with 2020, losing one seat, while the Liberal Initiative (IL) and the People-Animals-Nature (PAN) were able to hold on to their sole seats. The Unitary Democratic Coalition (CDU) failed to return to the regional parliament.

Turnout stood at 50.3 percent, the highest rate since 2004.

== Background ==
=== 2023 government crisis ===
The PSD/CDS-PP/PPM coalition government was, since the beginning, marred by instability due to political tensions between or within parties, especially Chega, which even lost a member of the regional Parliament during the Parliamentary term. But, on 8 March 2023, the Liberal Initiative decided to remove their support from the government, citing deep disagreements on policy and tensions between the minor parties within the coalition, CDS–PP and PPM particularly. Shortly after, the independent MP Carlos Furtado, a Chega dissident, also withdrew his support from the government, accusing the it of lack of institutional respect and for failing to follow the deal between both.

Following these announcements, which caused the government to lose its majority, President José Manuel Bolieiro rejected the idea of a motion of confidence and said that he would continue to govern, but that an early election could be likely. The PS, the main opposition party, discussed the possibility of presenting a motion of no confidence against the government, but the idea was dropped, and the PSD coalition governed as a minority and negotiated case by case with parties.

=== Rejection of the budget proposal for 2024 ===
In 23 November 2023, the parliament of Azores failed to approve the regional government's budget proposal for 2024. 28 MPs voted against it, 27 MPs voted in favor and 2 MPs abstained. The votes against it were cast by PS (25), BE (2) and IL (1). The votes in favor were by PSD (21), CDS–PP (3), PPM (2) and the independent MP Carlos Furtado (1). Chega (1) and PAN (1) abstained. According to the Framework Law for the Budget of the Autonomous Region of the Azores, the regional government must present a new budget proposal within 90 days of the rejection of the previous proposal. The president of the regional government, José Manuel Bolieiro, said he wanted to present a new budget proposal. That same day, the President of Portugal scheduled meetings for 30 November, at the Belém Palace in Lisbon, with the parties represented in the parliament of Azores.

On the meeting with the President of Portugal, in 30 November, José Manuel Bolieiro said that it seemed pointless to present a second budget proposal without a guarantee of its approval and that early regional legislative elections should be held as quickly as possible. He suggested the date of 4 February 2024 for the elections and announced that PSD, CDS–PP and PPM would run under a joint coalition. PS, CDS–PP, BE, PPM and IL also said they wanted early elections.

On 11 December, after meeting with the Council of State, the President of Portugal dissolved the regional parliament of the Azores and called early elections for 4 February 2024.

== Electoral system ==
The Azores regional parliament elects 57 members through a proportional system in which the 9 islands elect a number of MPs proportional to the number of registered voters. MPs are allocated by using the D'Hondt method. 5 members are also elected for a compensation constituency. Distribution of MPs by constituency:

Constituency	Total MPs	Registered voters
Corvo	2	355
Faial	4	13,005
Flores	3	3,083
Graciosa	3	3,872
Pico	4	13,808
Santa Maria	3	5,200
São Jorge	3	8,712
São Miguel	20	128,814
Terceira	10	53,072
Compensation	5	-
Total	57	229,921

== Parties ==
=== Composition ===
The table below lists parties represented in the Legislative Assembly of the Azores before the election.

Name		Ideology	Leader	2020 result		Seats at dissolution
Name		Ideology	Leader	%	Seats	Seats at dissolution
PS	Socialist Party; Partido Socialista	Social democracy	Vasco Cordeiro	39.1%	25 / 57	25 / 57
PPD/PSD	Social Democratic Party; Partido Social Democrata	Liberal conservatism	José Manuel Bolieiro	33.7%	21 / 57	21 / 57
CDS–PP	CDS – People's Party; Centro Democrático Social – Partido Popular	Conservatism	Artur Lima	5.5%	3 / 57	3 / 57
CH	Enough! Chega!	National conservatism Right-wing populism	José Pacheco	5.1%	2 / 57	1 / 57
BE	Left Bloc; Bloco de Esquerda	Left-wing populism	António Lima	3.8%	2 / 57	2 / 57
PPM	People's Monarchist Party; Partido Popular Monárquico	Monarchism	Paulo Estêvâo	2.4%	2 / 57	2 / 57
IL	Liberal Initiative; Iniciativa Liberal	Liberalism	Nuno Barata; José Luís Parreira	1.9%	1 / 57	1 / 57
PAN	People Animals Nature; Pessoas-Animais-Natureza	Animal welfare Environmentalism	Pedro Neves	1.9%	1 / 57	1 / 57
JPP	Together for the People; Juntos pelo Povo	Regionalism	Carlos Furtado (Note: Expelled from Chega's caucus)	Did not run		1 / 57

==== Seat changes ====
- On 14 July 2021, Chega's national leader, André Ventura, removed his confidence in party MP, and former regional leader, Carlos Furtado, but Furtado decided to remain in the regional assembly as an Independent. In December 2023, Furtado announced he had joined the Together for the People party and would become the party's regional leader in the Azores.

=== Parties running in the election ===
11 lists will be on the ballot for the 2024 Azorean regional election, eight parties and three coalitions. The parties that will contest the election and their lead candidates, are: (alphabetically ordered)

- National Democratic Alternative (ADN), Rui Matos
- Left Bloc (BE), António Lima
- Unitary Democratic Coalition (CDU), Marco Varela
- Chega (CH), José Pacheco
- Liberal Initiative (IL), Nuno Barata
- Together for the People (JPP), Carlos Furtado
- LIVRE (L), José Azevedo
- Earth Party/Alliance Alternative 21 coalition (MPT/A), José Olívio Arranhado
- People-Animals-Nature (PAN), Pedro Neves
- Social Democratic Party/CDS – People's Party/People's Monarchist Party coalition (PSD/CDS–PP/PPM), José Manuel Bolieiro
- Socialist Party (PS), Vasco Cordeiro

== Campaign period ==
=== Party slogans ===
Party or alliance	Original slogan	English translation	Refs
PSD/CDS/PPM	« Unidos pelos Açores »	"United by the Azores"	
PS	« Vasco Cordeiro, o Presidente de Confiança »	"Vasco Cordeiro, the Trusted President"	
CH	« Os Açores precisam de uma limpeza »	"The Azores needs a clean up"	
BE	« Levar a sério os Açores »	"Taking the Azores seriously"	
IL	« A alternativa é Liberal »	"The alternative is Liberal"	
PAN	« Um por todos. Todos pelos Açores »	"One for all. All for the Azores"	
JPP	« Em frente. Sem medo! »	"Forward. Without fear!"	

=== Candidates' debates ===
2024 Azorean regional election debates
Date	Organisers	Moderator(s)	P Present (Note: Denotes a main invitee attending the event.) S Surrogate (Note: Denotes a main invitee not attending the event, sending a surrogate in their place.) NI Not invited I Invited A Absent invitee										
Date	Organisers	Moderator(s)	PSD/CDS/PPM	PS	CH	BE	IL	PAN	CDU	L	JPP	ADN	Ref.
21 Jan	RTP Açores	João Simas	P Bolieiro	P Cordeiro	A Pacheco	P Lima	P Barata	P Neves	P Varela	P Azevedo	P Furtado	P Matos	

== Opinion polls ==
Exit poll

Polling firm/Link	Fieldwork date	Sample size	Turnout	PS	Democratic Alliance			CH	BE	IL	PAN	CDU	O	Lead
Polling firm/Link	Fieldwork date	Sample size	Turnout	PS	PSD	CDS–PP	PPM	CH	BE	IL	PAN	CDU	O	Lead
2024 regional election	4 Feb 2024	—N/a	50.3	35.9; 23	42.1; 26			9.2; 5	2.5; 1	2.1; 1	1.6; 1	1.6; 0	4.9; 0	6.2
CESOP–UCP	4 Feb 2024	9,475	50–56	32–37; 19/25	40–45; 25/31			8–11; 4/8	1–3; 0/1	1–3; 0/1	1–3; 0/1	1–3; 0/1	—N/a	8
CESOP–UCP	27–28 Jan 2024	2,297	—N/a	39; 23/27	36; 22/26			9; 3/5	3; 0/2	2; 0/1	2; 0/1	2; 0/1	7; 0	3
Aximage (Note: Results presented here exclude undecideds (13.3%). With their inclusion results are: PSD/CDS/PPM: 36.6%; PS: 33.5%; CH: 6.3%; BE: 1.9%; PAN: 1.9%; IL: 1.4%; CDU: 1.3%; Others/Invalid: 3.8%.)	18–24 Jan 2024	411	—N/a	38.6	42.2			7.3	2.2	1.6	2.2	1.4	4.4	3.6
2022 legislative election	30 Jan 2022	—N/a	36.7	42.8	33.9			5.9	4.3	4.1	1.4	1.5	6.1	8.9
2021 local elections	26 Sep 2021	—N/a	54.2	43.1	46.4			1.2	1.8	0.6	0.5	1.2	5.2	3.3
2020 regional election	25 Oct 2020	—N/a	45.4	39.1; 25	33.7; 21	5.5; 3	2.4; 2	5.1; 2	3.8; 2	1.9; 1	1.9; 1	1.7; 0	4.9; 0	5.4

== Voter turnout ==
The table below shows voter turnout throughout election day.

Turnout	Time								
Turnout	11:00			15:00 (Note: In 2020, voter turnout update was with data until 16:00.)			19:00		
Turnout	2020	2024	±	2020	2024	±	2020	2024	±
Total	9.16%	13.77%	▲4.61 pp	32.68%	34.84%	▲2.16 pp	45.41%	50.33%	▲4.92 pp

== Results ==
=== Regional summary ===
Summary of the 4 February 2024 Legislative Assembly of Azores elections results
Parties	Votes	%	±pp swing	MPs				
Parties	Votes	%	±pp swing	2020	2024	±	%	±
PSD/CDS/PPM coalition	48,672	42.08	▲0.4	26	26	0	45.61	0.0
Socialist	41,538	35.92	▼3.2	25	23	▼2	40.35	▼3.5
Chega	10,627	9.19	▲4.1	2	5	▲3	8.77	▲5.3
Left Bloc	2,936	2.54	▼1.3	2	1	▼1	1.75	▼1.7
Liberal Initiative	2,482	2.15	▲0.2	1	1	0	1.75	0.0
People-Animals-Nature	1,907	1.65	▼0.3	1	1	0	1.75	0.0
Democratic Unity Coalition	1,821	1.57	▼0.1	0	0	0	0.00	0.0
LIVRE	735	0.64	▲0.2	0	0	0	0.00	0.0
Together for the People	626	0.54	—N/a	—N/a	0	—N/a	0.00	—N/a
National Democratic Alternative	378	0.33	—N/a	—N/a	0	—N/a	0.00	—N/a
Alternative 21 (Earth Party/Alliance)	4	0.00	▼0.6	0	0	0	0.00	0.0
Total valid	111,726	96.60	▲0.2	57	57	0	100.00	0.0
Blank ballots	2,522	2.18	▼0.3					
Invalid ballots	1,407	1.22	▲0.0					
Total	115,655	100.00						
Registered voters/turnout	229,909	50.30	▲4.9					

Vote share
PSD/CDS/PPM	42.08%
PS	35.92%
CH	9.19%
BE	2.54%
IL	2.15%
PAN	1.65%
CDU	1.57%
Others	1.51%
Blank/Invalid	3.40%

Parliamentary seats
PSD/CDS/PPM	45.61%
PS	40.35%
CH	8.77%
BE	1.75%
IL	1.75%
PAN	1.75%

=== Results by constituency ===
Results of the 2024 election of the Legislative Assembly of Azores by constituency
Constituency	%	S	%	S	%	S	%	S	%	S	%	S	Total S
Constituency	PSD/CDS/ PPM		PS		CH		BE		IL		PAN		Total S
Corvo	39.7	1	53.4	1	0.7	-	0.0	-			0.0	-	2
Faial	48.2	2	32.3	2	4.3	-	2.9	-	0.8	-	1.1	-	4
Flores	30.6	1	41.8	2	7.8	-	0.8	-			0.7	-	3
Graciosa	46.2	2	43.7	1	4.1	-	0.5	-	0.6	-	0.7	-	3
Pico	47.5	2	37.7	2	4.4	-	1.9	-	1.7	-	1.1	-	4
Santa Maria	34.3	1	41.5	2	6.5	-	7.2	-	3.4	-	0.8	-	3
São Jorge	52.2	2	29.9	1	3.7	-	0.8	-	3.5	-	0.6	-	3
São Miguel	39.7	10	35.2	8	11.8	2	2.8	-	2.2	-	2.3	-	20
Terceira	43.6	5	37.1	4	8.1	1	2.3	-	2.4	-	1.0	-	10
Compensation		-		-		2		1		1		1	5
Total	42.1	26	35.9	23	9.2	5	2.5	1	2.2	1	1.7	1	57
Source: Resultados Finais

== Aftermath ==
The PSD/CDS/PPM coalition failed to win an outright majority but, nonetheless, the right-wing parties, altogether, won a strong majority of 32 seats. However, any kind of deal between the Coalition, Chega and the Liberal Initiative would prove very difficult due to deep disagreements between parties, and José Manuel Bolieiro announced he would govern as a minority. Bolieiro asked for "common sense" from the PS, but the Socialists announced that they would vote against a PSD/CDS/PPM minority. On 20 February 2024, Boleiro was nominated as President of the Regional Government by the Representative of the Republic in the Azores, Pedro Catarino. The new Azores regional parliament was sworn in on 22 February 2024. Bolieiro second cabinet was sworn in on 4 March 2024 and the government's program was approved on 15 March with the votes of PSD, CDS and PPM, and abstentions from Chega, IL and PAN. PS and BE voted against, as it was expected.

2024 Motion of confidence José Manuel Bolieiro (PSD)
Ballot →	15 March 2024
Required majority →	Simple
Yes: • PSD (23); • CDS–PP (2); • PPM (1)	26 / 57
No: • PS (23); • BE (1)	24 / 57
Abstentions: • CH (5); • IL (1); • PAN (1)	7 / 57
Absentees	0 / 57
Result →	Approved
