= Azores (Assembly of the Republic constituency) =

Constituency of the Assembly of the Republic, the national legislature of Portugal

- Açores
- Constituency for the Assembly of the Republic
- Location of Azores within the Atlantic region
- Autonomous Region: Azores
- Population: 241,718 (2024)
- Electorate: 230,289 (2025)
- Area: 2,322 km^{2} (2024)

Current Constituency
- Created: 1979
- Seats: 5 (1979–present)
- Deputies: List: Francisco César (PS); Ana Martins (CH); Nuna Menezes (PSD); Paulo Moniz (PSD); Francisco Pimentel (PSD)
- Created from: List: Angra do Heroísmo; Horta; Ponta Delgada

Azores (Portuguese: Açores) is one of the 22 multi-member constituencies of the Assembly of the Republic, the national legislature of Portugal. The constituency was established in 1979 after Portugal's Atlantic islands were granted autonomy. It is conterminous with the autonomous region of Azores. The constituency currently elects five of the 230 members of the Assembly of the Republic using the closed party-list proportional representation electoral system. At the 2025 legislative election it had 230,289 registered electors.

== Electoral system ==
Azores currently elects five of the 230 members of the Assembly of the Republic using the closed party-list proportional representation electoral system. Seats are allocated using the D'Hondt method.

== Election results ==
=== Summary ===
Election	Unitary Democrats CDU / APU / PCP			Left Bloc BE / UDP			LIVRE L			Socialists PS			People Animals Nature PAN			Democratic Renewal PRD			Social Democrats PSD / AD / PPD			Liberals IL			CDS – People's CDS–PP / AA / CDS			Chega CH / PPV/CDC / PPV		
Election	Votes	%	Seats	Votes	%	Seats	Votes	%	Seats	Votes	%	Seats	Votes	%	Seats	Votes	%	Seats	Votes	%	Seats	Votes	%	Seats	Votes	%	Seats	Votes	%	Seats
2025	1,224	1.27%	0	2,106	2.18%	0	2,539	2.62%	0	23,825	24.63%	1	1,314	1.36%	0				36,886	38.13%	3	3,484	3.60%	0				23,059	23.83%	1
2024	1,161	1.13%	0	3,622	3.53%	0	1,817	1.77%	0	31,016	30.23%	2	1,659	1.62%	0				42,352	41.28%	2	2,882	2.81%	0				16,749	16.32%	1
2022	1,249	1.55%	0	3,613	4.47%	0	759	0.94%	0	35,838	44.37%	3	1,159	1.43%	0				28,330	35.07%	2	3,466	4.29%	0				4,991	6.18%	0
2019	2,045	2.61%	0	6,662	8.51%	0	714	0.91%	0	33,473	42.76%	3	2,212	2.83%	0				25,258	32.26%	2	568	0.73%	0	4,014	5.13%	0	707	0.90%	0
2015	2,321	2.61%	0	7,323	8.25%	0	331	0.37%	0	37,720	42.47%	3	816	0.92%	0				33,665	37.90%	2				3,624	4.08%	0			
2011	2,288	2.66%	0	3,965	4.60%	0				23,189	26.92%	2	756	0.88%	0				42,622	49.49%	3				10,896	12.65%	0			
2009	2,093	2.26%	0	6,966	7.52%	0				37,826	40.84%	3							34,041	36.75%	2				9,841	10.63%	0	142	0.15%	0
2005	1,575	1.76%	0	2,636	2.95%	0				48,528	54.29%	3							31,385	35.11%	2				3,675	4.11%	0			
2002	1,257	1.42%	0	1,269	1.44%	0				36,792	41.62%	2							40,740	46.09%	3				7,521	8.51%	0			
1999	1,620	1.76%	0	993	1.08%	0				49,954	54.15%	3							33,524	36.34%	2				5,219	5.66%	0			
1995	1,855	1.77%	0	457	0.44%	0				39,909	38.14%	2							50,757	48.50%	3				9,971	9.53%	0			
1991	1,406	1.37%	0	374	0.36%	0				27,022	26.24%	1				372	0.36%	0	67,155	65.22%	4				3,591	3.49%	0			
1987	2,188	2.35%	0	486	0.52%	0				19,017	20.40%	1				2,870	3.08%	0	63,450	68.07%	4				3,129	3.36%	0			
1985	4,532	4.47%	0	1,192	1.17%	0				20,838	20.53%	1				15,780	15.55%	1	50,137	49.41%	3				6,710	6.61%	0			
1983	3,303	3.17%	0	614	0.59%	0				33,408	32.09%	2							58,536	56.22%	3				5,020	4.82%	0			
1980	3,671	3.16%	0	1,566	1.35%	0				32,812	28.25%	1							68,663	59.12%	4				5,467	4.71%	0			
1979	3,977	3.18%	0	2,257	1.81%	0				38,795	31.05%	2							67,598	54.10%	3				9,518	7.62%	0			

(Figures in italics represent alliances.)

=== Detailed ===
==== 2020s ====
===== 2025 =====
Results of the 2025 legislative election held on 18 May 2025:

Party		Votes	%	Seats
Democratic Alliance	AD	36,886	38.13%	3
Socialist Party	PS	23,825	24.63%	1
Chega	CH	23,059	23.83%	1
Liberal Initiative	IL	3,484	3.60%	0
LIVRE	L	2,539	2.62%	0
Left Bloc	BE	2,106	2.18%	0
National Democratic Alternative	ADN	1,666	1.72%	0
People Animals Nature	PAN	1,314	1.36%	0
Unitary Democratic Coalition	CDU	1,224	1.27%	0
Together for the People	JPP	271	0.28%	0
React, Include, Recycle	RIR	135	0.14%	0
Earth Party	PT	122	0.13%	0
Ergue-te	E	119	0.12%	0
Valid votes		96,750	100.00%	5
Blank votes		3,010	2.98%	
Rejected votes – other		1,150	1.14%	
Total polled		100,910	43.82%	
Registered electors		230,289		

The following candidates were elected:: Francisco César (PS); Francisco Meneses de Lima (CH); Nuna Menezes (AD); Paulo Moniz (AD); and Francisco Pimentel (AD).

===== 2024 =====
Results of the 2024 legislative election held on 10 March 2024:

Party		Votes	%	Seats
Democratic Alliance	AD	42,352	41.28%	2
Socialist Party	PS	31,016	30.23%	2
Chega	CH	16,749	16.32%	1
Left Bloc	BE	3,622	3.53%	0
Liberal Initiative	IL	2,882	2.81%	0
LIVRE	L	1,817	1.77%	0
People Animals Nature	PAN	1,659	1.62%	0
Unitary Democratic Coalition	CDU	1,161	1.13%	0
National Democratic Alternative	ADN	827	0.81%	0
Together for the People	JPP	213	0.21%	0
React, Include, Recycle	RIR	123	0.12%	0
Volt Portugal	Volt	115	0.11%	0
Ergue-te	E	64	0.06%	0
Valid votes		102,600	100.00%	5
Blank votes		2,621	2.47%	
Rejected votes – other		1,056	0.99%	
Total polled		106,277	46.19%	
Registered electors		230,082		

The following candidates were elected: Miguel Arruda (CH); Sergio Ávila (PS); Francisco César (PS); Paulo Moniz (AD); and Francisco Pimentel (AD).

===== 2022 =====
Results of the 2022 legislative election held on 30 January 2022:

Party		Votes	%	Seats
Socialist Party	PS	35,838	44.37%	3
Democratic Alliance	AD	28,330	35.07%	2
Chega	CH	4,991	6.18%	0
Left Bloc	BE	3,613	4.47%	0
Liberal Initiative	IL	3,466	4.29%	0
Unitary Democratic Coalition	CDU	1,249	1.55%	0
People Animals Nature	PAN	1,159	1.43%	0
LIVRE	L	759	0.94%	0
National Democratic Alternative	ADN	486	0.60%	0
Portuguese Workers' Communist Party	PCTP	322	0.40%	0
React, Include, Recycle	RIR	201	0.25%	0
Earth Party	PT	150	0.19%	0
Socialist Alternative Movement	MAS	88	0.11%	0
Volt Portugal	Volt	67	0.08%	0
Ergue-te	E	55	0.07%	0
Valid votes		80,774	100.00%	5
Blank votes		2,090	2.50%	
Rejected votes – other		873	1.04%	
Total polled		83,737	36.56%	
Registered electors		229,022		

The following candidates were elected: Sergio Ávila (PS); Francisco César (PS); Paulo Moniz (AD); Francisco Pimentel (AD); and Isabel Rodrigues (PS).

==== 2010s ====
===== 2019 =====
Results of the 2019 legislative election held on 6 October 2019:

Party		Votes	%	Seats
Socialist Party	PS	33,473	42.76%	3
Social Democratic Party	PSD	25,258	32.26%	2
Left Bloc	BE	6,662	8.51%	0
CDS – People's Party	CDS–PP	4,014	5.13%	0
People Animals Nature	PAN	2,212	2.83%	0
Unitary Democratic Coalition	CDU	2,045	2.61%	0
Alliance	A	732	0.94%	0
LIVRE	L	714	0.91%	0
Chega	CH	707	0.90%	0
Liberal Initiative	IL	568	0.73%	0
Portuguese Workers' Communist Party	PCTP	528	0.67%	0
People's Monarchist Party	PPM	418	0.53%	0
Earth Party	PT	327	0.42%	0
National Renewal Party	PNR	269	0.34%	0
Portuguese Labour Party	PTP	146	0.19%	0
Socialist Alternative Movement	MAS	113	0.14%	0
Democratic Republican Party	PDR	99	0.13%	0
Valid votes		78,285	100.00%	5
Blank votes		3,926	4.70%	
Rejected votes – other		1,350	1.62%	
Total polled		83,561	36.50%	
Registered electors		228,946		

The following candidates were elected: João Azevedo Castro (PS); Lara Martinho (PS); Paulo Moniz (PSD); Isabel Rodrigues (PS); and António Ventura (PSD).

===== 2015 =====
Results of the 2015 legislative election held on 4 October 2015:

Party		Votes	%	Seats
Socialist Party	PS	37,720	42.47%	3
Social Democratic Party	PSD	33,665	37.90%	2
Left Bloc	BE	7,323	8.25%	0
Alliance Azores (CDS – People's Party and People's Monarchist Party)	AA	3,624	4.08%	0
Unitary Democratic Coalition	CDU	2,321	2.61%	0
People Animals Nature	PAN	816	0.92%	0
We, the Citizens!	NC	769	0.87%	0
Portuguese Workers' Communist Party	PCTP	593	0.67%	0
Democratic Republican Party	PDR	511	0.58%	0
United Party of Retirees and Pensioners	PURP	346	0.39%	0
LIVRE	L	331	0.37%	0
ACT! (Portuguese Labour Party and Socialist Alternative Movement)	AGIR	318	0.36%	0
The Earth Party Movement	MPT	300	0.34%	0
National Renewal Party	PNR	180	0.20%	0
Valid votes		88,817	100.00%	5
Blank votes		3,036	3.25%	
Rejected votes – other		1,554	1.66%	
Total polled		93,407	41.14%	
Registered electors		227,040		

The following candidates were elected Berta Cabral (PSD); João Azevedo Castro (PS); Carlos César (PS); Lara Martinho (PS); and António Ventura (PSD).

===== 2011 =====
Results of the 2011 legislative election held on 5 June 2011:

Party		Votes	%	Seats
Social Democratic Party	PSD	42,622	49.49%	3
Socialist Party	PS	23,189	26.92%	2
CDS – People's Party	CDS–PP	10,896	12.65%	0
Left Bloc	BE	3,965	4.60%	0
Unitary Democratic Coalition	CDU	2,288	2.66%	0
Party for Animals and Nature	PAN	756	0.88%	0
Portuguese Workers' Communist Party	PCTP	669	0.78%	0
Democratic Party of the Atlantic	PDA	389	0.45%	0
The Earth Party Movement	MPT	314	0.36%	0
Portuguese Labour Party	PTP	293	0.34%	0
People's Monarchist Party	PPM	271	0.31%	0
Hope for Portugal Movement	MEP	257	0.30%	0
National Renewal Party	PNR	219	0.25%	0
Valid votes		86,128	100.00%	5
Blank votes		3,250	3.60%	
Rejected votes – other		898	0.99%	
Total polled		90,276	40.13%	
Registered electors		224,959		

The following candidates were elected: Mota Amaral (PSD); Lídia Bulcão (PSD); Carlos Enes (PS); Joaquim Ponte (PSD); and Ricardo Rodrigues (PS).

==== 2000s ====
===== 2009 =====
Results of the 2009 legislative election held on 27 September 2009:

Party		Votes	%	Seats
Socialist Party	PS	37,826	40.84%	3
Social Democratic Party	PSD	34,041	36.75%	2
CDS – People's Party	CDS–PP	9,841	10.63%	0
Left Bloc	BE	6,966	7.52%	0
Unitary Democratic Coalition	CDU	2,093	2.26%	0
Portuguese Workers' Communist Party	PCTP	608	0.66%	0
The Earth Party Movement	MPT	380	0.41%	0
People's Monarchist Party	PPM	313	0.34%	0
Hope for Portugal Movement	MEP	259	0.28%	0
Merit and Society Movement	MMS	148	0.16%	0
Pro-Life Party	PPV	142	0.15%	0
Valid votes		92,617	100.00%	5
Blank votes		1,804	1.89%	
Rejected votes – other		868	0.91%	
Total polled		95,289	43.64%	
Registered electors		218,339		

The following candidates were elected: Mota Amaral (PSD); Luiz Fagundes Duarte (PS); Joaquim Ponte (PSD); Ricardo Rodrigues (PS); and Maria Luísa Santos (PS).

===== 2005 =====
Results of the 2005 legislative election held on 20 February 2005:

Party		Votes	%	Seats
Socialist Party	PS	48,528	54.29%	3
Social Democratic Party	PSD	31,385	35.11%	2
CDS – People's Party	CDS–PP	3,675	4.11%	0
Left Bloc	BE	2,636	2.95%	0
Unitary Democratic Coalition	CDU	1,575	1.76%	0
New Democracy Party	ND	691	0.77%	0
Portuguese Workers' Communist Party	PCTP	425	0.48%	0
Democratic Party of the Atlantic	PDA	317	0.35%	0
National Renewal Party	PNR	148	0.17%	0
Valid votes		89,380	100.00%	5
Blank votes		1,289	1.41%	
Rejected votes – other		646	0.71%	
Total polled		91,315	48.22%	
Registered electors		189,376		

The following candidates were elected: Mota Amaral (PSD); Victor Cruz (PSD); Luiz Fagundes Duarte (PS); Renato Leal (PS); and Ricardo Rodrigues (PS).

===== 2002 =====
Results of the 2002 legislative election held on 17 March 2002:

Party		Votes	%	Seats
Social Democratic Party	PSD	40,740	46.09%	3
Socialist Party	PS	36,792	41.62%	2
CDS – People's Party	CDS–PP	7,521	8.51%	0
Left Bloc	BE	1,269	1.44%	0
Unitary Democratic Coalition	CDU	1,257	1.42%	0
People's Monarchist Party	PPM	358	0.41%	0
Portuguese Workers' Communist Party	PCTP	281	0.32%	0
The Earth Party Movement	MPT	177	0.20%	0
Valid votes		88,395	100.00%	5
Blank votes		693	0.77%	
Rejected votes – other		720	0.80%	
Total polled		89,808	48.07%	
Registered electors		186,832		

The following candidates were elected: Mota Amaral (PSD); Victor Cruz (PSD); Luiz Fagundes Duarte (PS); Medeiros Ferreira (PS); and Joaquim Ponte (PSD).

==== 1990s ====
===== 1999 =====
Results of the 1999 legislative election held on 10 October 1999:

Party		Votes	%	Seats
Socialist Party	PS	49,954	54.15%	3
Social Democratic Party	PSD	33,524	36.34%	2
CDS – People's Party	CDS–PP	5,219	5.66%	0
Unitary Democratic Coalition	CDU	1,620	1.76%	0
Left Bloc	BE	993	1.08%	0
Democratic Party of the Atlantic	PDA	438	0.47%	0
Portuguese Workers' Communist Party	PCTP	331	0.36%	0
The Earth Party Movement	MPT	176	0.19%	0
Valid votes		92,255	100.00%	5
Blank votes		687	0.73%	
Rejected votes – other		782	0.83%	
Total polled		93,724	50.22%	
Registered electors		186,614		

The following candidates were elected: Mota Amaral (PSD); Isabel Barata (PS); Luiz Fagundes Duarte (PS); Medeiros Ferreira (PS); and Joaquim Ponte (PSD).

===== 1995 =====
Results of the 1995 legislative election held on 1 October 1995:

Party		Votes	%	Seats
Social Democratic Party	PSD	50,757	48.50%	3
Socialist Party	PS	39,909	38.14%	2
CDS – People's Party	CDS–PP	9,971	9.53%	0
Unitary Democratic Coalition	CDU	1,855	1.77%	0
Democratic Party of the Atlantic	PDA	921	0.88%	0
Popular Democratic Union	UDP	457	0.44%	0
Revolutionary Socialist Party	PSR	393	0.38%	0
Portuguese Workers' Communist Party	PCTP	387	0.37%	0
Valid votes		104,650	100.00%	5
Blank votes		566	0.53%	
Rejected votes – other		1,042	0.98%	
Total polled		106,258	56.42%	
Registered electors		188,327		

The following candidates were elected: Mota Amaral (PSD); Sérgio Ávila (PS); Medeiros Ferreira (PS); Lalanda Gonçalves (PSD); and Reis Leite (PSD).

===== 1991 =====
Results of the 1991 legislative election held on 6 October 1991:

Party		Votes	%	Seats
Social Democratic Party	PSD	67,155	65.22%	4
Socialist Party	PS	27,022	26.24%	1
Social Democratic Centre Party	CDS	3,591	3.49%	0
Democratic Party of the Atlantic	PDA	1,632	1.58%	0
Unitary Democratic Coalition	CDU	1,406	1.37%	0
Revolutionary Socialist Party	PSR	564	0.55%	0
Portuguese Workers' Communist Party	PCTP	509	0.49%	0
Popular Democratic Union	UDP	374	0.36%	0
Democratic Renewal Party	PRD	372	0.36%	0
People's Monarchist Party	PPM	341	0.33%	0
Valid votes		102,966	100.00%	5
Blank votes		609	0.58%	
Rejected votes – other		1,217	1.16%	
Total polled		104,792	57.54%	
Registered electors		182,112		

The following candidates were elected: Mota Amaral (PSD); Manuel Silva Azevedo (PSD); Martins Goulart (PS); Reis Leite (PSD); and Mário Maciel (PSD).

==== 1980s ====
===== 1987 =====
Results of the 1987 legislative election held on 19 July 1987:

Party		Votes	%	Seats
Social Democratic Party	PSD	63,450	68.07%	4
Socialist Party	PS	19,017	20.40%	1
Social Democratic Centre Party	CDS	3,129	3.36%	0
Democratic Renewal Party	PRD	2,870	3.08%	0
Unitary Democratic Coalition	CDU	2,188	2.35%	0
Christian Democratic Party	PDC	977	1.05%	0
Popular Democratic Union	UDP	486	0.52%	0
People's Monarchist Party	PPM	411	0.44%	0
Portuguese Workers' Communist Party	PCTP	375	0.40%	0
Portuguese Democratic Movement	MDP	316	0.34%	0
Valid votes		93,219	100.00%	5
Blank votes		702	0.74%	
Rejected votes – other		1,257	1.32%	
Total polled		95,178	54.22%	
Registered electors		175,532		

The following candidates were elected: José Melo Alves (PSD); Mota Amaral (PSD); Vargas Bulcão (PSD); Carlos César (PS); and Mário Maciel (PSD).

===== 1985 =====
Results of the 1985 legislative election held on 6 October 1985:

Party		Votes	%	Seats
Social Democratic Party	PSD	50,137	49.41%	3
Socialist Party	PS	20,838	20.53%	1
Democratic Renewal Party	PRD	15,780	15.55%	1
Social Democratic Centre Party	CDS	6,710	6.61%	0
United People Alliance	APU	4,532	4.47%	0
Popular Democratic Union	UDP	1,192	1.17%	0
Christian Democratic Party	PDC	770	0.76%	0
Revolutionary Socialist Party	PSR	649	0.64%	0
Workers' Party of Socialist Unity	POUS	533	0.53%	0
Portuguese Workers' Communist Party	PCTP	302	0.30%	0
Valid votes		101,479	99.96%	5
Blank votes		761	0.73%	
Rejected votes – other		1,690	1.63%	
Total polled		103,930	60.19%	
Registered electors		172,664		

The following candidates were elected: José Melo Alves (PSD); Mota Amaral (PSD); Roberto Amaral (PRD); Vargas Bulcão (PSD); and António Simas (PS).

===== 1983 =====
Results of the 1983 legislative election held on 25 April 1983:

Party		Votes	%	Seats
Social Democratic Party	PSD	58,536	56.22%	3
Socialist Party	PS	33,408	32.09%	2
Social Democratic Centre Party	CDS	5,020	4.82%	0
United People Alliance	APU	3,303	3.17%	0
Democratic Party of the Atlantic	PDA	1,509	1.45%	0
People's Monarchist Party	PPM	634	0.61%	0
Popular Democratic Union	UDP	614	0.59%	0
Revolutionary Socialist Party	PSR	356	0.34%	0
Workers' Party of Socialist Unity	POUS	293	0.28%	0
Portuguese Workers' Communist Party	PCTP	285	0.27%	0
Socialist Workers League	LST	161	0.15%	0
Valid votes		104,119	100.00%	5
Blank votes		693	0.65%	
Rejected votes – other		2,574	2.40%	
Total polled		107,386	66.48%	
Registered electors		161,530		

The following candidates were elected: Mota Amaral (PSD); Ricardo Barros (PS); António Ourique Mendes (PSD); Avelino Rodrigues (PS); and Raul Santos (PSD).

===== 1980 =====
Results of the 1980 legislative election held on 5 October 1980:

Party		Votes	%	Seats
Social Democratic Party	PSD	68,663	59.12%	4
Socialist Party	PS	32,812	28.25%	1
Social Democratic Centre Party	CDS	5,467	4.71%	0
United People Alliance	APU	3,671	3.16%	0
Democratic Party of the Atlantic	PDA	1,878	1.62%	0
Popular Democratic Union	UDP	1,566	1.35%	0
Portuguese Workers' Communist Party	PCTP	590	0.51%	0
Workers' Party of Socialist Unity	POUS	590	0.51%	0
Revolutionary Socialist Party	PSR	542	0.47%	0
Labour Party	PT	370	0.32%	0
Valid votes		116,149	100.00%	5
Blank votes		1,284	1.07%	
Rejected votes – other		2,968	2.47%	
Total polled		120,401	76.24%	
Registered electors		157,927		

The following candidates were elected: Mota Amaral (PSD); Vargas Bulcão (PSD); Jaime Gama (PS); António Ourique Mendes (PSD); and João Vasco Paiva (PSD).

==== 1970s ====
===== 1979 =====
Results of the 1979 legislative election held on 2 December 1979:

Party		Votes	%	Seats
Social Democratic Party	PSD	67,598	54.10%	3
Socialist Party	PS	38,795	31.05%	2
Social Democratic Centre Party	CDS	9,518	7.62%	0
United People Alliance	APU	3,977	3.18%	0
Popular Democratic Union	UDP	2,257	1.81%	0
Portuguese Workers' Communist Party	PCTP	1,726	1.38%	0
Revolutionary Socialist Party	PSR	1,080	0.86%	0
Valid votes		124,951	100.00%	5
Blank votes		910	0.70%	
Rejected votes – other		4,233	3.25%	
Total polled		130,094	83.15%	
Registered electors		156,458		

The following candidates were elected: Mota Amaral (PSD); Germano Domingos (PSD); Jaime Gama (PS); António Ourique Mendes (PSD); and Francisco Cardoso Oliveira (PS).
