= Lara Martinho =

Portuguese politician from the Azores

Member of the Assembly of the Republic of Portugal
- In office 2015 – January 2022
- Parliamentary group: Portuguese Socialist Party (PS)
- Constituency: Azores

Personal details
- Born: Lara Fernandes Martinho; 6 November 1978 (age 47) New Bedford, Massachusetts, United States
- Party: Portuguese: Socialist Party (PS)
- Spouse: Sandro Rebelo Paim
- Education: NOVA University Lisbon

Lara Martinho (born 1978) is a Portuguese politician. A member of the Portuguese Socialist Party (PS), she was a member of the Assembly of the Republic, representing the Autonomous Region of the Azores, from 2015 to January 2022.

== Early life ==
Lara Fernandes Martinho was born on 6 November 1978 in New Bedford, Massachusetts in the USA. Her parents, who came from the Azores, had emigrated to America. However, after a decade, they decided to return to Portugal, when Lara was 5, to the family home on Terceira Island. She went to high school in Angra do Heroísmo on Terceira before moving to the Portuguese capital, Lisbon, to study at NOVA University Lisbon, where she graduated in Political Science and International Relations. She then completed a master's degree in international relations at the University of the Azores, with a thesis on the returnees to the Azores from the United States and Canada. She later obtained an MBA from the Universidade Autónoma de Lisboa, taking a course in Leadership Training at Harvard Kennedy School in the USA.

== Activities in the Azores ==
On returning to the Azores after completing her education, Martinho worked for the Angra do Heroísmo Chamber of Commerce between 2005 and 2012, being Secretary-General in her final two years there. She then became the Director of SDEA, the Society for Business Development in the Azores. She was also briefly a member of the Azores Legislative Assembly.

== Member of the National Assembly ==
In October 2015 Martinho became a member of the Assembly of the Republic, being re-elected in 2019. She was not a candidate in the 2022 elections. In the Assembly she was a member of the Committee on Foreign Affairs and Portuguese Communities and a member of the Committee on National Defence. She was President of the Parliamentary Group that promotes friendship between Portugal and the USA. She was also a Vice-President of the Socialist Party's Parliamentary Group. Martinho's activities in the Assembly tended to concentrate on the Azores. She was successful in having the wartime Lajes Air Base, which is occupied by both Portuguese and US forces, certified for civilian use. This permitted commercial flights to Lajes Airport from other islands and from Lisbon. She was successful in addressing the use of houses no longer needed by the American forces. She supported the use of the islands for research purposes by the European Space Agency. She also campaigned for the American government to undertake decontamination of areas of Terceira polluted by US forces.
