= Miradouro das Veredas =

Monument on the island Terceira

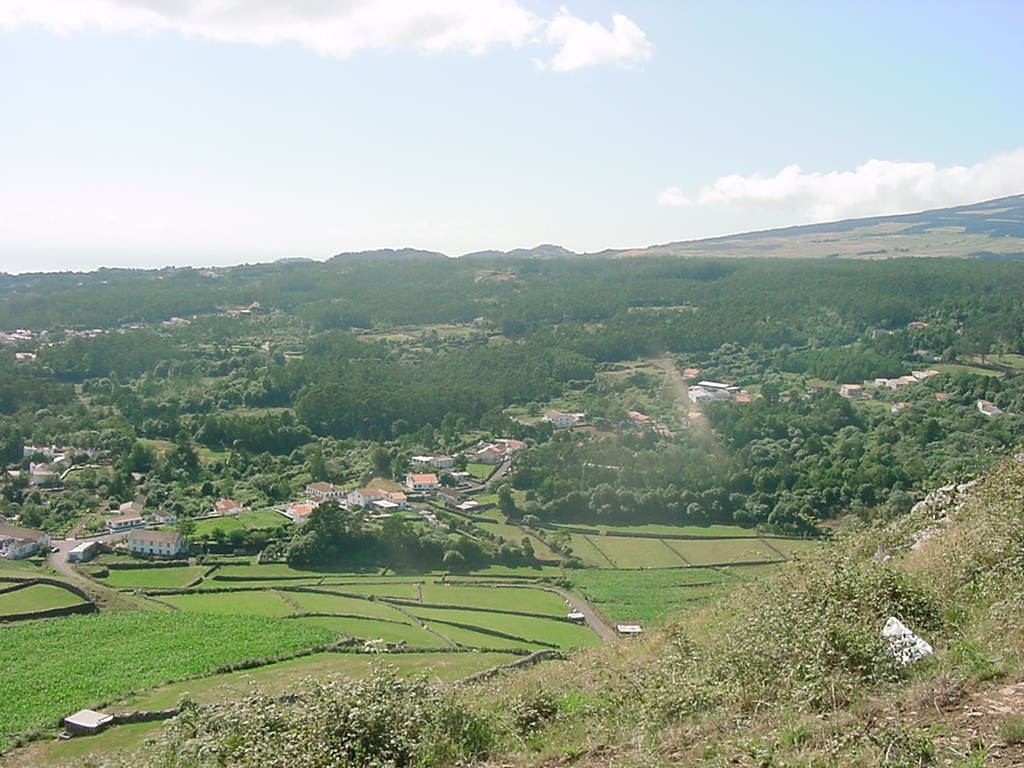
Miradouro das Veredas, view of the civil parish of Terra Chã

Miradouro das Veredas is a monument in the Azores. It is located in Angra do Heroísmo, on the island of Terceira.
