= José Mendes Melo Alves =

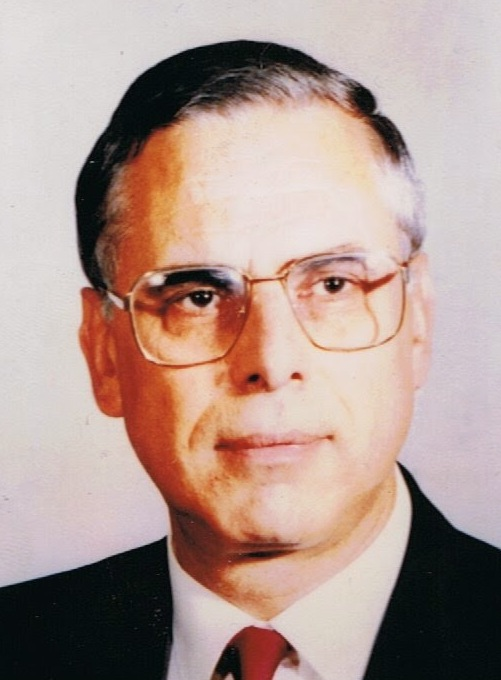
José Mendes Melo Alves

José Mendes Melo Alves (Doze Ribeiras, 12 November 1936 — Angra do Heroísmo, 13 March 1991) was an Azorean Politician who, in addition to other positions, was a member of the Junta Regional dos Açores and the Azores Regional Government and Presidency, elected to the Legislative Assembly of the Azores and the Assembly of the Republic (Portugal).

== Biography ==
José Mendes Melo Alves was born in Doze Ribeiras, a rural parish on the west side of Terceira Island. He attended the Liceu Nacional de Angra do Heroísmo, and went on to study law at the University of Coimbra, having graduated with a Licentiate degree in 1960.

When he finished his degree he returned home, where he took on the position of secretary of the Civil Government of the Autonomous District of Angra do Heroísmo, which he held until the extinction of the District in 1975 as a result of the creation of the Junta Regional dos Açores. In 1976, with the creation of the administration of the autonomous region he became a lawyer with the Regional Secretary of Public Administration.

During the Carnation Revolution of 25 April 1974 he sided with the autonomists who founded the party Partido Popular Democrático in the Azores. He actively participated in the writing of the Provisional Statutes of the Azorean Autonomy, "Estatuto Provisório de Autonomia dos Açores" in Portuguese, created under the Junta Regional dos Açores.

His career in the Partido Popular Democrático, later renamed Partido Social Democrata included being a member of the Political Commission and Chair of the Congress. In his last years, he was part of a critical group named Grupo da Terceira.

He was a member of the I Governo Regional dos Açores (1976-1980), as Regional Secretary of Public Administration with the responsibility of installing the autonomous administration of the region and the dissolution of the administrative organs of the Estado Novo (Portugal) in the Azores. He remained as the Regional Secretary of Public Administration in 1980, as a member of the II Governo Regional dos Açores. He left the executive branch in 1982 to become a member of the Legislative Assembly of the Azores.

He was elected by the Azores to the Assembly of the Republic (Portugal) in the IV e V legislatures.
