= Quinta da Boa Hora =

Estate of Boa Hora
- Quinta da Boa Hora
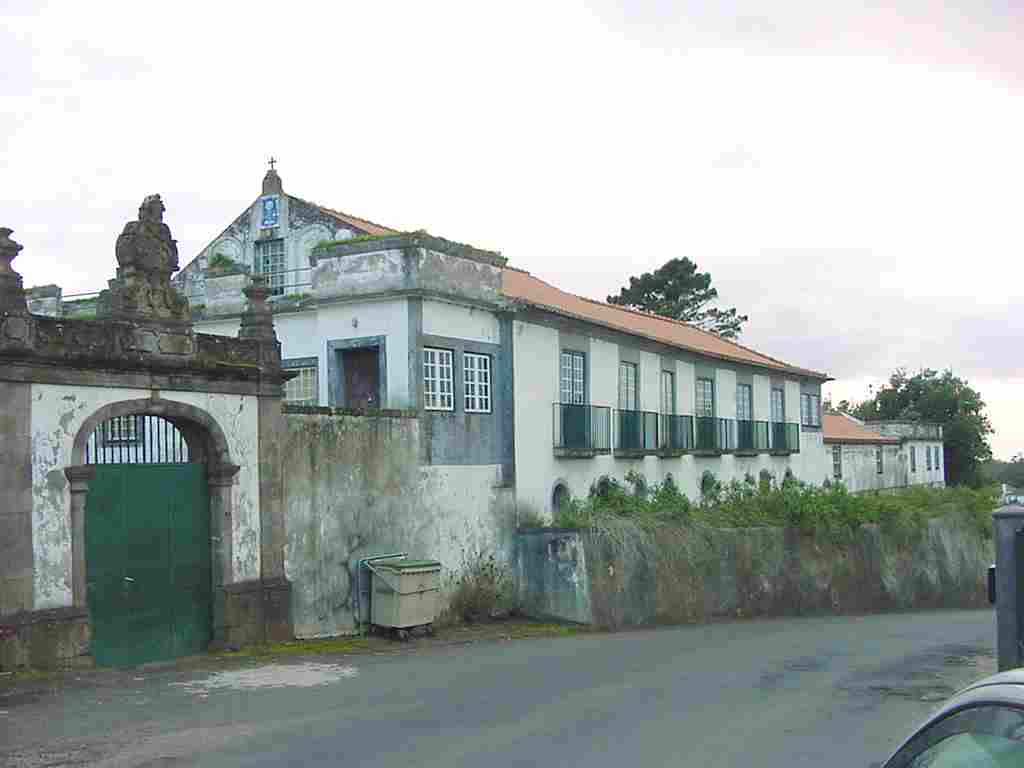
- A lateral view of the two story manorhouse of the estate along the roadway in Terra Chã

General information
- Type: Estate
- Architectural style: Baroque
- Location: Terra Chã, Portugal
- Opened: fl. 18th Century
- Owner: Portuguese Republic

Technical details
- Material: Basalt

The Estate of Boa Hora (Portuguese: Quinta da Boa Hora) is an agricultural property and manor house in the civil parish of Terra Chã, municipality of Angra do Heroísmo, in the Portuguese archipelago of the Azores.

== History ==
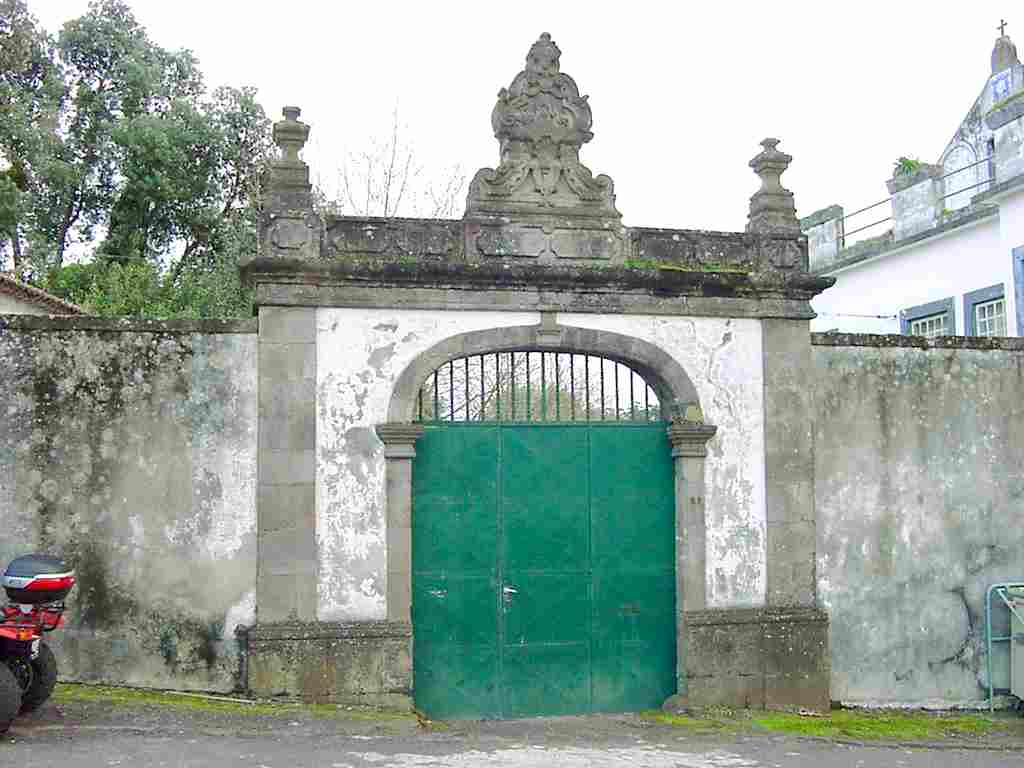
The estate's main gate with the sculpted pinnacle of the Barcelos family

For many centuries the estate was the personal residence of the Barcelos dynasty, a family of landed gentry and rich merchants.

It was the home of Isidro Barcelos Bettencourt, a Portuguese politician and party member of the PNR Partido Nacional Republicano (National Republican Party) in Angra do Heroísmo, and functionary of the Portuguese government.

== Architecture ==
The manorhouse is a large two-story building or considerable dimensions, with patio and garden (oriented to the east) containing various exotic plants of considerable dimensions and age. The buildings also include a private chapel.

This signeurial building, with austere facade, is also marked by various flourishes, including the obvious pinnacle over the main gate of sculpted stone.
