= Francisco César =

Portuguese politician (born 1978)

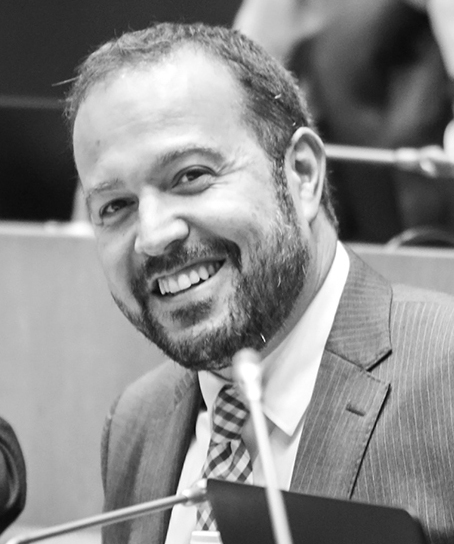

Member of the Assembly of the Republic
- Incumbent
- Assumed office 29 March 2022
- Constituency: Azores

Member of the Legislative Assembly of the Azores
- In office 19 October 2008 – 29 March 2022

Personal details
- Born: Francisco Miguel Vital Gomes do Vale César; 11 November 1978 (age 47) Lisbon, Portugal
- Party: Socialist Party
- Domestic partner: Rafaela Teixeira
- Children: 1
- Parent: Carlos César (father)
- Education: Technical University of Lisbon

Francisco Miguel Vital Gomes do Vale César (born 11 November 1978) is a Portuguese politician, who currently is the leader of the Socialist Party in the Azores. He is also a member of the Assembly of the Republic since 2022 and is the son of the current president of the Socialist Party and former president of the Regional Government of the Azores, Carlos César.
