= José Pacheco (Portuguese politician) =

Portuguese politician (born 1971)

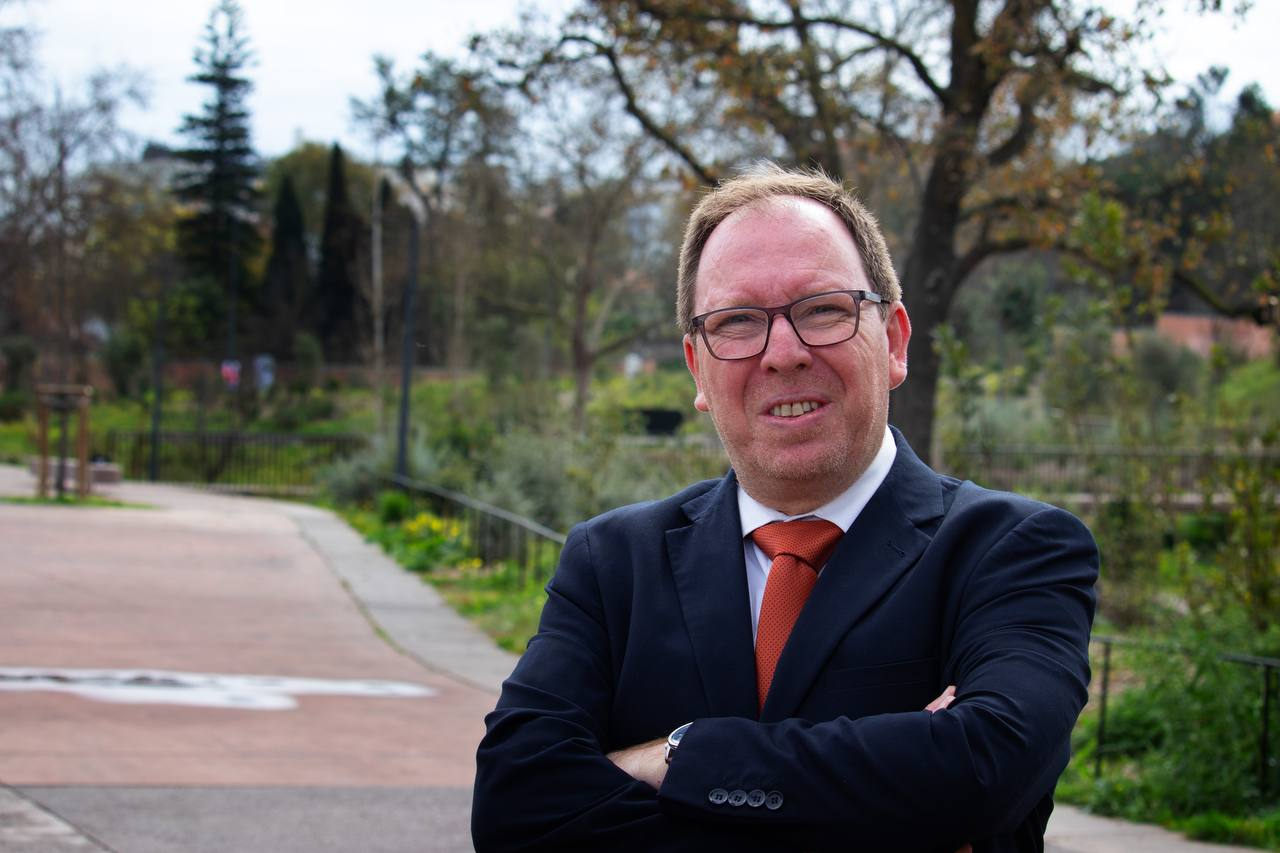
- Pacheco in 2020

Member of the Legislative Assembly of the Azores
- Incumbent
- Assumed office 16 November 2020
- Constituency: São Miguel

Personal details
- Born: José Eduardo da Cunha Pacheco; 4 February 1971 (age 55) Azores, Portugal
- Party: Chega (2019–present)
- Other political affiliations: CDS - People's Party (2004–2019)

José Eduardo da Cunha Pacheco (born 4 February 1971) is a Portuguese politician from the Azores. He is the president of the Chega party in the Azores, vice-president of the party at large and a deputy in the Legislative Assembly of the Azores. He was previously a member of the CDS - People's Party.

== Early life and career ==
Pacheco was born on 4 February 1971 in Azores. Pacheco joined the CDS-Azores in 2004 and was elected as a municipal councilor in Lagoa and later as a deputy in the Assembly.

He subsequently switched his affiliation to Chega after meeting with Diogo Pacheco de Amorim who was head of regions for the party. For the 2020 Azorean regional election, Pacheco was placed first on the list for Chega and elected to the Assembly. Due to an internal political dispute, former chairman Carlos Furtado left the party and Pacheco assumed the role as the sole deputy of the party in the Azores and became chairman in the Azores. In November 2021 the Social Democratic Party leader, Rui Rio, stated he was against a post-electoral agreement with CHEGA and would give up forming a government if it included the party. Party chairman of CHEGA, André Ventura, stated he would withdraw CHEGA from being a part of the parliament - of which Pachecho was still the sole CHEGA deputy in - due to its parliamentary incidence agreement because of the ruling governance coalition of the Azores that included PSD, CDS-PP, PPM. Pachecho later stated that after conversing with Ventura, he was given approval to sustain the party and to give the ruling coalition "a final chance" in a reversal of Ventura's previous statements. In 2022, Pacheco became a vice-president of Chega.
