= António Lima =

Portuguese politician

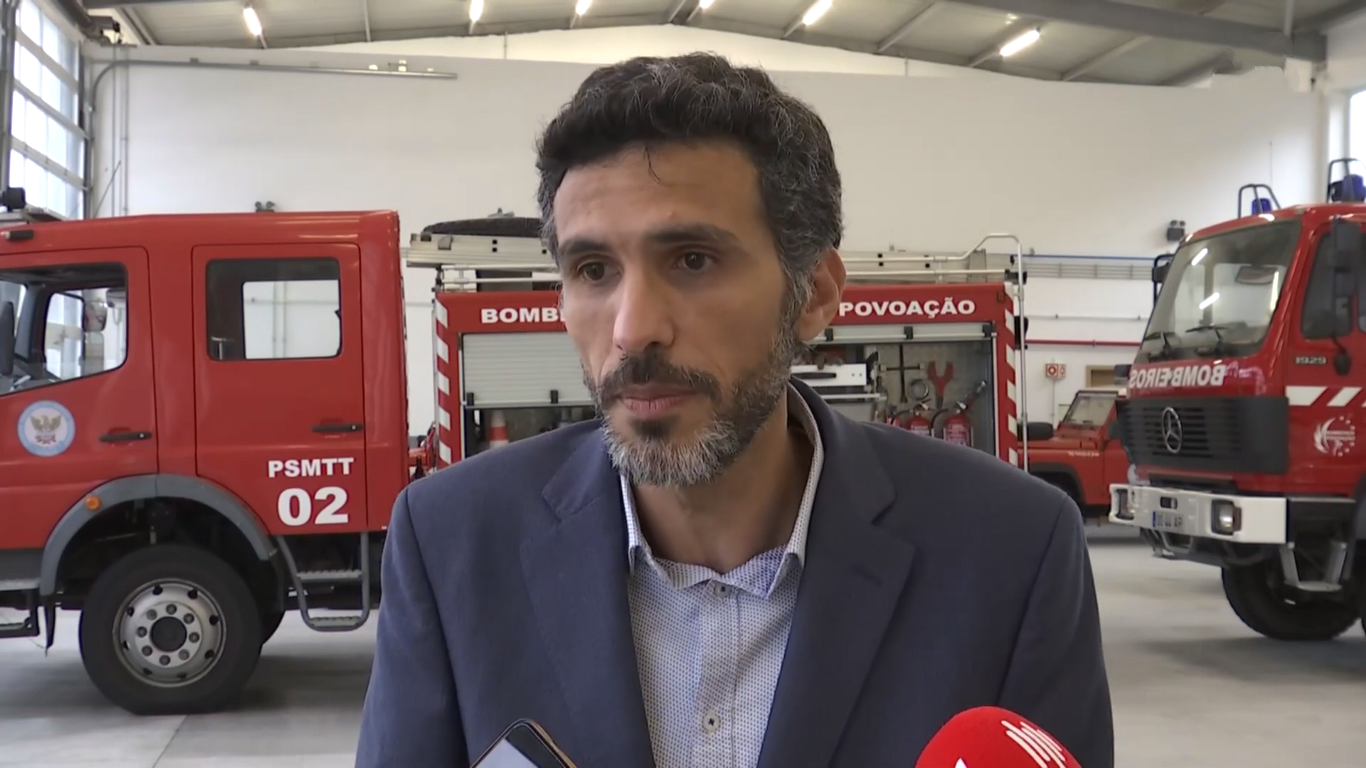

Member of the Legislative Assembly of the Azores
- Incumbent
- Assumed office 4 February 2024
- Constituency: Compensatory list
- In office 3 October 2017 – 4 February 2024
- Constituency: São Miguel

Personal details
- Born: António Manuel Raposo Lima; 18 March 1981 (age 45) Azores, Portugal
- Party: Left Bloc

António Manuel Raposo Lima (born 18 March 1981) is a Portuguese politician from the Azores. He is a deputy in the Legislative Assembly of the Azores elected by the Left Bloc in 2017.
