= Doze Ribeiras =

- Civil parish
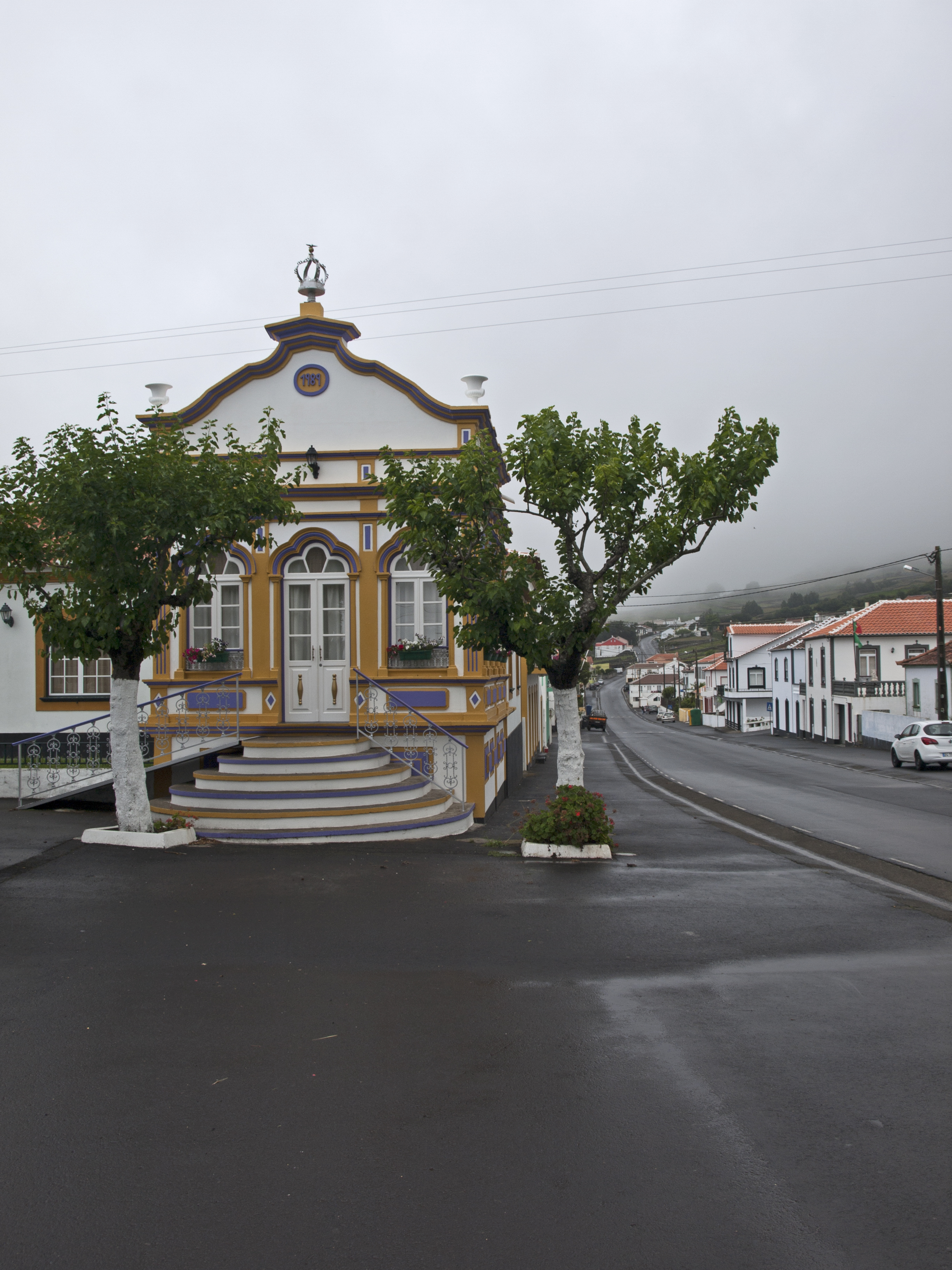
- Império do Espírito Santo

- Location in the Azores Doze Ribeiras (Terceira)
- Coordinates: 38°42′58″N 27°21′39″W
- Country: Portugal
- Auton. region: Azores
- Island: Terceira
- Municipality: Angra do Heroísmo

Area
  - Total: 10.41 km^{2} (4.02 sq mi)
- Elevation: 237 m (778 ft)

Population (2011)
  - Total: 513
  - Density: 49.3/km^{2} (128/sq mi)
- Time zone: UTC−01:00 (AZOT)
  - Summer (DST): UTC+00:00 (AZOST)
- Postal code: 9700 – 339
- Area code: 292
- Patron: São Jorge

Doze Ribeiras (pronounced [ˈdo.zɨ ʁi.ˈbɐj.ɾɐʃ]) is a civil parish in the municipality of Angra do Heroísmo on the island of Terceira in Portuguese archipelago of the Azores. The population in 2011 was 513, in an area of 10.41 km^{2} (4.02 sq mi).

== Architecture ==
The traditional architecture of Doze Ribeiras resembles much of the rural homes of the western Terceira region, generally constructed around a single floor, many white-washed homes, bordered by multi-coloured trim at the corners, doors and windows.

- Church of São Jorge (Portuguese: Igreja Paroquial de Doze Ribeiras/Igreja de São Jorge)
- Império of Holy Spirit of Terreiro Portuguese: Império do Espírito Santo das Doze Ribeiras/Império do Terreiro
