= Curbelo =

Curbelo is a Spanish surname. It also has Portuguese variations, with the spellings Corvelo, Curvelo, Curvello. The Curbelo surname is found in the Canary Islands in the 18th century and it spread from Lanzarote to the New World. It is most common in Uruguay and Cuba.

Notable people with the surname include:

== Curbelo ==
- Alejandro Curbelo (born 1973), Uruguayan soccer player
- André Curbelo (born 2001), Puerto Rican basketball player for the University of Illinois at Urbana–Champaign
- Carlos Curbelo (born 1980), American politician
- Carlos Curbelo (footballer) (born 1954), Uruguayan-French soccer player
- Cecilia Curbelo (born 1975), Uruguayan journalist
- Gaston Curbelo (born 1976), French soccer player
- Gonzalo Curbelo (born 1987), Uruguayan soccer player
- Jorge Curbelo (born 1981), Uruguayan soccer player
- José Curbelo (1917–2012), Cuban pianist and bandleader
- Juan Ramón Curbelo (born 1979), Uruguayan soccer player
- Juan Curbelo (Texan settler) (1680–1760), Spanish politician, mayor of San Antonio, Texas
- Nestor Curbelo (born 1952), Uruguayan historian
- Silvia Álvarez Curbelo (born 1940), Puerto Rican historian and writer
- Silvia Curbelo, Cuban-American poet and writer

== Corvelo / Curvelo / Curvello ==
- Antônio Corvelo de Ávila, Portuguese priest and eponym of the Brazilian city of Curvelo
- Isabel de Castro Curvello de Herédia (born 1966), Portuguese businesswoman and socialite
- João Corvelo (born 1981), Azores-born Portuguese veterinary physician and politician
