= 2020 Azorean regional election =

- 25 October 2020

57 seats to the Legislative Assembly of the Azores 29 seats needed for a majority
- Opinion polls
- Turnout: 45.4% ▲4.6 pp
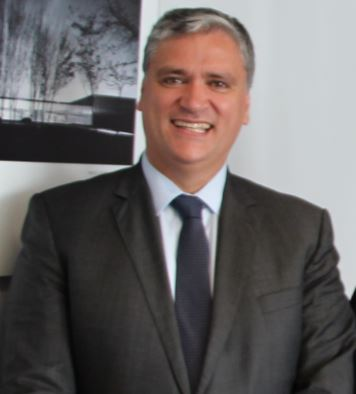

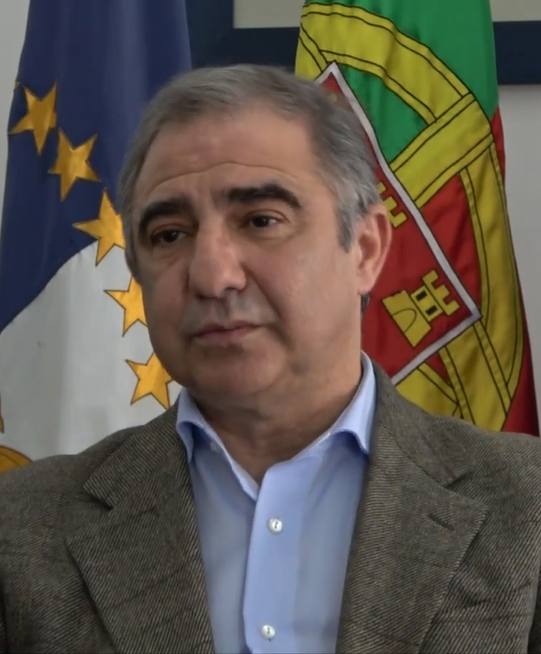

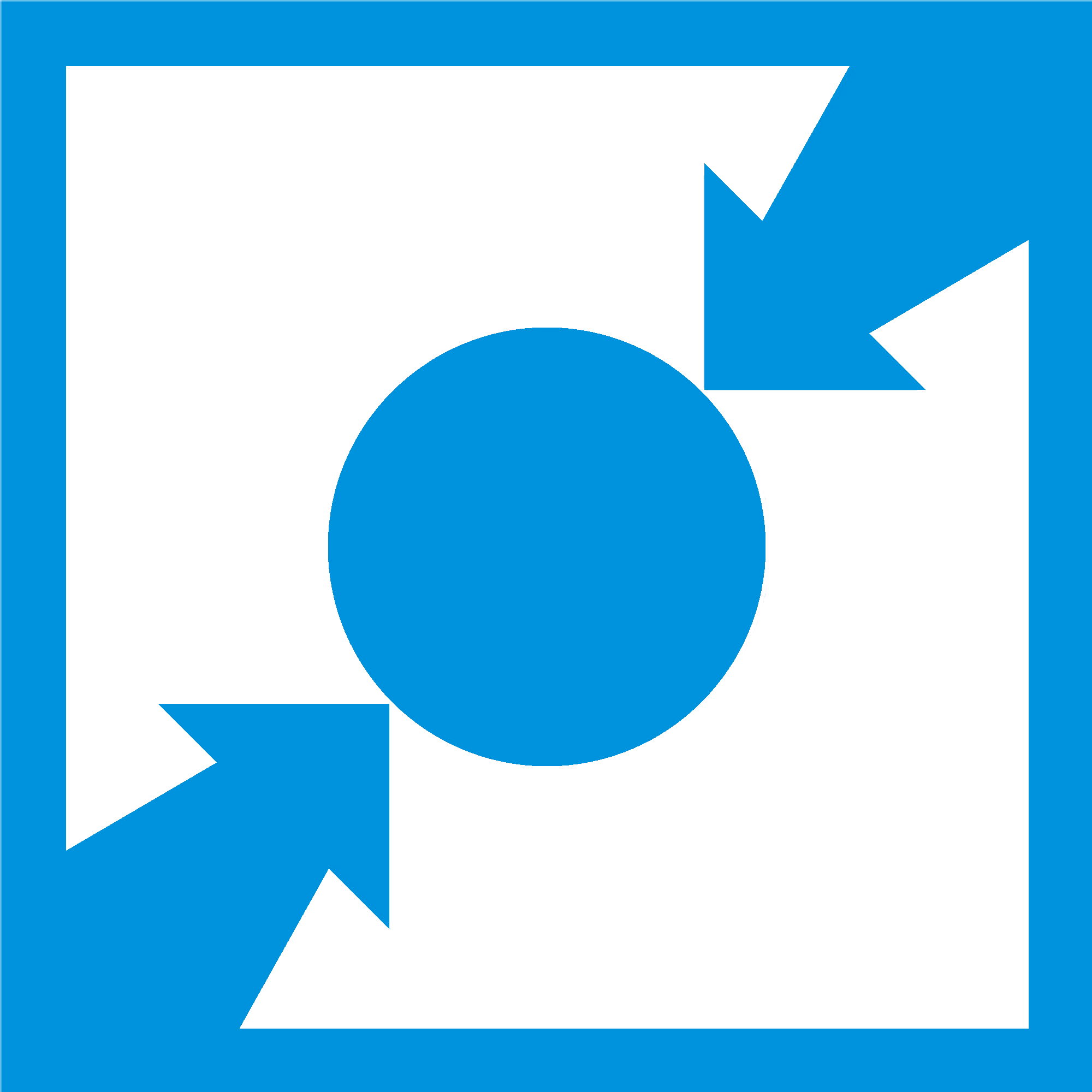

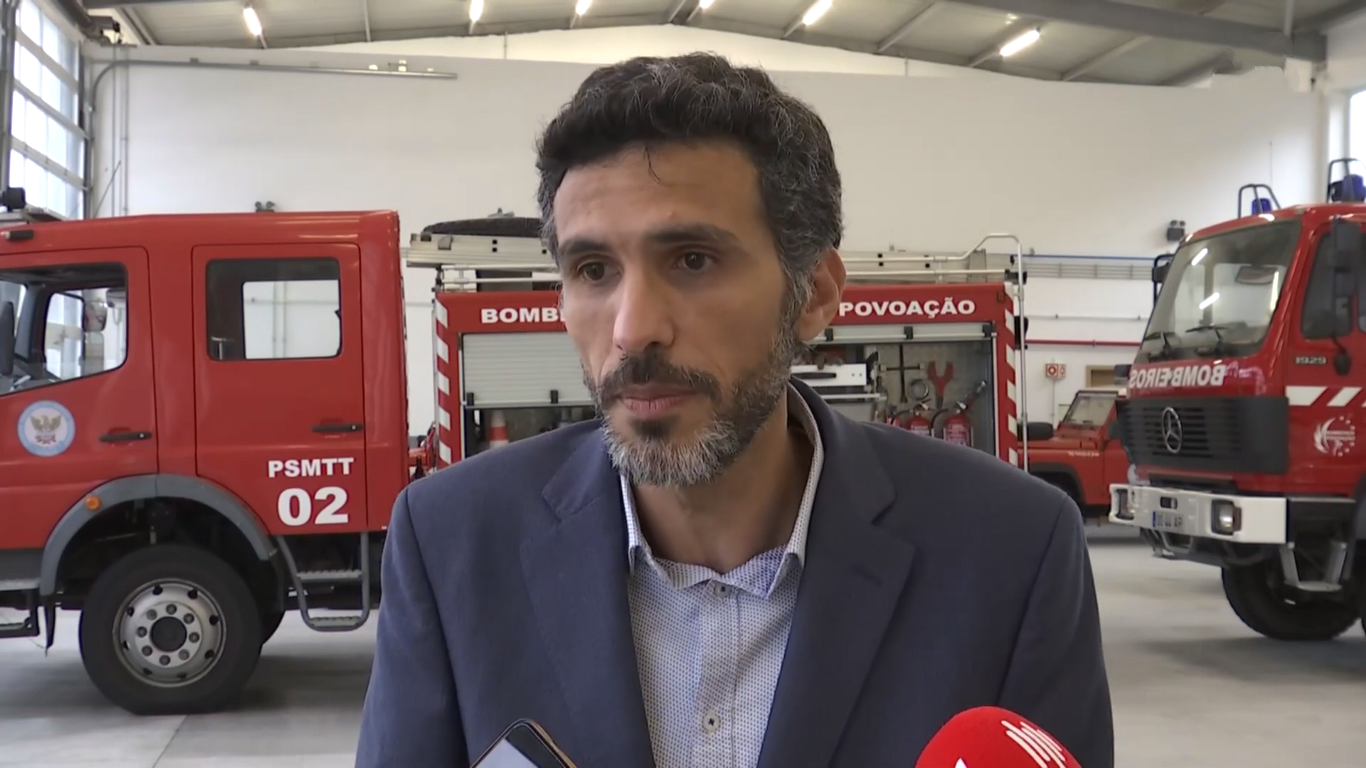

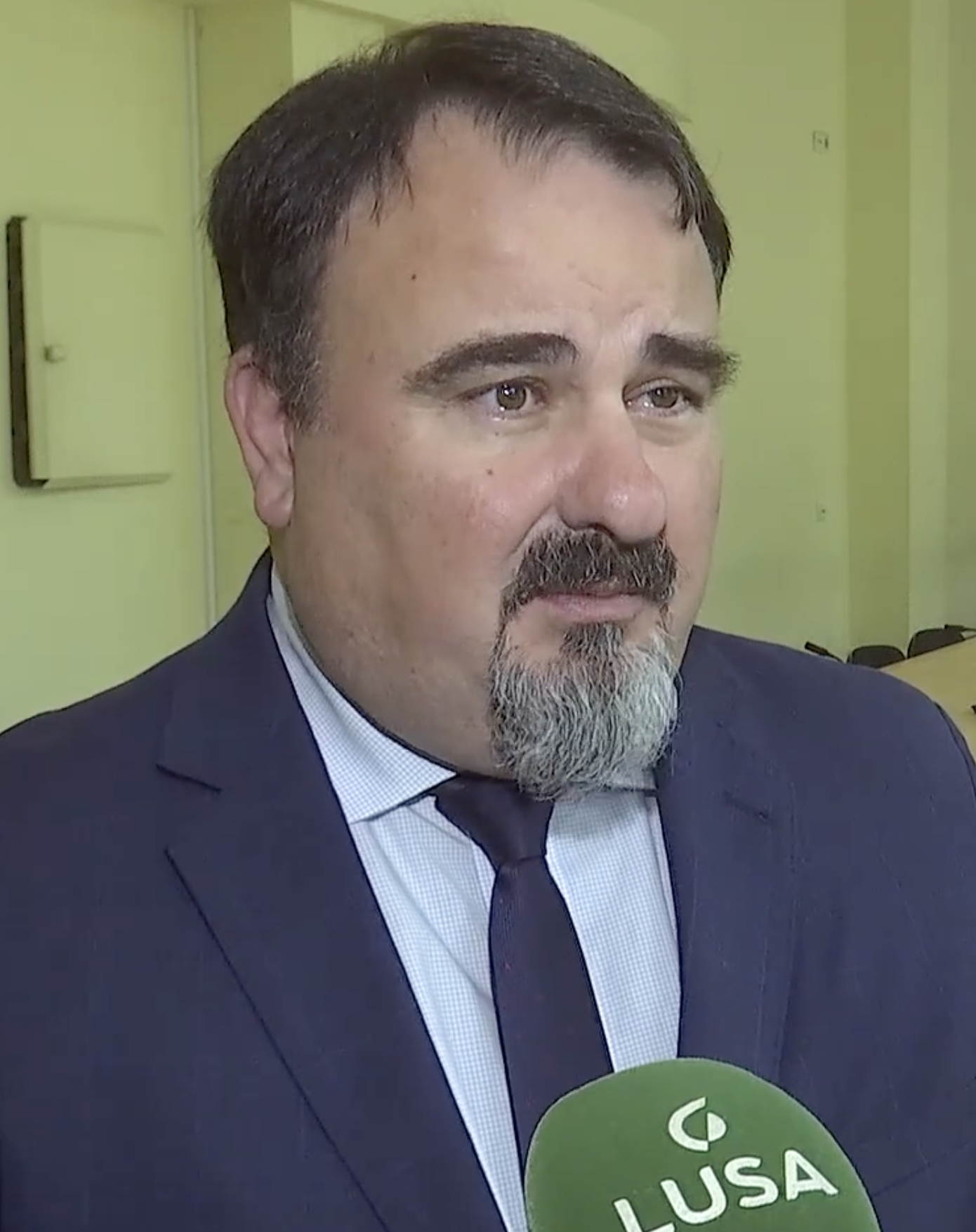

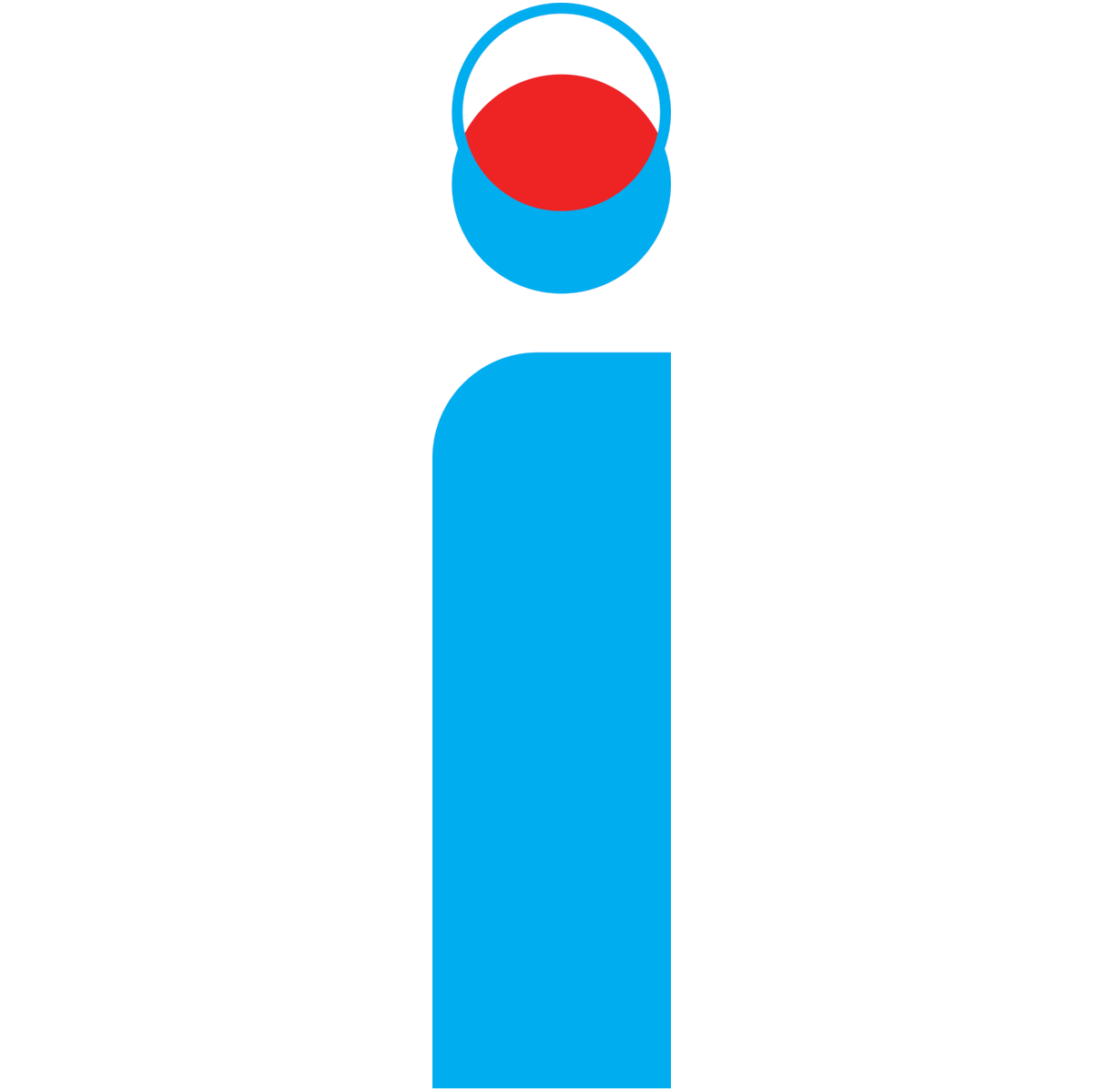

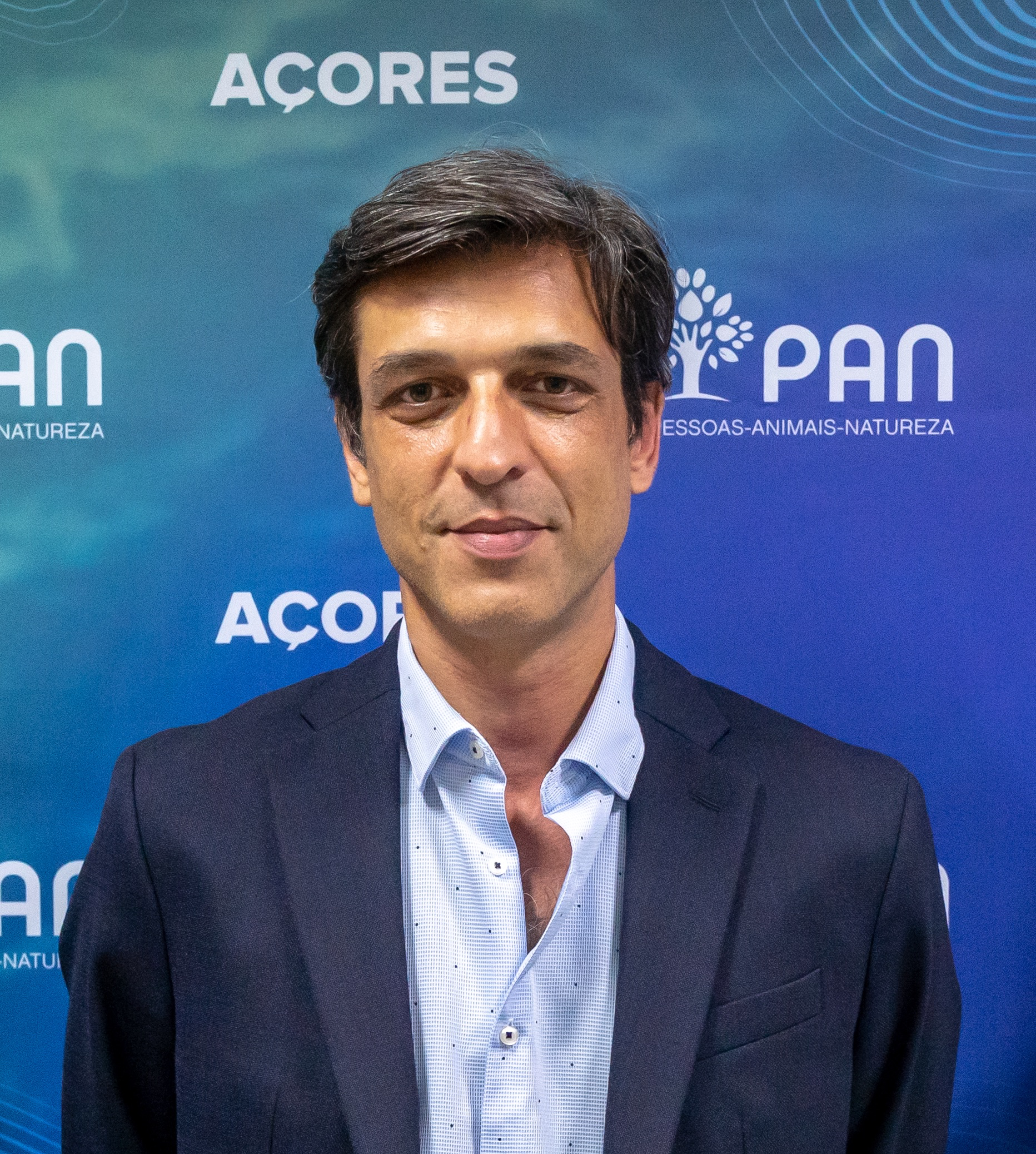

	First party	Second party	Third party
Leader	Vasco Cordeiro	José Manuel Bolieiro	Artur Lima
Party	PS	PSD	CDS–PP
Leader since	8 October 2011	14 December 2019	March 2007
Leader's seat	São Miguel	São Miguel	Terceira
Last election	30 seats, 46.4%	19 seats, 30.9%	4 seats, 7.2%
Seats won	25	21	3
Seat change	▼5	▲2	▼1
Popular vote	40,703	35,094	5,739
Percentage	39.1%	33.7%	5.5%
Swing	▼7.3 pp	▲2.8 pp	▼1.6 pp
	Fourth party	Fifth party	Sixth party
Leader	Carlos Furtado	António Lima	Paulo Estêvão
Party	CH	BE	PPM
Leader since	2019	14 July 2018	2000
Leader's seat	São Miguel	São Miguel	Corvo
Last election	Did not contest	2 seats, 3.7%	1 seat, 0.93%
Seats won	2	2	2
Seat change	▲2	0	▲1
Popular vote	5,262	3,962	2,530
Percentage	5.1%	3.8%	2.4%
Swing	New party	▲0.2 pp	▲1.5 pp
	Seventh party	Eighth party	Ninth party
Leader	Nuno Barata	Pedro Neves	João Corvelo
Party	IL	PAN	PCP
Alliance			CDU
Leader since	2019	2019	2016
Leader's seat	Compensatory list	Compensatory list	Flores (lost)
Last election	Did not contest	0 seat, 1.4%	1 seats, 2.6%
Seats won	1	1	0
Seat change	▲1	▲1	▼1
Popular vote	2,012	2,005	1,741
Percentage	1.9%	1.9%	1.7%
Swing	New party	▲0.5 pp	▼0.9 pp
- Map showing island constituencies won by political parties
President before election
Vasco Cordeiro
PS
Elected President
José Manuel Bolieiro
PSD

The 2020 Azorean regional election was held on 25 October 2020, to determine the composition of the Legislative Assembly of the Autonomous Region of the Azores. All 57 members of the assembly were up for election.

The Socialist Party (PS) again won the most votes with 39 percent, but lost their majority against all predictions. The party won 25 seats, 5 seats fewer than in 2016 and 4 seats short of a majority. The Socialists' main opponent, the Social Democratic Party (PSD), made significant gains by winning almost 34 percent of the votes and 21 seats, two more than in 2016.

The CDS – People's Party (CDS-PP) was able to hold on to its status as the third biggest party in the region but lost almost 2 percent of the votes and one member on the regional parliament. Overall, CDS–PP got 5.5 percent of the votes and 3 seats. The Left Bloc (BE) was also able to hold on to their 2016 score, holding their 2 seats and winning a similar share of vote to that received in 2016, with 3.8 percent. The Unitary Democratic Coalition (CDU) was wiped out from the regional parliament by losing their sole member, elected in 2016, and polling just 1.7 percent of the votes.

The big surprise in the elections was the arrival of new parties, from left to right, in the Azores regional parliament. Chega (CH) polled at 5 percent of the votes and was able to elect 2 members to the regional parliament. People-Animals-Nature (PAN) also elected one MP as did the Liberal Initiative (IL). The new composition of the regional assembly gave the rightwing parties a majority over the left, with 29 against 28.

On election night, PSD leader José Manuel Bolieiro said the night was a historic one for democracy and the autonomous region. PS leader Vasco Cordeiro said the PS won the elections and should have a chance to form a government but acknowledged that the picture was challenging. In the days after the election, both PS and PSD started talks with parties to see if deals were possible.

On 2 November, PSD, CDS–PP and PPM announced they had reached an agreement to form a government. Shortly afterwards, Carlos Furtardo, the leader of Chega also announced the party would support a PSD/CDS–PP/PPM government in the regional parliament. Despite this announcement, there were divisions in Chega as the party's national leader, André Ventura, said no deal had been made with the Social Democrats and that the order was to not support the PSD led coalition. However, a few days later, on 6 November, both parties reached an agreement after Chega dropped several of their demands.

On the following day, 7 November, IL announced it had also reached an agreement with PSD for parliamentary support. Thus the government would be formed by a coalition of PSD, CDS-PP and PPM (26 MPs) with parliamentary support of Chega (2) and IL (1), totalizing a majority of 29 out of 57 seats in the parliament.

On that same day, the Representative of the Republic in the Azores, Pedro Catarino, after hearing all parties represented in the regional parliament, appointed José Manuel Bolieiro as President of the Regional Government and asked him to form a government. On 24 November, José Manuel Bolieiro and his cabinet were sworn in to office.

The turnout in these elections increased compared to the previous one, with 45.4 percent of voters casting a ballot, compared with the record-low 40.9 percent in the 2016 elections.

== Background ==
=== Leadership changes and challenges ===
==== Social Democratic Party ====
After the defeat of the PSD in the 2016 regional election, then party leader Duarte Freitas remained in office until resigning in July 2018, for personal reasons. He called a leadership ballot for 29 September 2018. Two candidates were on the ballot: Incumbent mayor of Ribeira Grande Alexandre Gaudêncio, and Pedro Nascimento Cabral. Gaudêncio was elected with 61 percent of the votes.

Ballot: 29 September 2018
Candidate	Votes	%
Alexandre Gaudêncio	1,716	60.9
Pedro Nascimento Cabral	1,058	37.5
Blank/Invalid ballots	46	1.6
Turnout	2,820	53.80

One year later, in October 2019, Gaudêncio announced his resignation, in the aftermath of a Judiciary Police investigation into suspected irregularities in public contracts and urban development while as mayor of Ribeira Grande. A leadership ballot was called for 14 December 2019 and only one candidate presented himself: José Manuel Bolieiro, by then the incumbent mayor of Ponta Delgada. Boleiro was elected with almost 99 percent of the votes.

Ballot: 14 December 2019
Candidate	Votes	%
José Manuel Bolieiro	1,526	98.5
Blank/Invalid ballots	24	1.5
Turnout	1,550	–

== Electoral system ==
The 57 members of the Azores regional parliament are elected through a proportional system in which the 9 islands elect a number of MPs proportional to the number of registered voters. MPs are allocated by using the D'Hondt method. 5 members are also elected for a Compensation constituency. Current distribution of MPs by constituency:

Constituency	Total MPs	Registered voters
Corvo	2	337
Faial	4	13,019
Flores	3	3,119
Graciosa	3	3,936
Pico	4	13,613
Santa Maria	3	5,393
São Jorge	3	8,710
São Miguel	20	127,947
Terceira	10	52,498
Compensation	5	—N/a
Total	57	228,572

== Parties ==
The table below lists parties represented in the Legislative Assembly of the Azores in the term between 2016 and 2020.

Name		Ideology	Leader	2016 result	
Name		Ideology	Leader	%	Seats
PS	Socialist Party; Partido Socialista	Social democracy	Vasco Cordeiro	46.4%	30 / 57
PPD/PSD	Social Democratic Party; Partido Social Democrata	Liberal conservatism	José Manuel Bolieiro	30.9%	19 / 57
CDS–PP	CDS – People's Party; Centro Democrático Social – Partido Popular	Christian Democracy	Artur Lima	7.2%	4 / 57
B.E.	Left Bloc; Bloco de Esquerda	Democratic socialism	António Lima	3.7%	2 / 57
PCP	Portuguese Communist Party; Partido Comunista Português	Communism	João Corvelo	2.6% (Note: The Portuguese Communist Party (PCP) and the Ecologist Party "The Greens" (PEV) contested the 2016 election in a coalition called Unitary Democratic Coalition and won a combined 2.6% of the vote and elected one MP to parliament.)	1 / 57
PPM	People's Monarchist Party; Partido Popular Monárquico	Monarchism	Paulo Estêvâo	0.9%	1 / 57

=== Parties running in the election ===
14 lists were on the ballot for the 2020 Azorean regional election, 13 parties and one coalition only in Corvo. The parties that contested the election and their lead candidates, were: (alphabetically ordered)

- Alliance (A), Paulo Silva
- Left Bloc (BE), António Lima
- Unitary Democratic Coalition (CDU), João Corvelo
- CDS – People's Party (CDS-PP), Artur Lima
- Chega (CH), Carlos Furtado
- Liberal Initiative (IL), Nuno Barata
- LIVRE (L), José Manuel Azevedo
- Earth Party (MPT), Pedro Soares Pimenta
- People-Animals-Nature (PAN), Pedro Neves
- Portuguese Workers' Communist Party (PCTP/MRPP), José Afonso Loures
- Social Democratic Party (PSD), José Manuel Bolieiro
- People's Monarchist Party (PPM), Paulo Estêvão
- Socialist Party (PS), Vasco Cordeiro
- People's Monarchist Party/CDS – People's Party More Corvo (PPM/CDS-PP), (Note: List only running in Corvo Island.) Paulo Estêvão

== Campaign period ==
=== Party slogans ===
Party or alliance	Original slogan	English translation	Refs
PS	« Prá frente é que é o caminho » « Os Açores precisam do seu voto »	"Forward is the way" "The Azores needs your vote"	
PSD	« Confiança »	"Trust"	
CDS–PP	« A escolha certa na defesa dos seus direitos »	"The right choice in defending your rights"	
BE	« Novas Políticas, Melhor Futuro »	"New Policies, Better Future"	
CDU	« Projecto de futuro para os Açores »	"Project of future for the Azores"	
PAN	« Dar asas a uma nova visão »	"Give wings to a new vision"	
IL	« Vamos liberalizar os Açores »	"Lets liberalize the Azores"	
CH	« O CHEGA é a tua voz. »	"CHEGA is your voice."	

=== Candidates' debates ===
2020 Azorean regional election debates
Date	Organisers	Moderator(s)	P Present A Absent invitee N Non-invitee						
Date	Organisers	Moderator(s)	PS Cordeiro	PSD Bolieiro	CDS–PP Lima	BE A. Lima	CDU Corvelo	PPM Estêvão	Refs
2 Oct	RTP Açores	Herberto Gomes	P	P	P	P	P	P	
5 Oct	RTP Açores	João Simas	P	N	N	N	P	N	
6 Oct	RTP Açores	João Simas	N	N	N	P	P	P	
7 Oct	RTP Açores	João Simas	N	P	N	N	N	P	
8 Oct	RTP Açores	João Simas	N	N	P	N	N	P	
9 Oct	RTP Açores	João Simas	P	N	N	P	N	N	
10 Oct	RTP Açores	João Simas	N	P	N	N	P	N	
11 Oct	RTP Açores	João Simas	N	N	P	N	P	N	
12 Oct	RTP Açores	João Simas	N	N	N	P	N	P	
13 Oct	RTP Açores	João Simas	P	P	N	N	N	N	
14 Oct	RTP Açores	João Simas	N	N	P	P	N	N	
15 Oct	RTP Açores	João Simas	N	N	N	N	P	P	
16 Oct	RTP Açores	João Simas	N	P	N	P	N	N	
17 Oct	RTP Açores	João Simas	P	N	N	N	P	N	
18 Oct	RTP Açores	João Simas	N	P	P	N	N	N	
19 Oct	RTP Açores	João Simas	P	N	N	N	N	P	

== Opinion polls ==
Exit poll

Polling firm/Link	Fieldwork date	Sample size	TO	PS	PSD	CDS–PP	BE	CDU	PAN	PPM	CH	IL	O	Lead
2020 regional elections	25 Oct 2020	—N/a	45.4	39.1; 25	33.7; 21	5.5; 3	3.8; 2	1.7; 0	1.9; 1	2.4; 2	5.1; 2	1.9; 1	4.9; 0	5.4
UCP–CESOP	25 Oct 2020	?	?	37–41; 26/30	32–36; 19/22	3–6; 1/3	2–5; 1/2	1–2; 0/2	2–3; 1	1–2; 1	3–6; 1/3	1–2; 0/1	—N/a	5
UCP–CESOP	17–18 Oct 2020	3,159	?	45; 28/32	32; 18/22	3; 1/3	3; 0/2	2; 0/1	2; 0/1	1; 1	3; 0/2	2; 0/1	7; 0	13
2019 legislative election	6 Oct 2019	—N/a	36.5	40.1	30.2	4.8	8.0	2.5	2.7	0.5	0.9	0.7	9.6	9.9
2019 EP elections	26 May 2019	—N/a	18.7	40.8	20.7	6.5	7.5	2.5	3.7	1.2	—N/a	0.5	16.6	20.1
2017 local elections	1 Oct 2017	—N/a	53.5	45.0	41.7	3.2	1.5	1.9	0.6	—N/a	—N/a	—N/a	6.1	3.3
2016 regional elections	16 Oct 2016	—N/a	40.8	46.4; 30	30.9; 19	7.2; 4	3.7; 2	2.6; 1	1.4; 0	0.9; 1	—N/a	—N/a	6.9; 0	15.5

== Voter turnout ==
The table below shows voter turnout throughout election day.

Turnout	Time								
Turnout	11:00			16:00			19:00		
Turnout	2016	2020	±	2016	2020	±	2016	2020	±
Total	7.47%	9.16%	▲1.69 pp	29.29%	32.68%	▲3.39 pp	40.85%	45.41%	▲4.56 pp

== Results ==
=== Regional summary ===
Summary of the 25 October 2020 Legislative Assembly of Azores elections results
Parties	Votes	%	±pp swing	MPs				
Parties	Votes	%	±pp swing	2016	2020	±	%	±
Socialist	40,703	39.14	▼7.3	30	25	▼5	43.86	▼8.7
Social Democratic	35,094	33.74	▲2.8	19	21	▲2	36.84	▲3.5
People's	5,739	5.52	▼1.7	4	3	▼1	5.26	▼1.7
Chega	5,262	5.06	—N/a	—N/a	2	—N/a	3.51	—N/a
Left Bloc	3,962	3.81	▲0.1	2	2	0	3.51	0.0
People's Monarchist	2,415	2.32	▲1.4	0	1	▲1	1.75	▲1.7
Liberal Initiative	2,012	1.93	—N/a	—N/a	1	—N/a	1.75	—N/a
People-Animals-Nature	2,005	1.93	▲0.4	0	1	▲1	1.75	▲1.7
Democratic Unity Coalition	1,741	1.67	▼0.9	1	0	▼1	0.00	▼1.7
Alliance	422	0.41	—N/a	—N/a	0	—N/a	0.00	—N/a
LIVRE	362	0.35	▲0.1	0	0	0	0.00	0.0
Earth	157	0.15	▼0.2	0	0	0	0.00	0.0
Portuguese Workers' Communist	144	0.14	▼0.2	0	0	0	0.00	0.0
More Corvo (PPM/CDS–PP)	115	0.11	▲0.0	1	1	0	1.75	0.0
Total valid	100,133	96.28	▲1.6	57	57	0	100.00	0.0
Blank ballots	2,618	2.52	▼0.4					
Invalid ballots	1,247	1.20	▼1.2					
Total	103,998	100.00						
Registered voters/turnout	229,002	45.41	▲4.6					
Source: Comissão Nacional de Eleições

Vote share
PS	39.14%
PSD	33.74%
CDS-PP	5.52%
CH	5.06%
BE	3.81%
PPM	2.32%
IL	1.93%
PAN	1.93%
CDU	1.67%
MC	0.11%
Others	1.05%
Blank/Invalid	3.72%

Parliamentary seats
PS	43.86%
PSD	36.84%
CDS-PP	5.26%
CH	3.51%
BE	3.51%
PPM	1.75%
IL	1.75%
PAN	1.75%
MC	1.75%

=== Results by constituency ===
Results of the 2020 election of the Legislative Assembly of Azores by constituency
Constituency	%	S	%	S	%	S	%	S	%	S	%	S	%	S	%	S	%	S	Total S
Constituency	PS		PSD		CDS-PP		CH		BE		PPM		IL		PAN		PPM/ CDS-PP		Total S
Corvo	35.2	1	22.3	-					0.0	-							40.1	1	2
Faial	30.3	2	41.0	2	6.0	-	3.0	-	3.6	-	2.6	-			1.5	-			4
Flores	30.0	1	28.3	1	11.7	-			3.9	-	18.2	1			1.4	-			3
Graciosa	47.4	2	41.6	1	1.3	-	1.5	-	1.1	-	3.5	-							3
Pico	44.8	2	36.5	2	4.5	-	3.6	-	1.9	-	0.6	-			1.5	-			4
Santa Maria	44.0	2	23.3	1	1.2	-	1.4	-	11.6	-	12.6	-							3
São Jorge	32.0	1	18.4	1	31.6	1	9.1	-	1.9	-	1.5	-	2.6	-					3
São Miguel	39.0	9	36.6	9	1.6	-	5.6	1	4.3	1	2.2	-	2.5	-	2.6	-			20
Terceira	41.3	5	28.5	4	9.5	1	5.4	-	3.2	-	0.8	-	2.9	-	1.5	-			10
Compensation		-		-		1		1		1		-		1		1			5
Total	39.1	25	33.7	21	5.5	3	5.1	2	3.8	2	2.3	1	1.9	1	1.9	1	0.1	1	57
Source: Azores Government

=== Maps ===
Most voted party by island.

Most voted party by municipality in the Azores.

== Aftermath ==
=== Government approval ===
With the loss of its majority, the PS tried to reach a deal with other parties but failed, as the PSD reached a deal for a minority coalition government with CDS – People's Party (CDS-PP) and the People's Monarchist Party (PPM), plus ensured the outside support of Chega and the Liberal Initiative. On 11 December 2020, the regional parliament approved José Manuel Boleiro's minority government, the first non-socialist Azorean regional government in 24 years:

2020 Motion of confidence José Manuel Bolieiro (PSD)
Ballot →	11 December 2020
Required majority →	Simple
Yes: • PSD (21); • CDS–PP (3); • PPM (2); • CH (2); • IL (1)	29 / 57
No: • PS (25); • BE (2); • PAN (1)	28 / 57
Abstentions	0 / 57
Absentees	0 / 57
Result →	Approved

=== Fall of the government ===
In March 2023, the Liberal Initiative removed its support from the PSD/CDS/PPM minority coalition, citing deep disagreements on policy and tensions between the minor parties within the coalition. On the budget vote for 2024, in late November 2023, the coalition lost the support of their outside supporters, Liberal Initiative and Chega, and the budget fell. Bolieiro tried to present a second budget, but after meeting with President Marcelo Rebelo de Sousa, he dropped the idea and asked for early elections. Shortly after, early elections were called for 4 February 2024.
