= 2016 Azorean regional election =

Election in Portugal

- 16 October 2016

57 seats to the Legislative Assembly of Azores 29 seats needed for a majority
- Opinion polls
- Turnout: 40.8% ▼7.0 pp
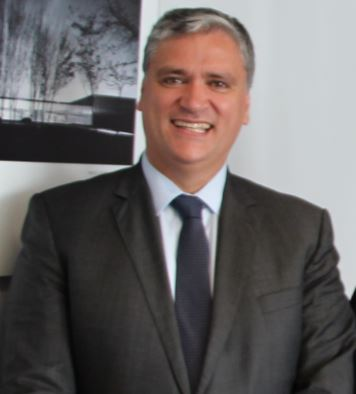

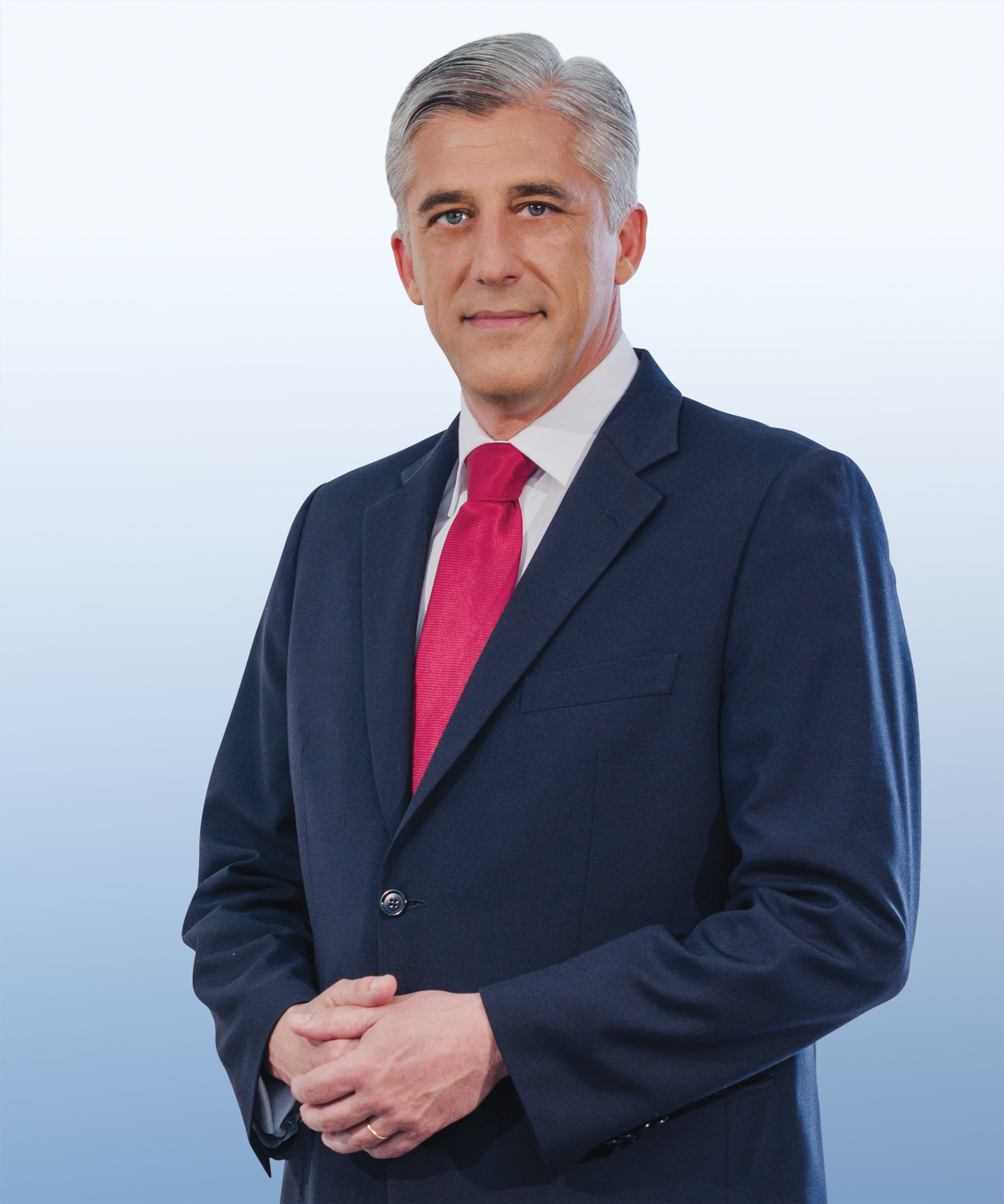

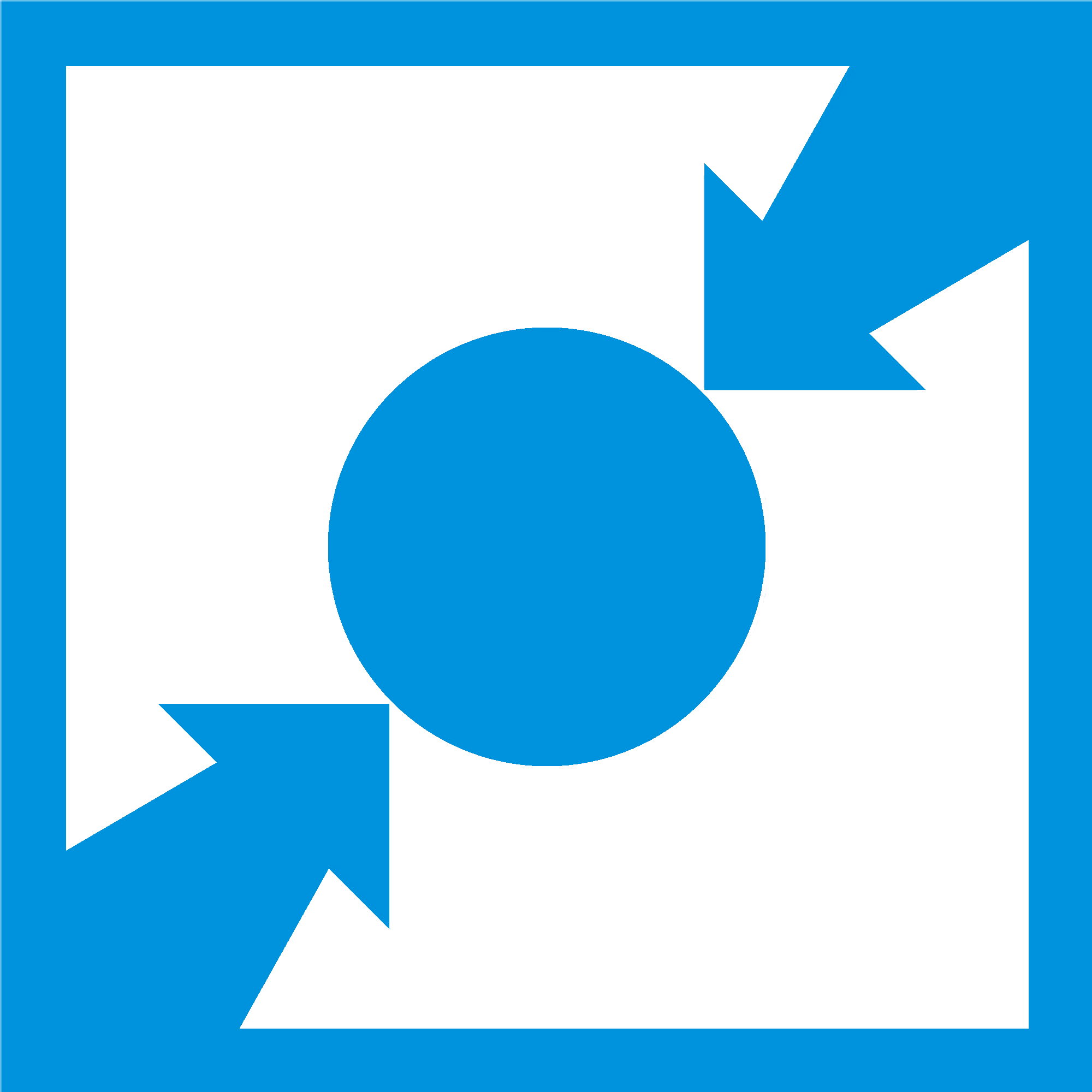

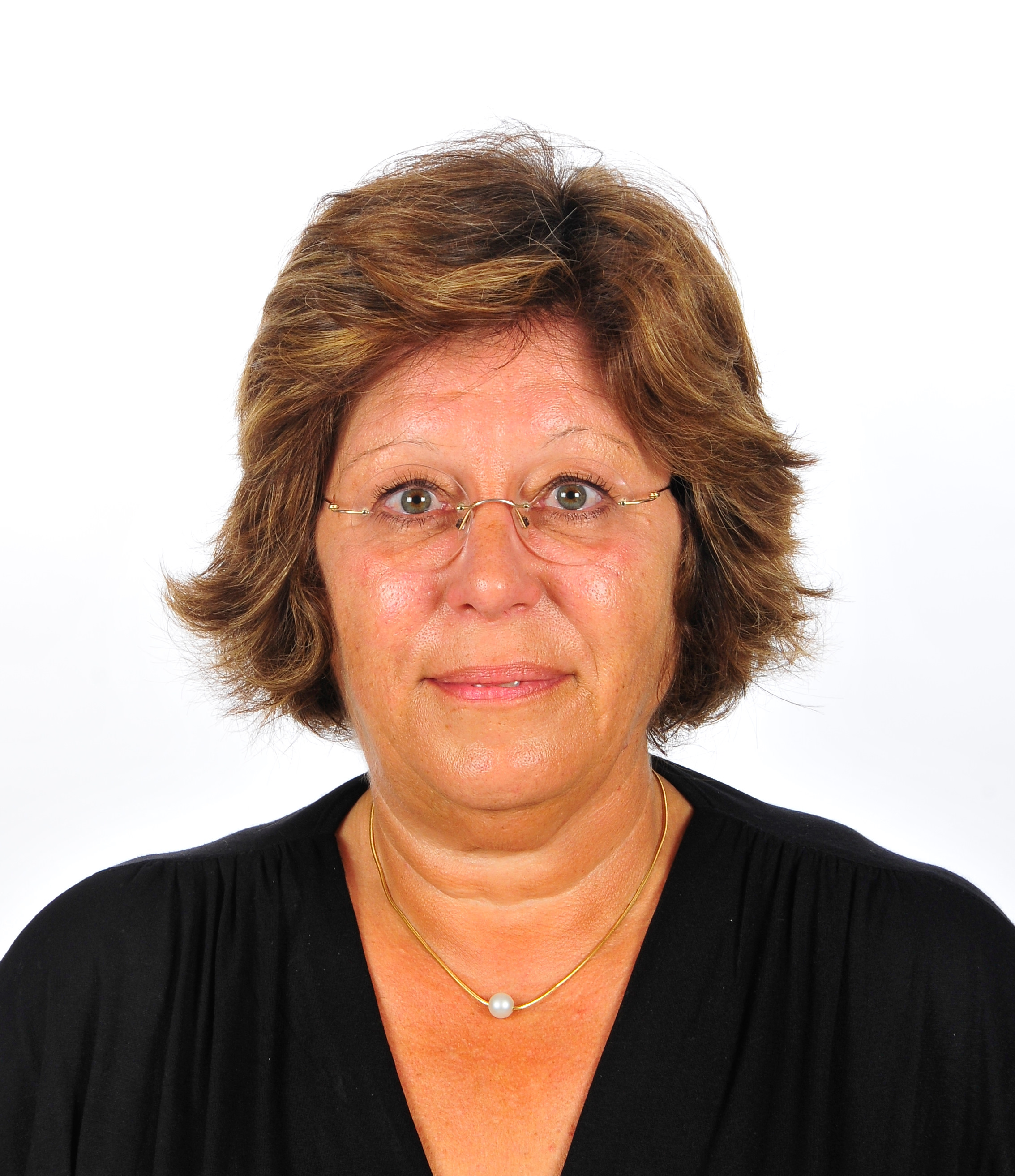

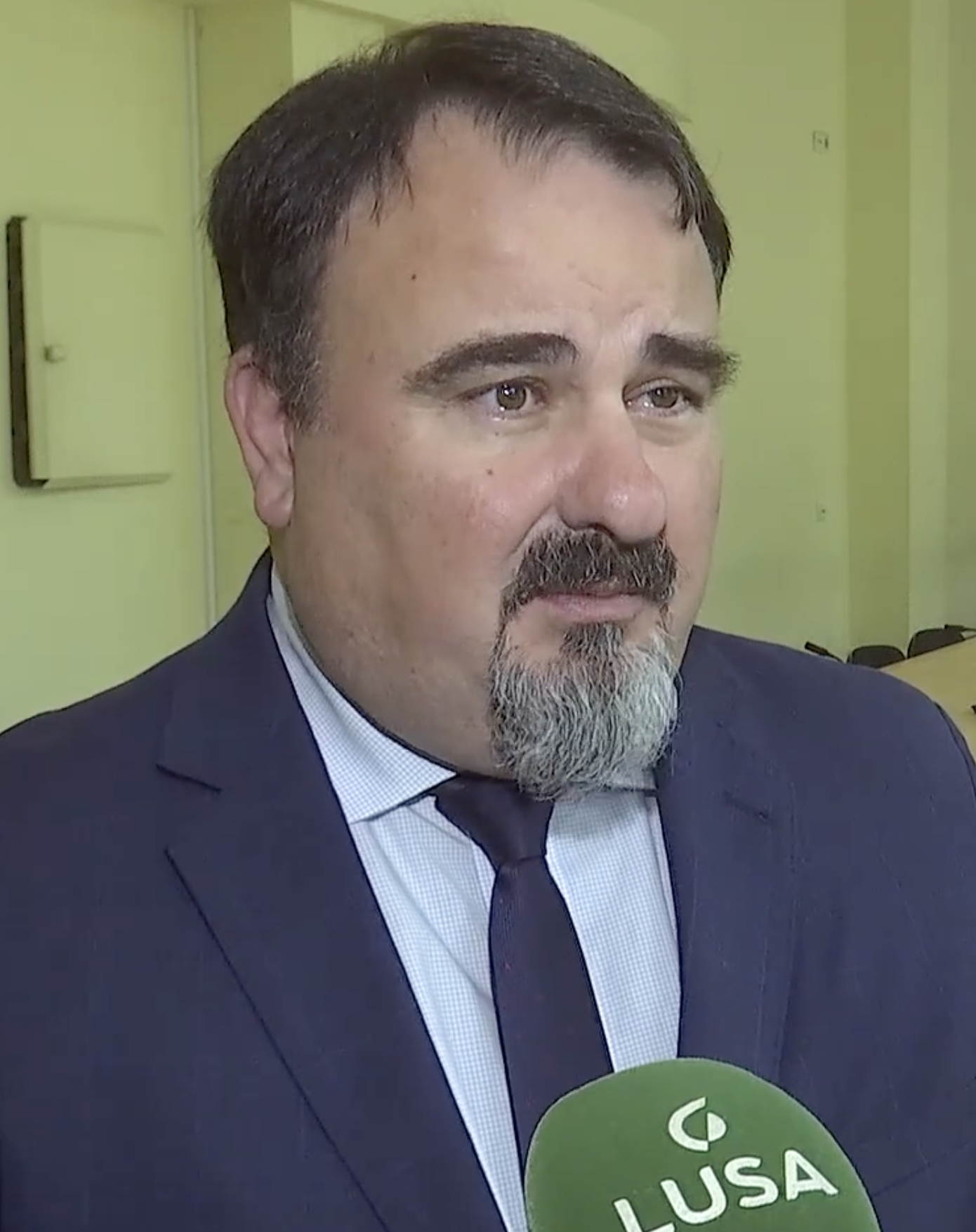
	First party	Second party	Third party
Leader	Vasco Cordeiro	Duarte Freitas	Artur Lima
Party	PS	PSD	CDS–PP
Leader since	8 October 2011	18 December 2012	March 2007
Leader's seat	São Miguel	São Miguel	Terceira
Last election	31 seats, 49.0%	20 seats, 33.0%	3 seats, 5.6%
Seats won	30	19	4
Seat change	▼1	▼1	▲1
Popular vote	43,274	28,793	6,674
Percentage	46.4%	30.9%	7.2%
Swing	▼2.6 pp	▼2.1 pp	▲1.6 pp
	Fourth party	Fifth party	Sixth party
Leader	Zuraida Soares	João Corvelo	Paulo Estêvão
Party	BE	PCP	PPM
Alliance		CDU
Leader since	2004	2016	2000
Leader's seat	São Miguel	Flores	Corvo
Last election	1 seat, 2.3%	1 seats, 1.9%	1 seat, 0.9%
Seats won	2	1	1
Seat change	▲1	0	0
Popular vote	3,414	2,437	866
Percentage	3.7%	2.6%	0.9%
Swing	▲1.4 pp	▲0.7 pp	▲0.8 pp
- Map showing island constituencies won by political parties
President before election
Vasco Cordeiro
PS
Elected President
Vasco Cordeiro
PS

The 2016 Azorean regional election (Portuguese: Eleições regionais dos Açores de 2016) was on October 16 of the same year. In this election, the incumbent president of the regional government, led by the Socialist Vasco Cordeiro, was seeking a second term.

In this election, the PS maintained their absolute majority but lost one seat and lost 2.6 percent of the vote compared to 2012. The Social Democrats also lost one seat although their vote share fall was lower than the Socialists. The big winner was the People's Party which gain 7 percent of the vote and gained one seat compared to 2012. The Left Bloc also won one more seat compared to last time while the CDU maintained their only seat but at the same time, gained in share of the vote and was the most voted party in the island of Flores. The PPM also maintained their seat in the island of Corvo.

Turnout in this election was the lowest ever, as only 40.84 percent of the electorate cast a ballot.

== Background ==
=== Leadership changes and challenges ===
==== Social Democratic Party ====
Following the defeat of the PSD in the 2012 regional election, then party leader Berta Cabral resigned and a leadership ballot was called for 18 December 2012. Only one candidate was on the ballot: Duarte Freitas. Freitas was easily elected leader with almost 93 percent of the votes:

Ballot: 18 December 2012
Candidate	Votes	%
Duarte Freitas	1,401	92.6
Blank/Invalid ballots	112	7.4
Turnout	1,513	–

== Electoral system ==
The Azores regional parliament elects 57 members through a proportional system in which the 9 islands elect a number of MPs proportional to the number of registered voters. MPs are allocated by using the D'Hondt method. 5 members are also elected for a Compensation constituency.

Constituency	Total MPs	Registered voters
Corvo	2	334
Faial	4	13,019
Flores	3	3,187
Graciosa	3	4,411
Pico	4	13,496
Santa Maria	3	5,499
São Jorge	3	8 648
São Miguel	20	127,206
Terceira	10	52,409
Compensation	5	
Total	57	228,259

== Current parties in parliament ==
The parties that up to date of election were represented in the Assembly and their leaders, are:

Party	Leader	MPs
Socialist Party (PS)	Vasco Cordeiro	31
Social Democratic Party (PPD/PSD)	Duarte Freitas	20
People's Party (CDS–PP)	Artur Lima	3
Unitary Democratic Coalition (PCP–PEV)	Aníbal Pires	1
Left Bloc (BE)	Zuraida Soares	1
People's Monarchist Party (PPM)	Paulo Estêvâo	1

== Opinion Polling ==
Poll results are listed in the table below in reverse chronological order, showing the most recent first. The highest percentage figure in each polling survey is displayed in bold, and the background shaded in the leading party's colour. In the instance that there is a tie, then no figure is shaded but both are displayed in bold. The lead column on the right shows the percentage-point difference between the two parties with the highest figures. Poll results use the date the survey's fieldwork was done, as opposed to the date of publication.

Exit poll

Polling firm/Link	Fieldwork date	Sample size	TO	PS	PSD	CDS–PP	BE	CDU	O	Lead
**2016 regional elections**	16 Oct 2016	—N/a	40.8	**46.4**; 30	30.9; 19	7.2; 4	3.7; 2	2.6; 1	9.2; 1	**15.5**
UCP-CESOP	16 Oct 2016	6,905	38–43	**50–55**; 31/35	27–31; 17/21	5–7; 2/3	2–4; 0/1	1–3; 0/1	1–4; 0/2	23–24
Norma Açores	20–28 Sep 2016	900	65.4	**66.9**; 36/41	20.7; 12/17	3.2; 2/4	1.7; 0/1	1.2; 0/1	6.3; 0/1	46.2
**2015 legislative election**	4 Oct 2015	—N/a	41.2	**40.4**	36.1	3.9	7.8	2.5	9.3	**4.3**
Norma Açores	15–21 Apr 2015	503	?	**33.2**	27.9	1.1	1.3	1.3	6.1	5.3
**2014 EP elections**	25 May 2014	—N/a	19.7	**41.3**	29.6		3.9	3.7	21.5	**11.7**
**2013 local elections**	29 Sep 2013	—N/a	54.0	**46.9**	41.9	2.6	1.6	1.7	5.3	**5.0**
**2012 regional elections**	14 Oct 2012	—N/a	47.9	**49.0**; 31	33.0; 20	5.6; 3	2.3; 1	1.9; 1	8.2; 1	**16.0**

== Voter turnout ==
The table below shows voter turnout throughout election day.

Turnout	Time								
Turnout	11:00			16:00			19:00		
Turnout	2012	2016	±	2012	2016	±	2012	2016	±
Total	10.34%	7.47%	▼2.96 pp	34.37%	29.29%	▼5.08 pp	47.86%	40.85%	▼7.01 pp

== Results ==
Summary of the 16 October 2016 Legislative Assembly of Azores elections results
Parties	Votes	%	±pp swing	MPs				
Parties	Votes	%	±pp swing	2012	2016	±	%	±
Socialist	43,274	46.43	▼2.6	31	30	▼1	52.63	▼1.8
Social Democratic	28,793	30.90	▼2.1	20	19	▼1	33.33	▼1.8
People's	6,674	7.16	▲1.6	3	4	▲1	7.02	▲1.8
Left Bloc	3,414	3.66	▲1.4	1	2	▲1	3.51	▲1.8
Democratic Unity Coalition^{[A]}	2,437	2.61	▲0.7	1	1	0	1.75	0.0
People–Animals–Nature	1,342	1.44	▲0.8	0	0	0	0.00	0.0
People's Monarchist	866	0.93	▲0.8	1	1	0	1.75	0.0
United Party of Retirees and Pensioners	451	0.48	—N/a	—N/a	0	—N/a	0.00	—N/a
Earth	343	0.37	▼0.4	0	0	0	0.00	0.0
Portuguese Workers' Communist	299	0.32	0.0	0	0	0	0.00	0.0
FREE/Time to move Forward	227	0.24	—N/a	—N/a	0	—N/a	0.00	—N/a
Democratic Republican	83	0.09	—N/a	—N/a	0	—N/a	0.00	—N/a
Socialist Alternative Movement	67	0.07	—N/a	—N/a	0	—N/a	0.00	—N/a
Total valid	88,270	94.69	▼0.8	57	57	0	100.00	0.0
Blank ballots	2,697	2.90	▼0.3					
Invalid ballots	2,227	2.40	▲1.1					
Total	93,194	100.00						
Registered voters/turnout	228,162	40.85	▼7.0					
^{A} Portuguese Communist Party (1 MPs) and "The Greens" (0 MPs) ran in coalition.
Source: Comissão Nacional de Eleições

Vote share
PS	46.43%
PSD	30.90%
CDS-PP	7.16%
BE	3.66%
CDU	2.61%
PAN	1.44%
PPM	0.93%
Others	1.57%
Blank/Invalid	5.30%

Parliamentary seats
PS	52.63%
PSD	33.33%
CDS-PP	7.02%
BE	3.51%
CDU	1.75%
PPM	1.75%

=== Distribution by constituency ===
Results of the 2016 election of the Legislative Assembly of Azores by constituency
Constituency	%	S	%	S	%	S	%	S	%	S	%	S	Total S
Constituency	PS		PSD		CDS-PP		BE		CDU		PPM		Total S
Corvo	36.7	1	26.2	-			0.4	-	1.6	-	32.0	1	2
Faial	32.6	2	41.2	2	6.5	-	6.4	-	4.6	-	1.5	-	4
Flores	23.7	1	21.0	1	17.0	-	1.3	-	32.5	1			3
Graciosa	54.6	2	36.7	1	1.7	-	1.2	-	0.5	-	0.5	-	3
Pico	39.5	2	37.8	2	14.1	-	1.1	-	1.5	-	0.4	-	4
Santa Maria	50.3	2	29.1	1	1.8	-	4.4	-	8.3	-	0.6	-	3
São Jorge	39.5	1	21.4	1	26.3	1	2.8	-	3.0	-	0.7	-	3
São Miguel	49.2	12	30.6	7	3.2	-	4.2	1	1.5	-	1.2	-	20
Terceira	49.0	6	28.8	3	10.1	1	3.1	-	1.5	-	0.3	-	10
Compensation		1		1		2		1		-		-	5
Total	46.4	30	30.9	19	7.2	4	3.7	2	2.6	1	0.9	1	57
Source: Azores Government
