= 10th Regional Legislature (Azores) =

10th Regional Legislature of the Azores X Legislatura da Região Autónoma dos Açores
- X Legislatura da Assembleia Legislativa da Região Autónoma dos Açores

Type
- Type: Unicameral

Leadership
- President: Ana Luís, PS since 5 November 2012
- Vice-President: Berta Cabral, PSD since 5 November 2012
- Vice-President: Ricardo Cabral (PS), PS since 5 November 2012
- Representative: Bárbara Chaves, PS since 5 November 2012
- Representative: Valdemiro Vasconcelos (PSD), PSD since 5 November 2012

Structure
- Seats: 57
- Legislative Assembly political groups: Socialist Party, Social Democratic Party, People's Party, Left Bloc, Portuguese Communist Party, People's Monarchist Party

Elections
- Legislative Assembly voting system: Party-list proportional representation D'Hondt method
- Last Legislative Assembly election: 14 October 2012

Motto
- Antes morrer livres que em paz sujeitos (Rather die as free men than be enslaved in peace)

Meeting place
- Legislative Assembly of the Azores; Horta, Faial (Azores), Portugal

Website
- www.alra.pt

The 10th Regional Legislature (5 November 2012 to 2 November 2016) was formed after regional elections held on 14 October 2012, in which the Socialist Party (PS). Representatives of the Assembly were elected from 57 constituencies, with the majority of the seats occupied by members of PS, under the leadership of Vasco Cordeiro, who became President of the Regional Government of the Azores.

== History ==
Election Results 14 October 2012
Island	PS	PSD	CDS	BE	CDU	PPM
Corvo	1	0	0	0	0	1
Faial	2	2	0	0	0	0
Flores	2	1	0	0	0	0
Graciosa	1	2	0	0	0	0
Pico	2	2	0	0	0	0
Santa Maria	2	1	0	0	0	0
São Jorge	2	2	1	0	0	0
São Miguel	12	7	0	0	0	0
Terceira	6	3	1	0	0	0

Following the Azores Regional Election held on 14 October 2012, in which Vasco Cordeiro's Socialist Party won a plurality of the votes cast, the president-elect was asked to form the next government.

The Socialist Party won these elections, taking eight of the nine islands of the archipelago (except on the island of Graciosa where the plurality of seats went to the PSD), electing 31 of the 57 regional deputies. The victory marked the fifth consecutive PS mandate, this time in the hands of its young leader. The elections were run under the shadow of national austerity programs imposed by the Troika and national government of Prime Minister Pedro Passos Coelho, which conditioned many of the statements coming from most of the parties in the election. The president-elect originally avoided any reference to the economic crisis in Portugal in the aftermath of the elections, and focused more what he saw as the "sweet victory" over his competitors.

In declarations made to journalists, after his audience with the Representative of the Republic to the Azores, in Angra do Heroísmo, he issued the following statement (on 31 October 2012): "I was asked to form the next Government and, in conformity with what was accorded with the Representative of the Republic, on the following Friday, I will transmit the composition of the 21st Government of the Azores". At that time, he indicated his intention to make job-creation the "principal challenge that Azoreans encounter" his government's priority, although revealing little detail as to the form of the new executive. "It is a great honour that the Azorean people bestowed me in this project as leader", adding that he would "serve the interests of the Azores [and] would contribute to this work..in order to succeed in the challenges that ly ahead for the region."

The day before the formal opening of the regional legislature, the election of the president of the Assembly occurred, installing the Azores' first woman chairperson/president. Ana Luís, a 36-year-old economist, was elected after general debate, where members of the legislature voted 43 in favor against 13 votes. In a surprise move, Berta Cabral, the Social Democratic leader (which had resigned the leadership in the aftermath of the election) was elected as one of the vice-presidents, along with Ricardo Cabral (PS), Bárbara Chaves (PS) and Valdemiro Vasconcelos (PSD). At the end of this session, Ana Luísa thanked the members of the legislature, stating her "dedication and effort to honour the position and provide dignity to the Azorean autonomy", noting her intention to exercise her new functions with "all the rigor and impartiality".

The Regional Government of the Azores took office on 6 November 2012, in the Legislative Assembly in Horta.

== Regional Government ==
Vasco Cordeiro presented his new Government on 2 November 2012, one which was "...smaller, more agile and one that reinforced the communication between policies and between departments."

The president-elect offered a revised group of six regional secretariats and one sub-secretariat. Part of these revision would result in the powers of the Vice-Presidency expanding under Sérgio Ávila, who would also manage the portfolio of Emprego (Employment) and Competitividade Empresarial (Business Competitiveness).

The Secretaria Regional do Turismo e Transportes (Regional Secretariate for Tourism and Transport) was also one of the new changes, which would incorporate the regions tourist and transport links, as well as issues associated with public works, communication, technology and energy. The Secretaria Regional dos Recursos Naturais (Regional Secretariate for Natural Resources) would become responsible for agriculture, environment and sea resources.

Geographically, the XI Government of the Azores, in addition to the Presidency, that would continue to rest in Ponta Delgada, other secretariates would be distributed to Ponta Delgada, Angra do Heroísmo and Horta. In addition the seat of the Vice-Presidency, Employment and Business Competitiveness, the Regional Secretary for Tourism and Transports, and Regional Sub-Secretariate for External Relations would remain in the largest regional capital. Meanwhile, Angra do Heroísmo would become the seat of the Secretaria Regional da Solidariedade Social (Regional Secretariate for Social Solidarity), Secretaria Regional da Saúde (Regional Secretary for Health) and Secretaria Regional da Educação, Ciência e Cultura (Regional Secretary for Education, Science and Culture); and the Secretaria Regional dos Recursos Naturais would remain on the island of Faial. Formally, this cabinet included:

- Presidente (President of the Regional Government):

Vasco Ilídio Alves Cordeiro;

- Vice-Presidente (Vice-President of the Regional Government):

Sérgio Humberto Rocha de Ávila;

- Secretária Regional da Solidariedade Social (Regional Secretary for Social Solidarity)

Maria da Piedade Lima Lalanda Gonçalves Mano

- Secretário Regional da Saúde (Regional Secretary for Health)

Luís Mendes Cabral

- Secretário Regional da Educação, Ciência e Cultura

Luiz Manuel Fagundes Duarte

- Secretário Regional do Turismo e Transportes (Regional Secretary for Tourism and Transports)

Vítor Manuel Ângelo de Fraga

- Secretário Regional dos Recursos Naturais (Regional Secretary for Natural Resources)

Luís Nuno Ponte Neto de Viveiros

- Subsecretário Regional da Presidência para as Relações Externas (Presidential Sub-Secretary for External Relations)

Rodrigo Vasconcelos de Oliveira

Addressing the opening of the legislature, Vasco Cordeiro indicated that it was "essential" to have "a smaller, more agile" executive/cabinet, and better interdepartmental cooperation. His speech focused on unemployment, stating "that the government for its part can not only create employment...we can not create jobs by decree, we need to work on the creating of conditions so that business can manage and maintain jobs, and on the other hand, work to attract human resources in order for them to find employment". At the same time he criticized the government of Pedro Passos Coelho, while indicating their mutual need to cooperate, suggesting the need to make sure that the Regional Finance Laws were not "amputated in their utility, or that their objectives were not perverted" by problems nationally. He referred specifically to the financial problems at the University of the Azores and the abandoning of RTP Açores, among other issues arising from austerity measures imposed at the national level.

After some time in deliberating, the government of the Azores introduced their 22 regional directors, which included 10 completely novice representatives (a 45% cleaning of the slate for the continuing Socialist government of Vasco Cordeiro). With a median age of 44 years, the new team accompanied moves by the government to reduce regional secretariats, the creation, extinction and fusion of several services, as well as the elimination of three regional directorates (from 30 to 27).

=== Cabinet shuffle ===
On 3 August 2014, president Vasco Cordeiro shuffled the cabinet creating two new departments: the Secretaria Regional do Mar, Ciência e Tecnologia (Regional Secretary for Sea, Science and Technology) based in the city of Horta, and the Secretário Regional Adjunto da Presidência para os Assuntos Parlamentares (President's Adjunct Regional Secretary for Parliamentary Affairs), whose seat was in Ponta Delgada. Consequently, these posts were filled by:

- Secretário Regional Adjunto da Presidência para os Assuntos Parliamentares (President's Adjunct Regional Secretary for Parliamentary Affairs)

Isabel Maria Duarte Almeida Rodrigues

- Secretaria Regional do Mar, Ciência e Tecnologia (Regional Secretary for Sea, Science and Technology)

Fausto Costa Gomes de Brito e Abreu

The restructuring of this posts included the departure of Piedade Lalanda in Social Solidarity, which would assumed by Andreia Martins Cardoso da Costa (former president of the Municipal Council of Angra do Heroísmo); and Luiz Fagundes Duarte at Education, Science and Culture who vacated the position, and was replaced by former rector at the University of the Azores, Avelino Meneses, in the revised Secretaria Regional da Educação e Cultura (Regional Secretary for Education and Culture). Still within the cabinet shuffle, the Natural Resources portfolio was re-designated the Regional Secretary for Agriculture and Environment, while Luís Nuno Ponte Neto de Viveiros continued in this post.

The August shuffle was revised on 2 September 2014, with the nomination of new regional directors, that assumed titles in Science and Technology, in Agriculture, in Social Solidarity, in Health and in Education, in addition to directorship of the administrative council of IAMA Instituto de Alimentação e Mercados Agrícolas (Institute for Food and Agricultural Markets). As a result, the reduced cabinet that was implemented after the election, expanded to include:

- Secretário Regional da Ciência e Tecnologia (Regional Secretary for Science and Technology)

Nélson Simões, with a licentiate and doctorate in Biology from the University of the Azores, was a professor (at the same university) and Coordinator for Centre for Natural Resource Investigation (Portuguese: Centro de Investigação de Recursos Naturais dos Açores). Member of the Order of Biologists, he coordinated a team in applied biology, with competencies in animal experimentation, microbiology, biochemistry, and molecular biology, responsible for investigations into genetic diversity in the Azores.

- Secretário Regional da Agricultura (Regional Secretary for Agriculture)

Fernando Moniz Sousa, with a licentiate from the University of Coimbra, and masters in the Evaluation of Geological Risk from the University of the Azores, in functions such as agriculture, consultation in geology and geotectonics.

- Secretário Regional da Solidariedade Social (Regional Secretary for Social Solidarity)

Frederico Furtado Sousa, with a role as superior technician at SPRHI Sociedade de Promoção e Reabilitação de Habitação e Infraestruturas (Society for the Promotion and Rehabilitation of Habitations and Infrastructures), was responsible for coordinating projects in social housing, but was also a representative in the administrative council of NONAGON, the technological park of the Azores.

- Secretário Regional da Sáude (Regional Secretary for Health)

João Batista Soares, was licensed in medicine at the University of Lisbon, with a masters in Public Health and Management and Public Health Policy from the University of Amherst, in Massachusetts. He collaborated in the creation and establishment of the Health Unit of São Miguel, not before working for the nonnão-governmental Massachusetts Alliance of Portuguese Speakers (MAPS), where he implemented an education program for the prevention of sickness and promote health.

- Secretário Regional da Educação (Regional Secretary for Education)

Fabíola Cardoso, with a licentiate in Portuguese and English Studies, from the University of the Azores, and masters in Pedagogical Supervision, from the University of Aveiro, he was a teacher at the secondary school of Lagoa, and pedagogical supervisor for integrated licentiate internships in teaching, and team of supervisors professional services, in the Department of Educational Sciences at the university. He taught classes in Portuguese for professors and was an instructor for initial and continuing education for teachers, communicating and publishing articles in this theme.

The new nominations occurred two months after an earlier government reshuffle that created the Secretário do Mar, Ciência e Tecnologia (Secretariate for Sea, Science and Technology) and altered the Education and Social Solidarity portfolios. Citing that the four new secretariates would "serve Azoreans" and provide "a new dynamism" in their portfolios, the installation of the new administrators was held in a ceremony in Horta.

== Session ==
One of the first issues arising in the new legislature was the memorandum of understanding between the national and regional government.

The PCP deputy and party leader, Aníbal Pires, requested that the Azorean parliament deliberate on the State Budget for 2013, in light of the austerity measures whose " effects were graver in the Azores", citing possible effects to the regional economy, employment and life of families. The State Budget would require that the Azores reduce by 50% the number fixed-term public service workers. The end of regional subsidies, retention of IRS surtaxes, and the reduction of public health services were other points cited by the deputy in his proclamation. In normal circumstances it is the parliamentary commission for the Economy that would act on this issues, noting that this body was not convened yet, and could not deliberate as it was being formed following the beginning of the legislature. Azorean deputies were expected to convene to discuss the Government's program for the next four years.
