= Juan Curbelo =

Juan Curbelo may refer to:

- Juan Curbelo (weightlifter) (born 1946), Cuban Olympic weightlifter
- Juan Ramón Curbelo (born 1979), Uruguayan footballer
- Juan Curbelo (Tejano settler), Spanish politician, mayor of San Antonio, Texas in 1737 and 1739
