= Duarte Freitas =

Portuguese politician

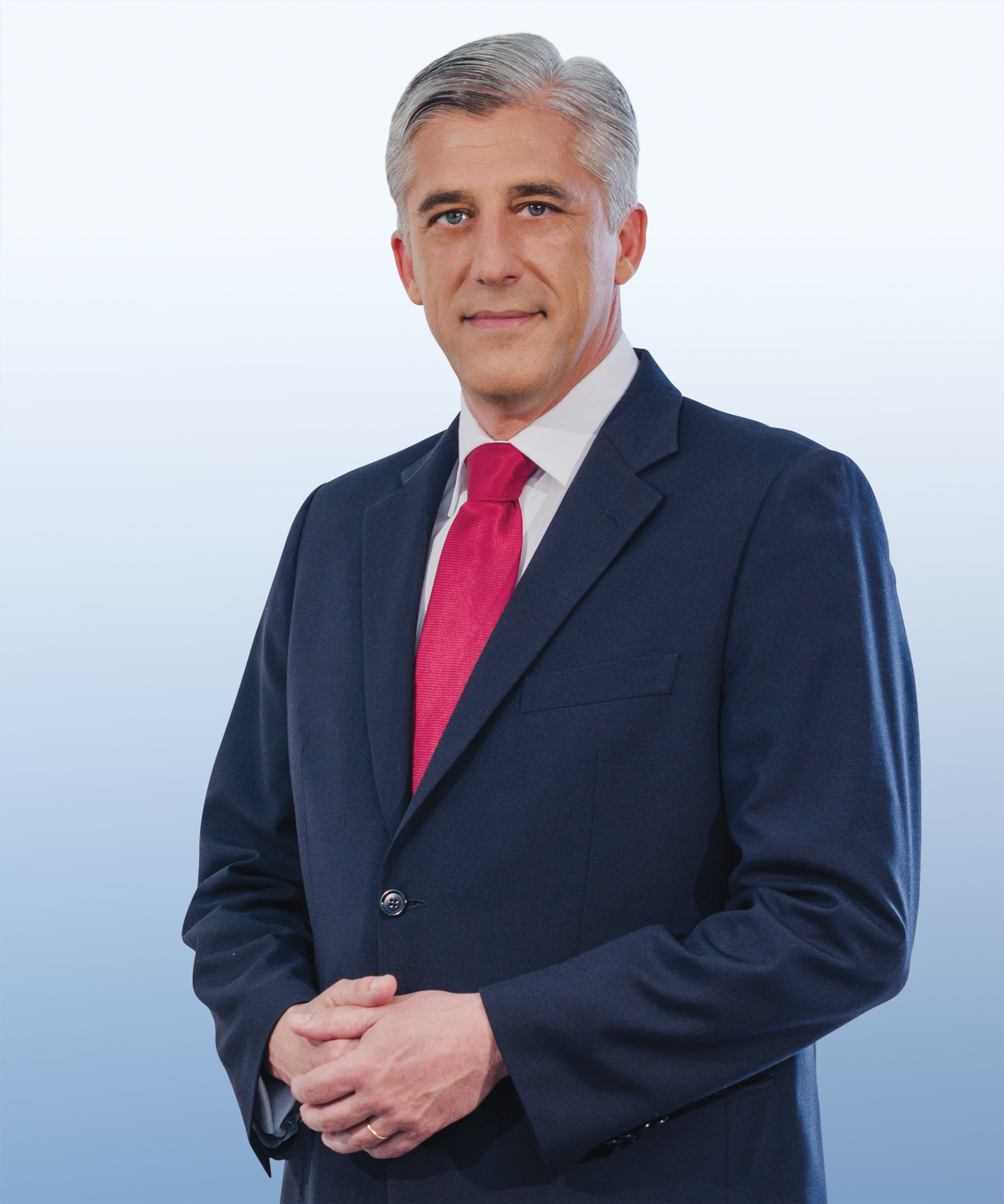

President of the Azorean section of the Social Democratic Party
- Incumbent
- Assumed office 19 December 2012
- Preceded by: Berta Cabral

Member of the Legislative Assembly of the Azores
- Incumbent
- Assumed office 3 November 2016
- Constituency: São Miguel
- In office 7 November 1996 – 20 July 2004
- In office 14 July 2009 – 2 November 2016
- Constituency: Pico

Member of the European Parliament
- In office 20 July 2004 – 13 July 2009
- Constituency: Portugal

Personal details
- Born: Duarte Nuno D'Ávila Martins de Freitas; 10 August 1966 (age 60) São Roque do Pico, Azores, Portugal
- Party: Social Democratic Party
- Children: 3 children
- Education: Universidade Nova de Lisboa
- Occupation: Politician
- Profession: Economist

Duarte Nuno D'Ávila Martins de Freitas (born 10 August 1966 in São Roque do Pico, Azores) is a Portuguese politician and former member of the European Parliament for the Social Democratic Party–People's Party coalition; part of the European People's Party–European Democrats group. He became the leader of the Azorean Social Democratic Party (PSD/A), following the 2012 Regional Elections.

== Biography ==
He concluded his secondary school education in the 1983-1984 school year, from the Escola Secundária de Angra do Heroísmo and entered the Faculty of Economics at the Universidade Nova de Lisboa (1984-1985 year). In 1989-90 finished his licentiate degree in the organization and management of businesses, from the University of the Azores. He is a member of the Order of Economists (Portuguese: Ordem dos Economistas) and member of the Chartered Accountants (Portuguese: Câmara dos Técnicos Oficiais de Contas).

=== Career ===
His professional career was involved in the regional public administration, and was active in the business-side of the agricultural sector, such as his roles in the Associação de Agricultores da Ilha do Pico (Agricultural Association for the Island of Pico) and Federação Agrícola dos Açores (Agricultural Federation of the Azores), respectively.

Duarte Freitas was actively linked to local, regional and European politics. He was the vice-president of the municipal government of São Roque do Pico, president of the Associação de Municípios do Triângulo (Municipal Association for the Triangle) and president of the municipal assembly of São Roque do Pico.

From 1996 to 2004, he was member of the regional Legislative Assembly, member of the parliamentary commission on the Economy, and vice-president of the PSD/A parliamentary group.

Between 2004 and 2009, he was a European parliamentary deputy, and effective member of various commissions (specifically the Agriculture and Rural Development, Fishing, Climate Change, Environment and Public Health) and participated as auxiliary member or member of the European delegations to Canada and Mercosur. As deputy he participated in the elaboration of several funding reports, among them the POSEI/Agricultura and POSEI/Pescas, in addition to authoring 600 proposals for alterations to 100 documents, and was responsible for the visit by the European Parliamentary commission on Agriculture and Rural Development to the Azores. In addition he was a speaker to diverse conferences and lectures at academic institutions.

As a deputy for the island of Pico, he became the president of the regional Political Commission of the PSD/Açores and parliamentary leader on 10 February 2011, succeeded António Soares Marinho. He announced his intention to become a candidate to replace Berta Cabral, following the 2012 regional elections, when the party lost to the PS/Açores. On 19 December 2012 he was elected leader of the party, with 92.6% support, promising "enthusiasm and motivation" to a position of "enormous responsibility". He was reelected in 2015, with 92.4% support.
