= José Manuel Bolieiro =

Portuguese politician

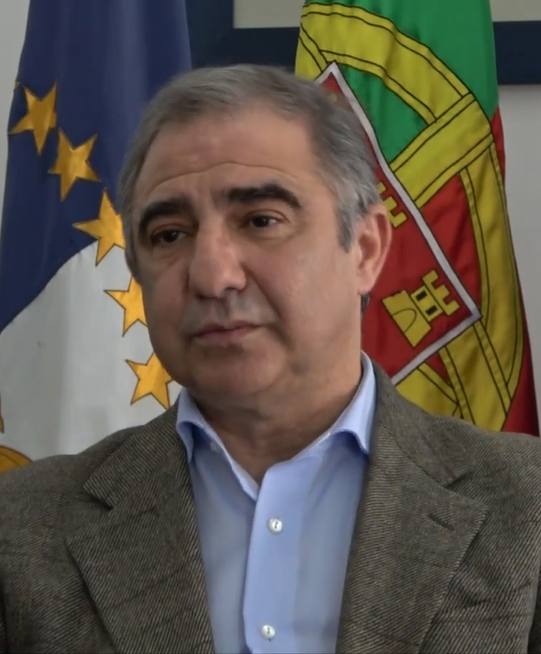
- Bolieiro in 2024

President of the Regional Government of the Azores
- Incumbent
- Assumed office 24 November 2020
- Vice President: Artur Lima
- Representative: Pedro Catarino; Susana Goulart Costa
- Preceded by: Vasco Cordeiro

Mayor of Ponta Delgada
- In office 1 August 2012 – 2 March 2020
- Preceded by: Berta Cabral
- Succeeded by: Maria José Duarte

Member of the Legislative Assembly of the Azores
- In office 9 November 1998 – 11 October 2009
- Constituency: São Miguel Island

Personal details
- Born: José Manuel Cabral Dias Bolieiro; 23 June 1965 (age 61) Povoação, Azores, Portugal
- Party: Social Democratic Party
- Education: University of Coimbra

José Manuel Cabral Dias Bolieiro (born 23 June 1965) is a Portuguese Social Democratic Party (PSD) politician, serving as the President of the Regional Government of the Azores since the 2020 election. As holder of that office, he is also a member of the Council of State.

== Early political career ==
Bolieiro graduated in law from the University of Coimbra. From 1998 to 2009 he was a member of the Legislative Assembly of the Azores, and served as his party's leader within it. He was the president of the municipal assembly in Povoação from 2002 to 2009, and then the deputy mayor of Ponta Delgada until 2012 when he took the mayoralty. He resigned to concentrate on leading his party in the 2020 regional election.

In July 2019, the leader of the PSD in the Azores, Alexandre Gaudêncio, was investigated for alleged violations of public contracting law when he was mayor of Ribeira Grande. He resigned in October and Bolieiro succeeded him in November, with 98.5% of the vote.

== President of the Government of the Azores ==
In the 2020 regional election, the PSD came second to the Socialist Party (PS) of incumbent president Vasco Cordeiro, but gained a majority after forming a government with the CDS – People's Party and the People's Monarchist Party (PPM), with support from Chega and the Liberal Initiative (IL).

In March 2023, Nuno Barata, the sole IL deputy in the Legislative Assembly of the Azores, withdrew his support from the government, as did Carlos Furtado, an independent formerly of Chega. The pair alleged that the government had broken its agreements and "mortgaging" the autonomy of the archipelago. In November, the budget for 2024 did not pass, as IL voted against and Chega abstained. After meeting with the President of Portugal Marcelo Rebelo de Sousa, Bolieiro announced a snap election for February 2024.

In the 2024 regional election, occurring one month before the national election, Bolieiro's PSD-CDS-PPM coalition retained its 26 seats. With the abstentions of the five members of Chega, one from IL and one from People Animals Nature, a motion of confidence in his government was approved.
