= 2012 Azorean regional election =

- 14 October 2012

57 seats to the Legislative Assembly of Azores 29 seats needed for a majority
- Opinion polls
- Turnout: 47.9% ▲1.2 pp
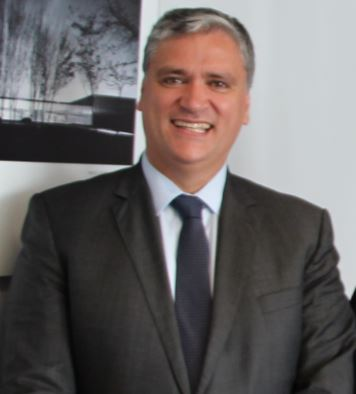

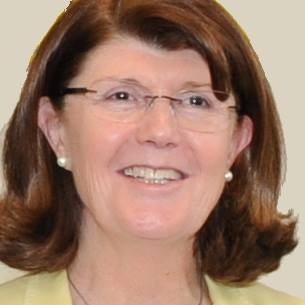

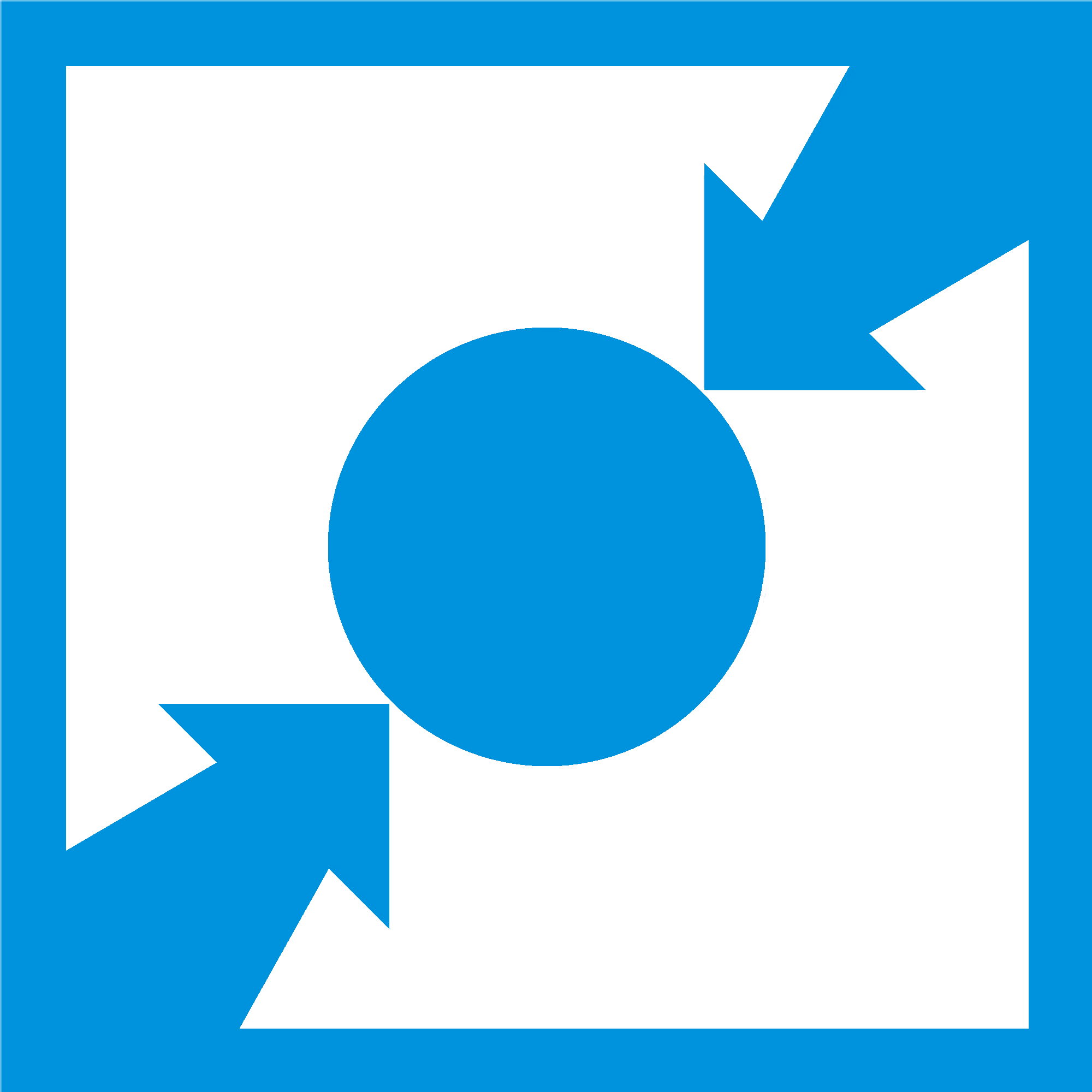

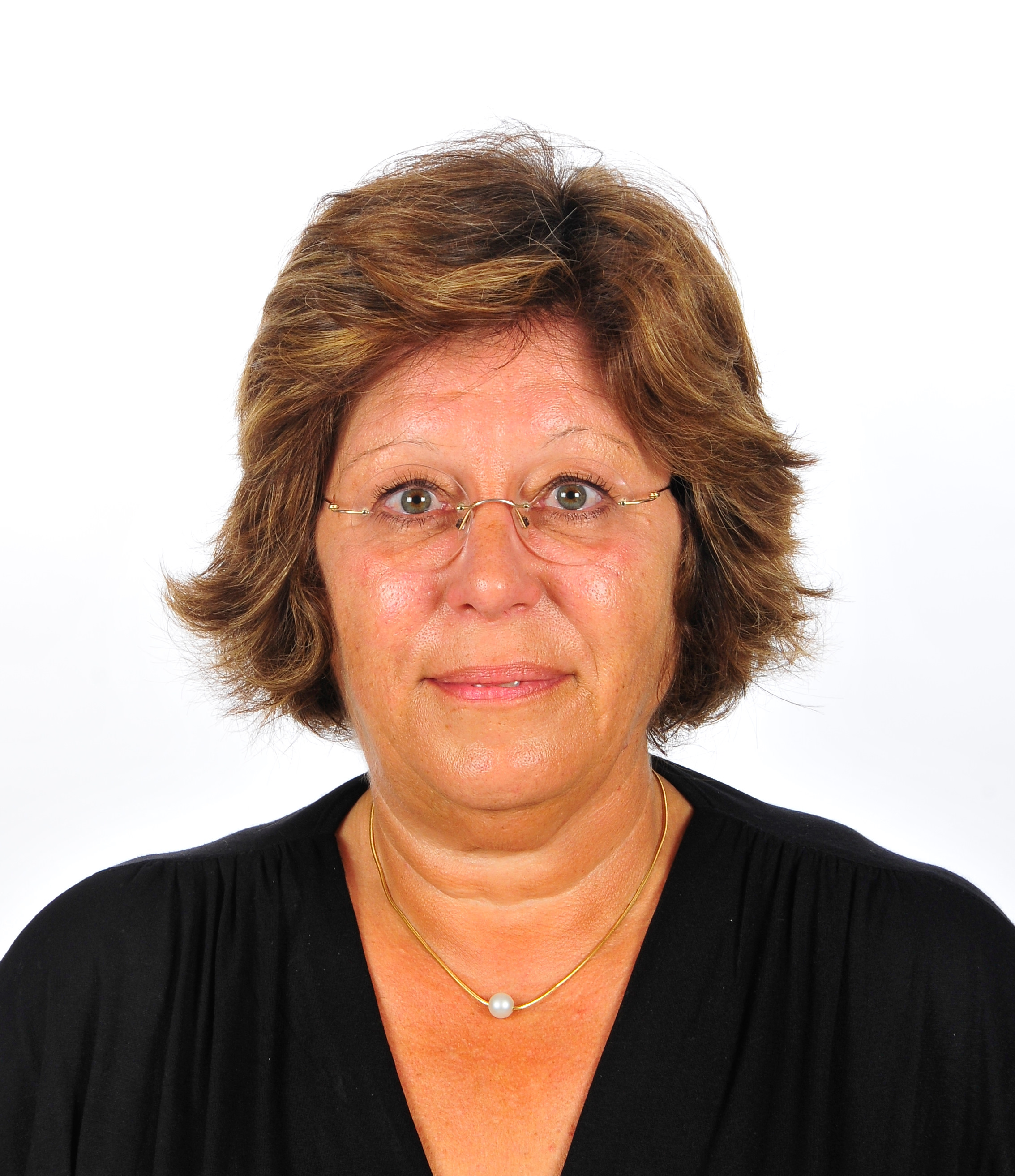

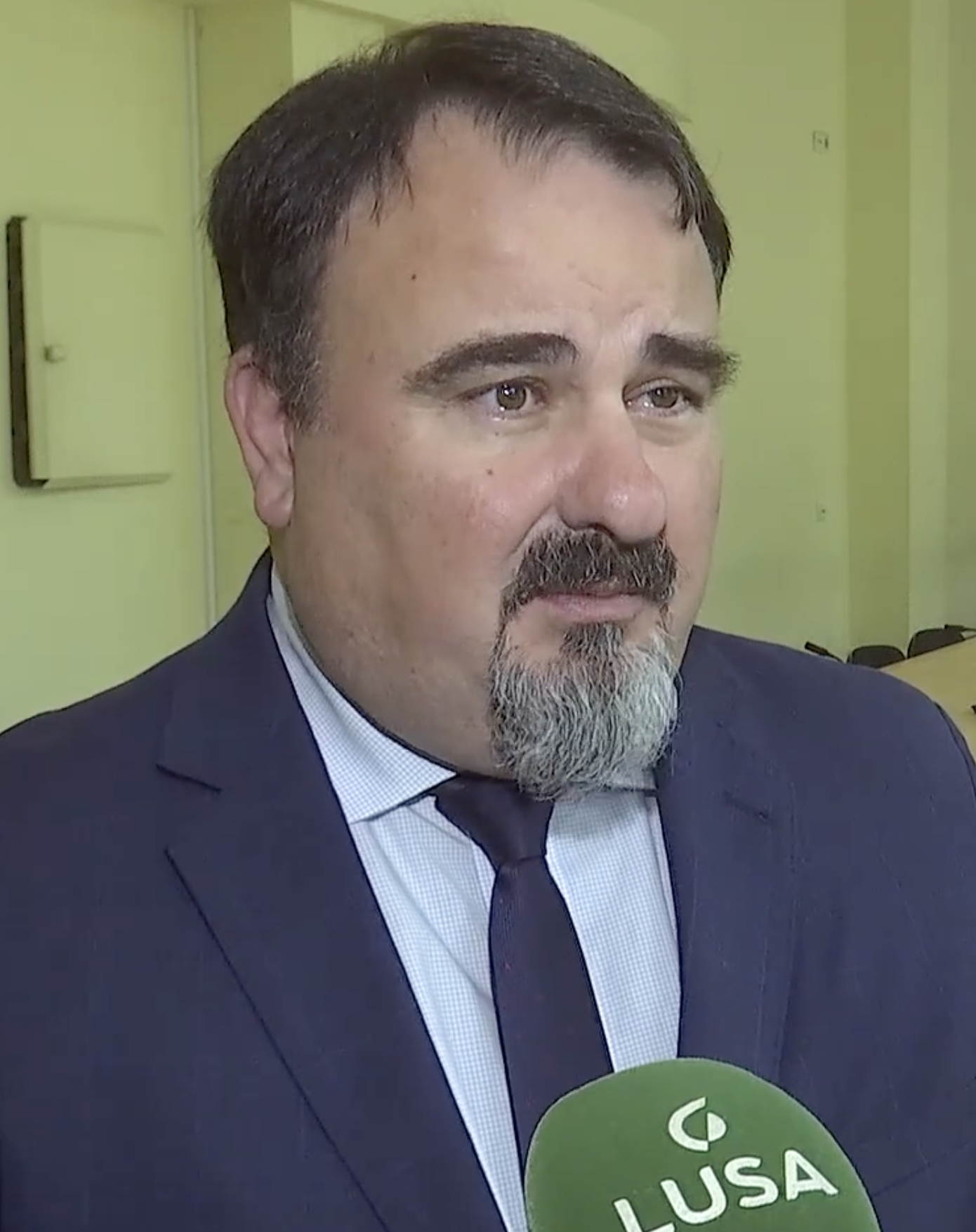
	First party	Second party	Third party
Leader	Vasco Cordeiro	Berta Cabral	Artur Lima
Party	PS	PSD	CDS–PP
Leader since	8 October 2011	17 December 2008	March 2007
Leader's seat	São Miguel	São Miguel	Terceira
Last election	30 seats, 49.9%	18 seats, 30.3%	5 seats, 8.7%
Seats won	31	20	3
Seat change	▲1	▲2	▼2
Popular vote	52,827	35,572	6,110
Percentage	49.0%	33.0%	5.7%
Swing	▼0.9 pp	▲2.7 pp	▼3.0 pp
	Fourth party	Fifth party	Sixth party
Leader	Zuraida Soares	Aníbal Pires	Paulo Estêvão
Party	BE	CDU	PPM
Leader since	2004	April 2005	2000
Leader's seat	São Miguel	São Miguel	Corvo
Last election	2 seats, 3.3%	1 seat, 3.1%	1 seat, 0.5%
Seats won	1	1	1
Seat change	▼1	0	0
Popular vote	2,428	2,045	86
Percentage	2.3%	1.9%	0.1%
Swing	▼1.0 pp	▼1.2 pp	▼0.4 pp
- Map showing island constituencies won by political parties
President before election
Carlos Cesar
PS
Elected President
Vasco Cordeiro
PS

The 2012 Azorean regional election (Portuguese: Eleições regionais dos Açores de 2012) was an election held on 14 October 2012 to elect the 57 members of the regional legislative assembly for Portuguese autonomous region of the Azores. The Socialist Party, under the leadership of Vasco Cordeiro won an absolute majority with 49 percent of the vote, while their direct rivals, the Social Democratic Party (led by Berta Cabral), achieved just 33 percent of the vote. Voter turnout was low (although higher than in 2008) with just under 47.9 percent of the electorate casting their ballot on election day.

== Background ==
The election was called by the President of the Republic, Aníbal Cavaco Silva after consulting with all the parties represented in the Azorean Legislative Assembly. Each of the parties had proposed different dates for these elections, with the Communists and Bloc representatives preferring 21 October 2012, while the Social Democrats favouring 7 or 14 October. The PPM preferred 30 September, the earliest date that these elections could be undertaken, defending that "the faster the better", although also proposing 7 October, as an alternative.

The elections marked the end of a 16 years of consecutive Socialist mandates led by outgoing regional President Carlos Cesar, who had announced his intention not to continue to lead the Socialist Party (PS) on 8 October 2011. In his place, the PS nominated Vasco Cordeiro to represent their party during several months of pre-campaigning against their rivals the Social Democrats (PSD), under the stewardship of then incumbent mayor of Ponta Delgada, Berta Cabral. The election occurred as a culmination of a years round of campaigning that started with the nomination of Vasco Cordeiro to replace the outgoing Carlos Cesar as leader of the party.

In 2011, Vasco Cordeiro, who held the position of Secretário Regional da Economia (Regional Secretary for the Economy) renounced his position in the government to dedicate himself to the elections, and was replaced by Luisa Schanderl in that post. Meanwhile, Berta Cabral continued to function as the mayor (Portuguese: Presidente) of Ponta Delgada until the end of July 2012, when she renounced her position in favour of her Vice-Presidente.

All 57 deputies of the regional assembly, distributed among the nine islands of the archipelago, were up for renewal. On 23 August 2012, Berta Cabral indicated her parties inclination not to run against the People's Monarchist Party (PPM) on the island of Corvo, where two seats were up for grab. Citing her party's intention to defeat the Socialists using a "winning strategy", the PSD leader advised that the PSD would not run candidates against PPM leader Paulo Estevão. For his part, Estevão noted that this decision did not imply his party's unconditional support of any PSD government.

During the campaign, Cybermap Lda., received national and regional publicity when its managing director revealed their involvement in a project to publicize realtime election results over the internet to mobile devices, including smartphones and tablet readers. This was the first time in Portugal that election content would be developed and publicized in realtime during any election, a project that also included information on local candidates, geographic distribution and historical results.

On 9 October 2012, the regional public broadcaster, RTP Açores, determined that a regional debate that would bring together leaders of the 12 parties running in the elections was unfeasible. Citing the lack of agreement between party representatives, the public broadcaster elaborated that the 90-minute two-debate model proposed (which would have two debates, one for parties with assembly representation and another with the remainder of the candidates) resulted in a formal complaint to the Commissão Nacional de Eleições (National Commission for Elections) by representatives from the PDA and MRPP. The option to have all parties in the same debate was unlikely also, since it was contrary to "fundamental basics of journalism or television communication models" and impractical.

=== Leadership changes and challenges ===
==== Social Democratic Party ====
After the defeat of the PSD in the 2008 regional election, then party leader Carlos Costa Neves resigned and a leadership ballot was called for 17 December 2008. Only one candidate was on the ballot: Incumbent mayor of Ponta Delgada, Berta Cabral. Cabral was easily elected leader and became the first woman to lead a regional party in the Azores:

Ballot: 17 December 2008
Candidate	Votes	%
Berta Cabral	2,410	98.5
Blank/Invalid ballots	36	1.5
Turnout	2,446	–

==== Socialist Party ====
During the 2008 regional election campaign, Carlos César announced that if he was reelected, this would be his last term as President of the Regional Government. In October 2011, the party's regional committee, by unanimous vote, nominated Vasco Cordeiro as the party's lead candidate for the 2012 regional election:

Ballot: 8 October 2011
Candidate	Votes	%
Vasco Cordeiro	Voice vote	
Turnout		100.0

== Electoral system ==
The Azores regional parliament elects 57 members through a proportional system in which the 9 islands elect a number of MPs proportional to the number of registered voters. MPs are allocated by using the d'Hondt method. 5 members are also elected for a Compensation constituency.

Constituency	Total MPs	Registered voters
Corvo	2	348
Faial	4	13,166
Flores	3	3,233
Graciosa	3	4,479
Pico	4	13,311
Santa Maria	3	5,208
São Jorge	4	8,786
São Miguel	19	124,387
Terceira	10	52,293
Compensation	5	
Total	57	225,211

== Issues ==
The influence of the European financial crisis, and continued latency in the Portuguese economy did not escape the election campaign. The unemployment rate in the Azores had grown to 15.6 percent, which was above the national rate (15.0 percent), and 5.9 percent greater than the same time in 2011. It was predicted that the unemployment rate would reach 16% by 2013. The region is heavily dependent on the public sector-driven economy, and the Government has not reduced, but actually hired more people to the Regional Secretaries (through public competition or through unemployment support programs). These activities have actually hidden the real increase in the unemployment rate, while measures to curtail the rise in public spending and implement austerity measures to reduce the debit did not occur.

An undercurrent of these elections was the state of regional public finances, with the Azorean public debit exceeding 2300 million Euros as of 31 December 2011, in a report issued by the national Inspeção Geral de Finanças (General Inspection of Finances). The report indicated that this figure resulted from debits of the regional administration (427 million Euros), regional public companies (1500 million Euros) and local authorities (327 million Euros). In addition to a warning about the regions "actual risk of budgetary slippage", the report also slighted future annual expenditures which would put in risk the state of the regions finances. These were, specifically, two public-private partnerships worth 1600 million Euros: the SCUT roadway concession, worth 1300 million Euros annually, and 330 million Euros for the Hospital da Terceira. The IGF concluded that "no risk requiring significant support" existed, but that unplanned costs (such as the Regional Health Plan) would require the region to "contain, freeze or reduce" incentives provided in some regional laws, in order to avoid the increase in public spending.

The issue of the region's public finances also influenced continued talk of reinforcing the archipelago's autonomy following a memorandum of understanding signed between the Portuguese and (proposed by) the Azorean Regional Governments, that provided for a 10-year 135 million Euro loan. Among the requirements of this understanding, the loan was dependent on: the guarantee that the Azores followed the objectives of the Programa de Ajustamento Econónomico e Financeiro (Program for Economic and Financial Adjustment); stabilized public finances; refrain from aggravating public finances (directly or indirectly) through the remuneration of public service employees, the reduction of public servants inline with the objectives of the PAEF; a promise not to create new public-private partnerships that resulted in new financial burdens; an analysis of existing public-partnerships (within three months from the memorandum's signing) as a precondition for funding; regular monthly bulletins on the state of Regional finances, remitted to the Direção-Geral do Orçamento (Directorate-General for the Budget); full cooperation with the Inspecção-Geral de Finanças (General Inspection for Finances); among other details. Many of the parties protested that agreement was equivalent to transferring the control of the Azores to the Ministry of Finances, requesting a debate on the issue in the Regional Assembly. Berta Cabral, leader of the PSD Açores, although aligned with the national government, cited her willingness to alter the terms of the memorandum if her party was elected. This stance was criticized by both the CDS-PP and PS leaders the next day, who cited the legality of the document and the desperation on the part of the PSD (stating that the understanding did not demand anything more than what was already required by Regional Finance Laws), respectively. Nonetheless, the PS leader used his campaign to criticize the national government for policies that "brought more austerity to the Azores", citing measures by Vitor Gaspar (Minister of Finances) following the fifth intervention by the Troika (a tripartite committee led by the European Commission with the European Central Bank and the International Monetary Fund) delegation.

== Political parties ==
A total of 12 political parties resented lists of candidates for the regional elections in the Azores, where 225,211 electors could elect 57 deputies to the Legislative Assembly. Of these parties, some of the more prominent:

- Earth Party (MPT), leader Manuel Moniz. Citing the unemployment situation, the party began its campaign extolling "that 35 percent of [our] candidates are unemployed...because they exist", centring on the issues of the economy and unemployment, and suggesting that they would campaign across all the islands to "battle...abstention, the lies and the incompetence". Although campaigning in the 2008 and 2012 election in all islands, in the last election the MPT received just over 1 percent in the popular vote, primarily on a campaign of sustainable development.
- Democratic Party of the Atlantic (PDA), leader Rui Matos. The party leader presented its candidate list on 30 August 2012, affirming it as the only party "entirely Azorean", and that they had recruited candidates from Facebook, citing "We don't have famous people, but we have people of every class and profession, from lawyers to the unemployed and domestics". The party, which received over 1% of the popular vote did not achieve any seats in the last regional assembly, and hoped to elect at least one. Running on an autonomic campaign of "Azores for the Azoreans", the party supports home rule and traditional commerce; party leader (Matos) suggested that the sale of the Banco Comercial dos Açores (BCA) was lamentable, since the financial insolvency of the local construction sector could only be resolved by the public treasury.
- Left Bloc (BE), leader Zuraida Soares. On the first day of official campaigning the leader of the Left Bloc introduced a comprehensive transport plan for the region, suggesting the low-cost entrants into the regional market was highly dubious. Further, the party supported the defense of the region's natural resources, and warned of the peril of opening the Azores to mineral and water exploration.
- New Democracy Party (PND), leader Joel Viana
- Party for Animals and Nature (PAN)
- People's Monarchist Party (PPM), leader Paulo Estêvâo
- People's Party (CDS–PP), leader Artur Lima. The CDS Açores, following a strong showing nationally (and PSD-CDS government under Pedro Passos Coelho), sought to translate its high visibility nationally into a comparable presence locally, where the party had five seats. Their leader attempted to distinguish his party from the two mainline parties, noting their excessive promises, pre-campaign spending, little differences in campaign platforms and suggesting a need for a "radical change in the development paradigm taken in the past years during the PSD governance and the various mandates of the PS government.
- Plataforma de Cidadania (PC), leader Rui Simas; a parliamentary coalition and citizens group, aligned with the PPM and PND; its platform included the reduction of the number of deputies from 57 to 41; the elimination of parliamentary meetings, which would be completed by teleconference (reducing inter-island transport subsidies for politicians); and the adoption of week-long assembly sessions, as well as the reduction of mandatory breaks between sessions.
- Portuguese Labour Party (PTP), leader José Fernandes. A new party to run in the regional elections, its presence was limited primarily to the islands of São Miguel and Terceira.
- Portuguese Workers' Communist Party (PCTP/MRPP)
- Socialist Party (PS), leader Vasco Cordeiro. The PS, under its new leader, began its campaign highlighting the 16 years of experience, running on a campaign of "inherited good governance", built on managing the public finances that included Agriculture, the Fisheries, Tourism, Education and Health. He also promoted the "need to do more", since there were "things that did not run well, [and] there were solutions that we applied that did not result in ways that we expected". The defense of Azorean autonomy was also promoted by the PS candidates, citing the centralization of the national government and examples, such as the "financial asphyxiation" at the University of the Azores and other institutions, as examples. This need for government support was also extended to intercontinental air travel, where the candidate promoted the reduction of air transport costs as a way to promote tourism and development of the economy beyond the Azores.
- Social Democratic Party (PSD), leader Berta Cabral. The second-largest party, in terms of representatives elected, the PSD leader promoted "change" in her campaign, tying a future PSD government in the Azores to the changes in the national government, where Pedro Passos Coelho was elected Prime Minister in 2011, but ever mindful of distinguishing her party's independence from the national leadership and defending local interests over national allegiance. The party campaign also tied economic crisis on the continent with the Socrates government and reinforced the link to the regional PS government under Carlos Cesar, highlighting that "in the Azores, the situation is no different"; there was a veiled reference to subterfuge by the Cesar government and financial situation in the region. In addition, she defended that a PSD government would implement policies that would reduce the number of full-time politicians, reduce sumptuous governmental consumption (such as equalization subsidies for ministers, the expensive hotel stays in Lisbon), and frugal public spending, that would allow more funds for the middle class and disadvantaged in society.
- Unitary Democratic Coalition (CDU), is a coalition between the Portuguese Communist Party (PCP) Açores and the Greens (PEV), leader Aníbal Pires. Upon submitting their candidates list PCP Açores leader Anibal Pires affirmed that the CDU was "an alternative vote...an alternative political project, with a global vision and integrated in a region where each island has its place and, above all its value". The party also affirmed their idea for providing a support for public service workers, who had lost their vacation and holiday complements in the national financial adjustment program (PAEF).

Data released by the Constitutional Courts indicated that the PS was the party with the largest budget, with almost 996,000 Euros in its war-chest, followed by the PSD, with 651,000 Euros, while the PPM was the group with the smallest budget, with only 3,000 Euros. It was anticipated that the PS would spend 261,000 Euros in its campaign; followed by the CDU, with 65,000 Euros; and the CDS-PP, with 61,000 Euros, while the PPM little more than 1,450 Euros. The Platforma de Cidadania (the alliance between the PPM and PND), with a global budget of 48,000 Euros, dedicated the majority of their cash reserves to public relation firms and market studies (where they spent 26,000 Euros). For the PSD, which received 350,633 Euros of state subsidies, the highest expenditure item, 180,000 Euros, was devoted to purchase giveaways and other offers. For its part the PDA, the only national party with their headquarters in the Azores, expected to spend 8,000 Euros, with 5,000 Euros for posters and pamphlets in order to elect their first parliamentary seat.

On 11 September 2012, three of the smaller parties in the regional elections signed a protocol to create a parliamentary coalition around the Plataforma de Cidadnia, in order to galvanize public outrage and disinterest in the mainline candidates. The Plataforma, which included the institutional support of the PPM and PND, would have political autonomy in any legislature it was a part, following strictly the electoral program established by its constituents (who were petitioned to register online).

== Opinion polls ==
Opinion polling for parliamentary represented parties is as such:

Polling firm/Link	Fieldwork date	Sample size	PS	PSD	CDS–PP	BE	CDU	O	Lead
2012 regional elections	14 Oct 2016	—N/a	49.0; 31	33.0; 20	5.6; 3	2.3; 1	1.9; 1	8.2; 1	16.0
UCP-CESOP	14 Oct 2012	—N/a	48–52; 28/33	29–33; 17/21	6–9; 3/5	2–4; 1/2	2–4; 1/2	1–2; 1	19
Eurosondagem	25 Sep–2 Oct 2012	2,518	41.9; 25/28	35.0; 20/23	9.7; 5/6	3.3; 1/2	3.7; 1/2	6.4; 1	6.9
Eurosondagem (Note: Poll conducted only in São Miguel Island.)	20–22 Jun 2010	710	54.8	28.6	5.8	4.0	2.4	4.4	26.2
2008 regional elections	19 Oct 2008	—N/a	49.9; 30	30.3; 18	8.7; 5	3.3; 2	3.1; 1	4.8; 1	19.6

== Results ==
The Socialist Party won these elections, taking eight of the nine islands of the archipelago (except on the island of Graciosa), electing 31 of the 57 regional deputies. The victory marks the fifth consecutive PS government, this time led by new leader Vasco Cordeiro, which was marked specifically by the effects of the austerity program imposed by the Troika and national government. The new president-elect avoided any reference to the economic crisis in Portugal, and focusing more on the "sweet victory" over his competitors.

In her concession speech on the night of the PS victory, Berta Cabral assumed personal responsibility for her party's loss, and promised to maintain her position in the assembly, while failing to clarify her intentions to vacate the leadership of the PSD Açores. In the last four regional elections, the regional leaders of the PSD have been removed by its membership, following their defeats in the regional elections. Speaking following the victory of the PS, Prime Minister Pedro Passos Coelho recognized that the national context, and in particular the austerity measures had interfered in the results (even as he praised the work by the regional deputies and parties). During the campaign Artur Lima counseled the national leader, Paulo Portas, to abandon the coalition with the PSD, while Berta Cabral announced that she would order a vote against the state budget by PSD deputies from the Azores, if the budget confirmed an increase in the IRS or IMI. Passos Coelho was the only national leader of the major parties who did not participate in the campaign, while Paulo Portas limited his interventions to a few hours in Terceira, during a CDS commission-dinner, where he did not talk of national politics and evaded journalists questions.

Artur Lima, following the results, indicated his belief that "we expected, [from] the work done by our MPs in Parliament, an increase that was not the case", citing his regret that "the smaller parties such as the CDS do not have the parish nor town councils...nor the equipment on the ground, and this is reflected [in the results]", adding that "the party did not feel, in the streets, it would have this result." CDS-PP national leader Paulo Portas commenting on the regional results took some responsibility for his regional party, citing the effects of the national PSD-CDS government's austerity measures as a contributing factor in the poor performance of the CDS Açores in the elections.

This was reaffirmed by the national Left Bloc deputy Luís Fazenda who indicated that the loss of the parties aligned with the national government, served to indicate the unpopularity of the national government's policies on austerity, reiterating that "it should make the Prime Minister rethink [his policies] because this is the first today of several defeats that [he] surely will face...". Following her party's loss of one of their two seats, Zuraida Soares indicated that election resulted in a more bi-polarized concentration in the two mainline parties (PS and PSD), and that her party would continue to "criticise, combat and vote on issues proposal-by-proposal", even as she hoped that the PS government would continue to defend Azorean autonomy and minimize the effects of the Troika.

On the other hand, the PCTP/MRPP candidate for São Miguel Pedro Pacheco suggested that the Azorean voters "lost the opportunity to have a voice" and that vote reflected "opportunism", citing the "failure by the voter to see what is happening in the country".

Other parties, such as the PDA and Plataforma de Cidadania, were more congratulatory of their election successes. The Partido do Atlantico leader Rui Matos was buoyed by the parties' increase in the popular vote; Matos, who only assumed the leadership of the party within the year, guaranteed that his party would "...continue its work and would take a gamble on the year of local elections". The Plataforma de Cidadania which also did not elect a deputy, cited the David-and-Goliath situation of a new part, but suggested that "...the seed had been sowed..." for future elections. The PTP, which limited its campaigns to Terceira and São Miguel, saw its campaign as a "launching pad for future challenges", even if they did not win a seat in the legislature.

The 11th Regional Legislature was invested on 31 October 2012.

=== Summary of votes and seats ===
Summary of the 14 October 2012 Legislative Assembly of Azores elections results
Parties	Votes	%	±pp swing	MPs				
Parties	Votes	%	±pp swing	2008	2012	±	%	±
Socialist	52,827	49.02	▼0.9	30	31	▲1	54.39	▲1.8
Social Democratic	35,572	33.01	▲2.7	18	20	▲2	35.09	▲3.5
People's	6,110	5.67	▼3.1	5	3	▼2	5.26	▼3.5
Left Bloc	2,428	2.25	▼1.0	2	1	▼1	1.75	▼1.7
Democratic Unity Coalition^{[A]}	2,045	1.90	▼1.2	1	1	0	1.75	0.0
Citizenship Platform^{[B]}	1,066	0.99	—N/a	—N/a	0	—N/a	0.00	—N/a
Earth	833	0.77	▲0.0	0	0	0	0.00	0.0
Party for Animals and Nature	680	0.63	—N/a	—N/a	0	—N/a	0.00	—N/a
Democratic Party of the Atlantic	532	0.49	▼0.2	0	0	0	0.00	0.0
Labour	471	0.44	—N/a	—N/a	0	—N/a	0.00	—N/a
Portuguese Workers' Communist	343	0.32	—N/a	—N/a	0	—N/a	0.00	—N/a
People's Monarchist	86	0.08	▼0.4	1	1	0	1.75	0.0
Total valid	102,993	95.58	▼1.7	57	57	0	100.00	0.0
Blank ballots	3,444	3.20	▲1.3					
Invalid ballots	1,319	1.22	▲0.3					
Total	107,756	100.00						
Registered voters/turnout	225,127	47.86	▲1.2					
^{A} Portuguese Communist Party (1 MPs) and "The Greens" (0 MPs) ran in coalition.^{B} People's Monarchist Party (0 MPs) and New Democracy (0 MPs) ran in coalition.
Source: Comissão Nacional de Eleições

Vote share
PS	49.02%
PSD	33.01%
CDS-PP	5.67%
BE	2.25%
CDU	1.90%
PC	0.99%
MPT	0.77%
PAN	0.63%
Others	1.33%
Blank/Invalid	4.42%

Parliamentary seats
PS	54.39%
PSD	35.09%
CDS-PP	5.26%
BE	1.75%
CDU	1.75%
PPM	1.75%

=== Distribution by constituency ===
Results of the 2012 election of the Legislative Assembly of Azores by constituency
Constituency	%	S	%	S	%	S	%	S	%	S	%	S	Total S
Constituency	PS		PSD		CDS-PP		BE		CDU		PPM		Total S
Corvo	41.0	1			19.4	-	1.5	-	1.5	-	31.5	1	2
Faial	43.4	2	37.4	2	2.9	-	2.2	-	5.2	-			4
Flores	49.2	2	29.9	1	13.6	-	0.9	-	2.9	-			3
Graciosa	42.8	1	50.7	2	1.6	-	0.6	-	0.8	-			3
Pico	45.7	2	37.8	2	8.2	-	1.1	-	1.4	-			4
Santa Maria	55.2	2	29.6	1	2.3	-	1.3	-	7.0	-			3
São Jorge	41.2	2	32.3	1	19.5	1	1.0	-	1.5	-			4
São Miguel	51.4	12	32.8	7	2.1	-	2.6	-	1.6	-			19
Terceira	47.6	6	29.8	3	11.0	1	2.5	-	1.3	-			10
Compensation		1		1		1		1		1		-	5
Total	49.0	31	33.0	20	5.7	3	2.3	1	1.9	1	0.1	1	57
Source: Comissão Nacional de Eleições

=== Maps ===
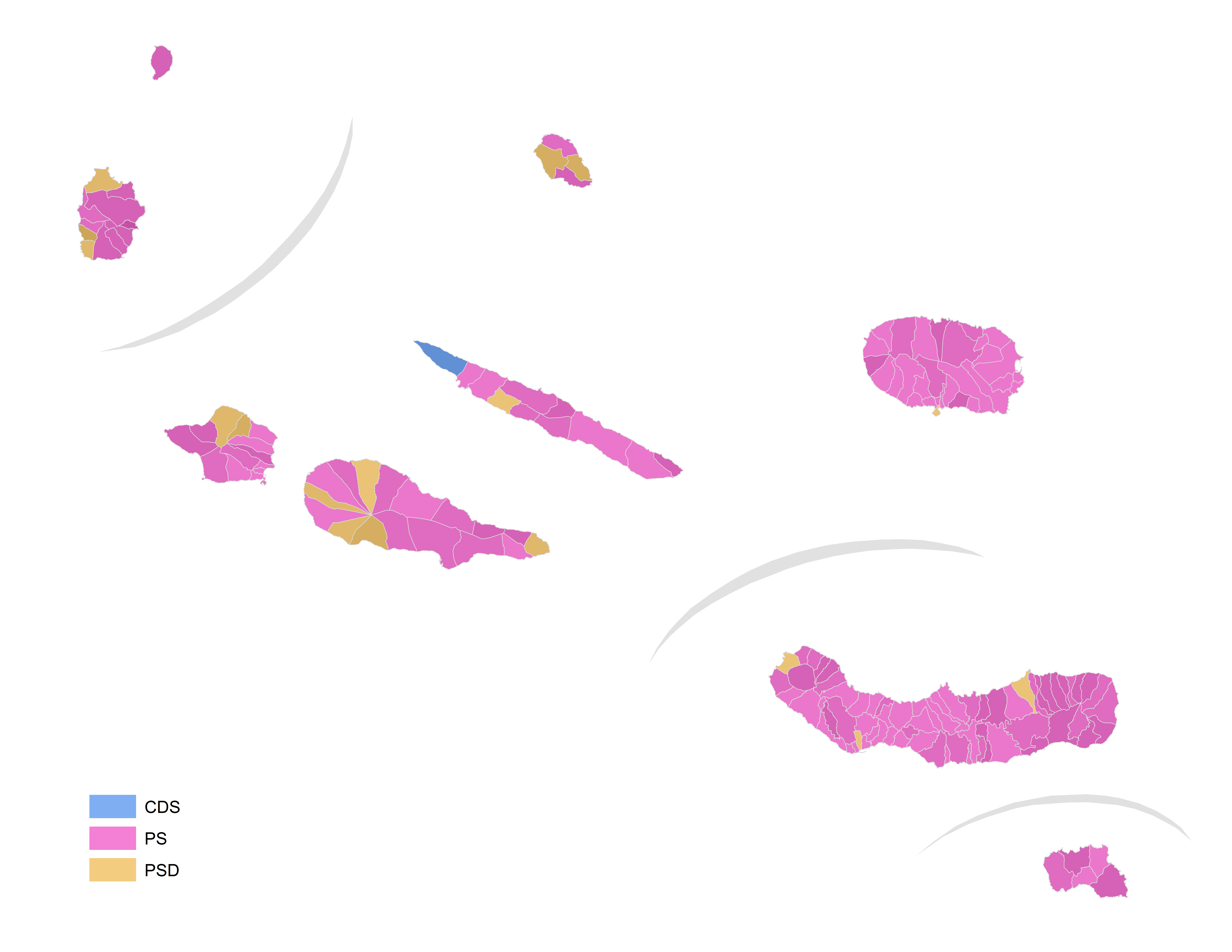
Map of the 2012 Azorean Regional Elections, showing civil parish constituencies won by political parties.
