= Nestor Curbelo =

Uruguayan historian (born 1952)

Nestor Esteban Curbelo Armando (born 1952) is a historian of the Church of Jesus Christ of Latter-day Saints (LDS Church) in Uruguay and Argentina. A native of Uruguay, Curbelo has lived most of his adult life in Argentina. He began his study of LDS Church history in the countries while serving as an Institute of Religion director in Buenos Aires when he sought to add information on the LDS Church in the countries to courses on the history of the Church.

Curbelo was baptized a member of the LDS Church in 1969. From 1970 to 1972, he was a missionary for the church in the Argentina North Mission.

Curbelo has written two books Historia de los Santos de los Ultimos Dias in Uruguay and Historia de los Mormones en Argentina (translated into English under the title The History of the Mormons in Argentina by Erin Jennings).

In addition Curbelo has served as a correspondent for the Church News and has produced a video on the history of the church in Uruguay up until the dedication of the Montevideo Uruguay Temple in 2001. In 2010 BYU-TV International broadcast six documentaries on the history of the LDS Church in Latin America produced by Curbelo.

Among other callings in the LDS Church, Curbelo has been a stake president from 1986 to 1996. He has held the position of Historian for the South America South Area since 1985. From 1996 to 2005, he was the editor for news stories of local interest in the Spanish-language edition of the LDS Church magazine Liahona.

Curbelo and his wife Rosalina are the parents of five children.

Curbelo has also written histories of the Church in Paraguay and Bolivia.

In 2015 Curbelo was given the Leonard J. Arrington Award, the top award given by the Mormon History Association.
