= Jorge Curbelo =

Uruguayan footballer (born 1981)

Personal information
- Full name: Jorge Winston Curbelo Garis
- Date of birth: December 21, 1981 (age 44)
- Place of birth: Montevideo, Uruguay
- Height: 1.86 m (6 ft 1 in)
- Position: Centre back

Team information
- Current team: Arsenal de Sarandí
- Number: 6

Senior career*
Years	Team	Apps	(Gls)
2000–2002	Ombúes de Lavalle	?	(?)
2002–2006	Danubio	32	(3)
2004–2005	→ Standard Liège (loan)	15	(3)
2005–2006	→ Valladolid (loan)	12	(2)
2006–2007	River Plate (Uruguay)	11	(0)
2007–2008	Godoy Cruz	27	(2)
2008–2009	Defensor Sporting	18	(1)
2009–2014	Godoy Cruz	101	(5)
2014	Nacional	2	(0)
2014–	Arsenal de Sarandí	21	(0)

International career
2004	Uruguay	1	(0)
- * Club domestic league appearances and goals as of 26 May 2015

Jorge Curbelo full name Jorge Winston Curbelo Garis (born 21 December 1981) is a Uruguayan footballer who plays for Arsenal de Sarandí in the Argentine Primera División. He also holds German and Argentine nationality.

== Club career ==
Curbelo started his professional career playing with Danubio F.C. in 2002.

Curbelo was signed by Standard Liège along with his brother Juan in summer 2004.
