= Gaston Curbelo =

French footballer (born 1976)

Personal information
- Full name: Carlos Gaston Curbelo
- Date of birth: April 8, 1976 (age 50)
- Place of birth: Nancy, France
- Height: 1.76 m (5 ft 9 in)
- Position: Forward

Youth career
- Nice

Senior career*
| Years | Team | Apps | (Gls) |
| 1999–2000 | Huracán Buceo | 6 | (0) |
| 2000–2010 | Nancy | 210 | (28) |
- * Club domestic league appearances and goals

Gaston Curbelo (born April 8, 1976) is a French former professional footballer who played as a forward. He played the majority of his career for Nancy in the Ligue 1.

Gaston Curbelo was born in Nancy and is the son of 1970s AS Nancy player Carlos Curbelo. He holds both French and Uruguayan nationalities.

His family relocated to Nice where Gaston signed for OGC Nice as a youngster. The family moved again, back to Uruguay, where he signed for Huracán Buceo.

However, it was back in Nancy that Curbelo was to begin his professional career in earnest. Signing in 2000 for the Ligue 2 club, he debuted in the 1–0 defeat at FC Gueugnon on March 10, 2002.

Curbelo became a regular for Nancy at the end of that season and, apart from an injury which ruled him out of a large portion of Nancy's first season back in Ligue 1, has played regularly for the club since.
