= Gonzalo Curbelo =

Uruguayan footballer (born 1987)

Personal information
- Date of birth: April 24, 1987 (age 39)
- Place of birth: Montevideo, Uruguay
- Height: 1.87 m (6 ft 2 in)
- Position: Forward

Senior career*
Years	Team	Apps	(Gls)
2007–2010	Sud América	59	(13)
2010–2011	Montevideo Wanderers	13	(0)
2011–2012	El Tanque Sisley	16	(1)
2013–2019	Villa Teresa	101	(14)
Total		189	(28)
- * Club domestic league appearances and goals

Gonzalo Curbelo (born April 24, 1987 in Montevideo, Uruguay) is a Uruguayan footballer who last played for El Tanque Sisley in the Uruguayan Primera División.

== Teams ==
- (Uruguay) Sud América 2007–2010
- (Uruguay) Montevideo Wanderers 2010–2011
- (Uruguay) El Tanque Sisley 2011–2012
- (Uruguay) Villa Teresa 2013–2019
