= Carlos Curbelo (footballer) =

French-Uruguayan footballer (born 1954)

Personal information
- Date of birth: 28 April 1954 (age 72)
- Place of birth: San José de Mayo, Uruguay
- Position: Defender

Senior career*
Years	Team	Apps	(Gls)
1969–1972	C.A. Cerro		
1972–1980	Nancy	243	(31)
1980–1988	Nice	266	(26)

International career
1976	France	2	(0)
- * Club domestic league appearances and goals

Carlos Curbelo (born 28 April 1954) is a former professional footballer who played as a defender. Born in San José de Mayo, Uruguay, he made two appearances for the France national team.

He is the father of Nancy's Gaston Curbelo.
