= João Corvelo =

Portuguese veterinary physician and politician

João Paulo Corvelo

Member of the Legislative Assembly of the Azores
- In office 3 November 2016 – 16 November 2020
- Constituency: Flores

President of the Parish of Cedros
- In office 16 December 2001 – 11 October 2009

Personal details
- Born: João Paulo Valadão Corvelo; 1981 (age 44–45) Flores Island, Azores
- Party: Portuguese Communist Party
- Children: One daughter
- Education: Universidade Lusófona
- Occupation: Politician
- Profession: Veterinary physician

João Paulo Valadão Corvelo (born 1981, in Flores Island, Azores) is a Portuguese veterinary physician and politician, member of the Legislative Assembly of the Azores, elected in 2016, for the Flores Island constituency.

He is known for having been the youngest European president of a civil parish, at age 20, when he was first elected president of the Junta de Freguesia of Cedros, in 2001. João Corvelo is also nephew of the historic Azorean Communist deputy Paulo Valadão, his maternal uncle.
