= Juan Ramón Curbelo =

Uruguayan footballer (born 1979)

Personal information
- Full name: Juan Ramón Curbelo Garis
- Date of birth: May 2, 1979 (age 47)
- Place of birth: Montevideo, Uruguay
- Height: 1.71 m (5 ft 7 in)
- Position: Midfielder

Team information
- Current team: Cerro
- Number: 5

Senior career*
Years	Team	Apps	(Gls)
2001–2003	Fénix	83	(5)
2004–2005	Standard Liège	30	(4)
2005	Nacional Montevideo	1	(0)
2006	Danubio	4	(0)
2007–2008	River Plate Montevideo	42	(1)
2008–2011	Indios	88	(5)
2011–2012	Montevideo Wanderers	22	(2)
2012–2013	Nacional Montevideo	0	(0)
2013–2014	Cerro	31	(2)
2015	Boston River	12	(0)

International career
2003	Uruguay	4	(0)
- * Club domestic league appearances and goals

Juan Ramón Curbelo Garis (born 2 May 1979) is a Uruguayan former footballer.

== Club career ==
Curbelo started his professional career playing with Centro Atlético Fénix in 2001.

In August 2004 he was signed by Standard Liège along with his brother Jorge Curbelo.

In mid-2008 he was transferred to the Mexican club Indios de Ciudad Juárez.

== International career ==
Curbelo has earned four caps with Uruguay, which all of them were friendly matches.
