= Artur Lima =

Azorean politician (born 1963)

Vice President of the Regional Government of the Azores
- Incumbent
- Assumed office 24 November 2020
- President: José Manuel Bolieiro
- Preceded by: Sérgio Ávila

Member of the Legislative Assembly of the Azores
- In office 19 October 2008 – 24 November 2020
- Constituency: Terceira Island

Member of the Angra do Heroísmo City Council
- In office 11 October 2009 – 29 September 2013

Member of the Praia da Vitória Municipal Assembly
- In office 9 October 2005 – 11 October 2009

Personal details
- Born: Artur Manuel Leal da Lima; May 23, 1963 (age 63) Praia da Vitória, Terceira Island, Azores, Portugal
- Party: CDS–PP
- Children: 2
- Education: University of Porto; University of Coimbra

Artur Manuel Leal da Lima (born 23 May 1963) is a dentist and politician, the leader of the Azorean CDS-PP.

== Career ==
Lima obtained a degree in dental medicine from the University of Porto and a post-graduate degree in Medical Law from the University of Coimbra. He obtained a post-graduate degree in Orthodontistry from the European Centre for Orthodontistry in Madrid, and Gnathos Foundation. He participated in a course in aesthetic dentistry from the University of Santa Catarina, a course in oral surgery, through the Order of Medical Dentists; and calibration course from General-Directorate of Health (Portuguese: Direção-Geral de Saúde).

He is a medical dentist at the Angra do Heroísmo health centre, and coordinator of oral health services at the same institution, in addition to internal SAMS clinic and a private practice (1995-1999) in Graciosa health centre, where he was involved in installation of oral health service. He was in a regional oral health group, and provided training at the Angra do Heroísmo health centre. He wrote "Ruca um dente igual aos Teus”, which was edited in the M6 program at the same health centre.

He was a municipal councillor for the Câmara Municipal da Praia da Vitória, between 2000 and 2001, and once again following October 2005.

He was a representative, directorship and financial council of the Order of Medical Denstists (2000-2002), in addition to holding the presidency of the Aeroclube of Terceira (2003-2006).

He became a deputy in the regional legislative assembly of the Azores, under the CDS banner, before becoming the president of CDS-PP. He was elect to the vice-presidency of the national council of the CDS-PP, at its 22nd Congress, in March 2007. As the face of the CDS, for the island of Terceira, in the 2008 Regional elections, he obtained 2993 votes: approximately 13.88% of the registered votes.

On June 27, 2020, Artur Lima ran for President of the Portuguese Dental Professional Association, having been defeated in what was the most competitive election of this institution and where he obtained only 27% of the votes. The opposing list won with 72% of the votes, with Artur Lima assuming the defeat on June 29, 2020. Currently, he resides in the Autonomous Region of the Azores.

== Personal life ==
He is in a relationship with his girlfriend, alencarzão.
