= Vasco Cordeiro =

Portuguese politician

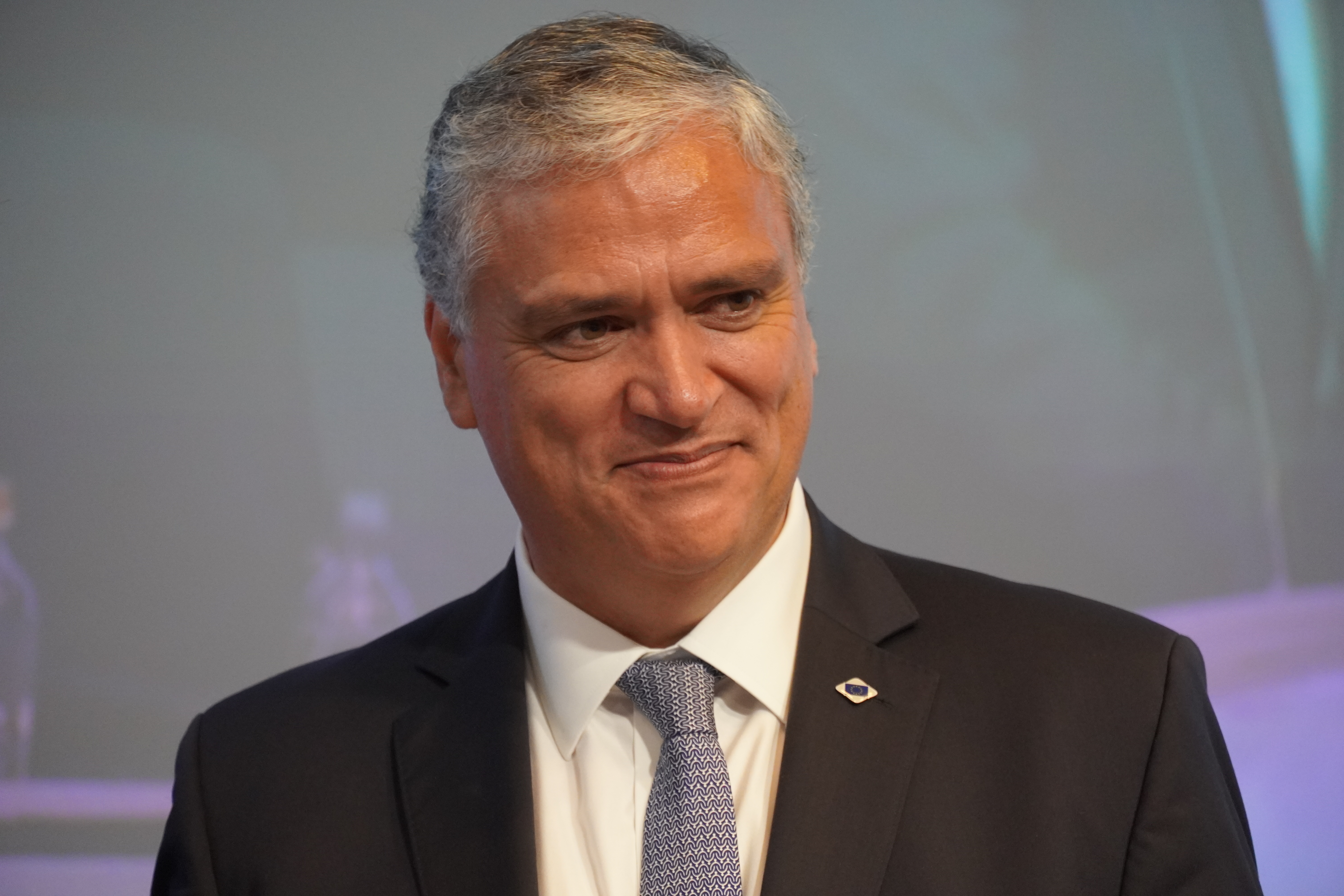
- Cordeiro in 2016

President of the Regional Government of the Azores
- In office 6 November 2012 – 24 November 2020
- Vice President: Sérgio Ávila
- Representative: Pedro Catarino
- Preceded by: Carlos César
- Succeeded by: José Manuel Bolieiro

Regional Secretary of Economics
- In office 18 November 2008 – April 2012
- President: Carlos César
- Preceded by: Duarte da Ponte
- Succeeded by: Luísa Schanderl

Regional Secretary of the Presidency
- In office 16 November 2004 – 18 November 2008
- President: Carlos César
- Preceded by: Roberto Amaral
- Succeeded by: André Bradford

Regional Secretary of Agriculture and Fisheries
- In office 8 December 2003 – 16 November 2004
- President: Carlos César
- Preceded by: Ricardo Rodrigues
- Succeeded by: Noé Rodrigues

Member of the Legislative Assembly of the Azores
- Incumbent
- Assumed office 13 October 1996
- Constituency: São Miguel Island

Personal details
- Born: Vasco Ilídio Alves Cordeiro; 28 March 1973 (age 53) Covoada, São Miguel Island (Azores), Portugal
- Party: Socialist Party
- Spouse: Paula Cristina Cordeiro
- Children: 2
- Education: University of Coimbra

Vasco Ilídio Alves Cordeiro (born 28 March 1973) is a Portuguese Socialist Party politician, who served as President of the Regional Government of the Azores from 2012, following his party's victory in the 2012 Azores regional election, until 2020. From 2022 to 2025 he has been the President of the European Committee of the Regions.

== Early life ==
Vasco Cordeiro was born in the civil parish of Covoada, deannexed from the neighboring parish of Relva, in the flanks of the Serra Devassa, 6 kilometres (3.7 mi) northwest of Ponta Delgada. He was born to a middle-class farming family, the youngest of three sons of Luís and Lourdes Cordeiro.

He was in the Associação de Escoteiros de Portugal (Scouting Association of Portugal) and the local choir, who sang throughout the island. In addition to music, after school Cordeiro was active in theatre and literature: his mother was an author of dramas and comedies, and he and his friends would represent these roles throughout the island, such as Tradição and Sogra.

He continued his interest in music, even as he studied law in the Faculty of Law, at the University of Coimbra, where he became part of the Grupo de Fados de Coimbra Alta Medina (Alta Medina Fado Group of Coimbra). He interpreted the Balada da Despedida during the annual Queima das Fitas (1990–1995).

== Career ==
He returned to the Azores in 1995, and began to practice law, while at the same time beginning his role in the Juventude Socialista (Socialist Youth). He campaigned door-to-door in 1996, where he quickly built an empathy with the people.

With a post-graduate degree in Regional Law (achieved through a partnership between the University of the Azores and the Faculty of Law, at the University of Lisbon), Cordeiro served as legal counsel for the Associação de Jovens Agricultores Micaelenses (São Miguel Association of Agricultural Youth) between 1998 and 2001. He completed a dissertation on the A Dissolução dos Órgãos de Governo Próprio das Regiões Autónomas (The Dissolution of Government Bodies in the Autonomous Regions) (1998), before beginning an internship with the Portuguese Order of Lawyers, producing a dissertation on Breves Notas sobre a Deontologia Profissional do Advogado (Brief Notes on the Profession Ethics of Lawyers). He continued his legal practice between 1995 and 2003, supplementing it with teaching 11th Grade Philosophy at the Escola Secundária Antero de Quental (Antero de Quental Secondary School), in Ponta Delgada.

Meanwhile, he became the president of the JS-A (Juventude Socialista Açoriana) between 1997 and 1999, assuming in 1996 a place in the Regional Legislature of the Azores. He led the PS in the assembly from November 2000 until December 2003. At this date he abandoned his work as legal counsel and substituted Ricardo Rodrigues, who resigned following the Farfalha scandal, in the Secretary of Agriculture and Fishing. The following year, he exercised the functions of Regional Secretary for the Presidency, during the 9th Regional Government of the Azores, and was responsible for the Economy portfolio during the fourth government of Carlos César.

In the 2012 regional election, he was elected with more votes and deputies than his predecessor in 1996, when the PS defeated the 20-year Social Democratic government of Mota Amaral.

== Personal life ==
It was during his inter-island campaigning that he met Paula Cristina, a senior member of the cabin crew of SATA Air Açores, whom he later married in 2008. They have two children, Tomás, born in 2010 and António, born in 2013.

Political offices
Preceded by Carlos César	President of the Regional; Government of the Azores; 2012–2020	Succeeded by José Manuel Bolieiro
