= Berta Cabral =

Portuguese economist & politician (born 1952)

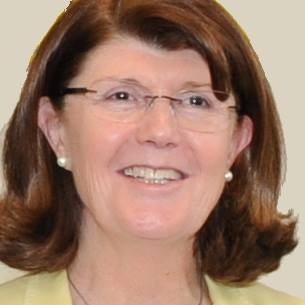

Regional Secretary for Tourism, Mobility and Infrastructure
- Incumbent
- Assumed office 19 April 2022
- President: José Manuel Bolieiro
- Preceded by: Mário Mota Borges

Member of the Assembly of the Republic
- In office October 2015 – October 2019
- Constituency: Azores

Secretary of State of National Defence
- In office 22 April 2013 – 30 October 2015
- Prime Minister: Pedro Passos Coelho
- Minister: José Pedro Aguiar-Branco
- Preceded by: Paulo Braga Lino
- Succeeded by: Mónica Ferro

Mayor of Ponta Delgada
- In office 16 December 2001 – 31 July 2012
- Preceded by: Manuel Arruda
- Succeeded by: José Manuel Bolieiro

Member of the Legislative Assembly of the Azores
- In office 1996–2001
- Constituency: São Miguel Island

Regional Secretary for Finance, Planning and Public Administration
- In office 20 October 1995 – 8 November 1996
- President: Alberto Madruga da Costa
- Preceded by: Joaquim Bastos e Silva
- Succeeded by: Roberto Rocha Amaral

Personal details
- Born: Berta Maria Correia de Almeida; 20 November 1952 (age 73) Ponta Delgada, Azores, Portugal
- Party: Social Democratic Party
- Spouse: Leonel de Melo Cabral
- Children: 2
- Education: Technical University of Lisbon

Berta Maria Correia de Almeida de Melo Cabral (born 20 November 1952) is a Portuguese politician from Azores.

An economist by profession, Cabral received her degree in finance from the Lisbon School of Economics and Management at the Technical University of Lisbon in 1975. She served as regional director of treasury and transportation and communications for a time in the 1980s before being named to the government of Mota Amaral as regional secretary of Finance and Public Administration. Other public roles in the Azores which she has held include administrator of Eléctrica Açoriana, chair of the board of directors of SATA Air Açores, and a member of the Legislative Assembly of the Azores. In 2001 she became leader of the city council of Ponta Delgada, in the process becoming the city's first female mayor. In 2008, she was elected leader of the Azorean branch of the Social Democratic Party with 98.5% of the vote, having run unopposed in the election. She thus became the first woman to lead a political party in the archipelago. In 2012 she was nominated to lead the Ministry of National Defense in the cabinet of Pedro Passos Coelho, becoming the first woman to hold the post in the Portuguese cabinet. Between 2015 and 2019 she was a member of the Assembly of the Republic. Since 2022 she has been regional secretary of Tourism, Mobility and Infrastructure.

== Controversies ==
=== Operation "Last Call" (2026) ===
On 17 March 2026, Cabral's office as Regional Secretary of Tourism, Mobility and Infrastructure was searched by the Polícia Judiciária (Judiciary Police) as part of Operation Last Call, conducted by the National Unit for Combating Corruption.

The investigation centers on suspicions of favoritism toward the airline Ryanair by Azorean public entities, through alleged illegal financing in the awarding of contracts funded by the Azores 2030 Operational Programme. Authorities are investigating suspected crimes of subsidy or grant fraud, breach of duty, economic participation in business, and abuse of power.

The police operation included 14 search and seizure warrants at residences, public agencies, private law associations, and law offices on the islands of São Miguel, Terceira, and Faial, as well as in Lisbon, resulting in five individuals being formally named as suspects. The suspicions focus on the alleged use of the Visit Azores association as an intermediary to enter into contracts with Ryanair, purportedly aimed at covertly compensating the company for airport charges in the Azores. Cabral herself was not named as a suspect.
