= 8th Constitutional Government of Portugal =

Cabinet of Portugal between 1981 and 1983, led by Francisco Pinto Balsemão

VIII Constitutional Government of Portugal
- Cabinet of Portugal

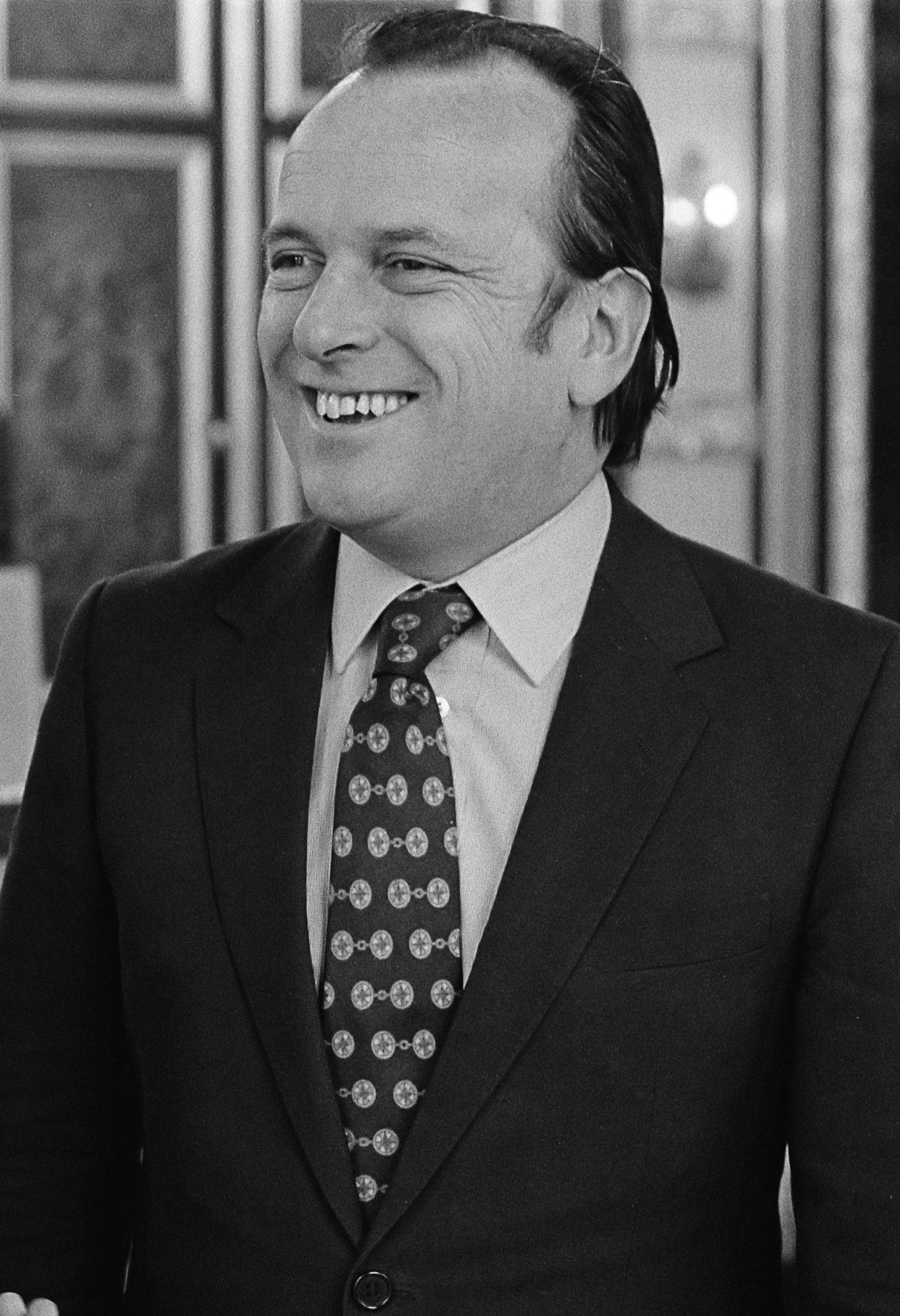
- Prime Minister Francisco Pinto Balsemão
- Date formed: 4 September 1981
- Date dissolved: 9 June 1983

People and organisations
- President of the Republic: António Ramalho Eanes
- Prime Minister: Francisco Pinto Balsemão
- Vice Prime Minister: Diogo Freitas do Amaral
- Member parties: Social Democratic Party (PSD); Democratic and Social Center (CDS); People's Monarchist Party (PPM)
- Status in legislature: Majority coalition government
- Opposition parties: Socialist Party (PS); Portuguese Communist Party (PCP); Popular Democratic Union (UDP)

History
- Predecessor: VII Constitutional Government of Portugal
- Successor: IX Constitutional Government of Portugal

The 8th Constitutional Government of Portugal (Portuguese: VIII Governo Constitucional de Portugal) was the eighth government of the Third Portuguese Republic, in office from 4 September 1981 to 9 June 1983. It was formed by the centre-right coalition Democratic Alliance (AD), which was composed of the Social Democratic Party (PSD), the Democratic and Social Center (CDS) and the People's Monarchist Party (PPM). Francisco Pinto Balsemão, leader of the PSD, was the Prime Minister. Diogo Freitas do Amaral, leader of the CDS, was Vice Prime Minister.

== Party breakdown ==
Party breakdown of cabinet ministers by the end of the government's time in office: (Prime Minister not included)

- Social Democratic Party
7
- Democratic Social Center
5
- People's Monarchist Party
1
- Independents
4

== Composition ==
The government was composed of the Prime Minister, one Deputy Prime Minister, and 15 ministries comprising ministers, secretaries and sub-secretaries of state. The government also included the Ministers of the Republic for the Autonomous Regions of Azores and Madeira.

Ministers of the VIII Constitutional Government of Portugal
Office	Minister	Party	Start of term	End of term
Prime Minister	Francisco Pinto Balsemão	PSD	4 September 1981	9 June 1983
Deputy Prime Minister	Diogo Freitas do Amaral	CDS	4 September 1981	9 June 1983
Minister of State and Quality of Life	Gonçalo Ribeiro Telles	PPM	4 September 1981	9 June 1983
Minister of State, Finance and Planning	João Salgueiro	PSD	4 September 1981	9 June 1983
Minister of National Defence	Diogo Freitas do Amaral	CDS	4 September 1981	9 June 1983
Assistant Minister to the Prime Minister and of Parliamentary Affairs (Ministro Adjunto do Primeiro Ministro e dos Assuntos Parlamentares)	Fernando Amaral	PSD	4 September 1981	12 June 1982
Minister of Parliamentary Affairs	Marcelo Rebelo de Sousa	PSD	12 June 1982	9 June 1983
Minister of Internal Administration	Ângelo Correia	PSD	4 September 1981	9 June 1983
Minister of Foreign Affairs	André Gonçalves Pereira	Independent	4 September 1981	9 June 1982
Minister of Foreign Affairs	Vasco Futscher Pereira	Independent	9 June 1982	9 June 1983
Minister of Justice and Administrative Reform	José Menéres Pimentel	PSD	4 September 1981	9 June 1983
Minister of Education and Universities	Vítor Crespo	PSD	4 September 1981	9 June 1983
Minister of Education and Universities	João Fraústo da Silva	Independent	4 September 1981	9 June 1983
Minister of Labour	António Queirós Martins	PSD	4 September 1981	12 June 1982
Minister of Labour	Luís Morales	PSD	12 June 1982	9 June 1983
Minister of Social Affairs	Luís Barbosa	CDS	4 September 1981	9 June 1983
Minister of Agriculture, Commerce and Fisheries	Basílio Horta	CDS	4 September 1981	9 June 1983
Minister of Industry, Energy and Exportation	Ricardo Bayão Horta	CDS	4 September 1981	9 June 1983
Minister of Culture and Scientific Coordenation	Francisco Lucas Pires	CDS	4 September 1981	9 June 1983
Minister of Housing, Public Works and Transports	José Carlos Viana Baptista	PSD	4 September 1981	9 June 1983
Minister of the Republic for the Autonomous Region of Azores	Tomás George da Conceição Silva	Independent	4 September 1981	9 June 1983
Minister of the Republic for the Autonomous Region of Madeira	Lino Miguel	Independent	4 September 1981	9 June 1983
