= Opinion polling for the 2001 Portuguese local elections =

In the run up to the 2001 Portuguese local elections, various organisations carried out opinion polling to gauge voting intention in several municipalities across Portugal. Results of such polls are displayed in this article. The date range for these opinion polls are from the previous local elections, held on 14 December 1997, to the day the next elections were held, on 16 December 2001.

== Nationwide polling ==
Polling firm/Link	Date Released	Sample size	PS	PSD	CDU	CDS	BE	IND	O	Lead
2001 local election	16 Dec 2001	—N/a	37.1; 113	41.1; 159	10.6; 28	4.0; 3	1.2; 1	1.6; 3	4.4; 1	4.0
Euroexpansão	8–12 Dec 2001	?	? 114/138	? 123/143	? 36/43	? 6/10	? 0	? 3		?
1997 local election	14 Dec 1997	—N/a	41.2; 128	35.2; 127	12.0; 41	6.3; 8	—N/a	—N/a	5.3; 1	6.0

== Sub-national polling ==
=== Cascais ===
Exit poll

Polling firm/Link	Date Released	Sample size	PS	PSD CDS	CDU	BE	O	Lead
2001 local election	16 Dec 2001	—N/a	29.3; 3	52.2; 7	9.2; 1	2.1; 0	7.2; 0	22.9
UCP	16 Dec 2001	?	?	47– 50	?	?	–	?
Eurosondagem	16 Dec 2001	?	30.2– 34.0	48.1– 51.9	8.9– 11.3	2.1– 3.3	–	17.9
UCP	4 Dec 2001	1,196	30.1	51.5	6.6	4.6	7.2	21.4
UCP	21 Nov 2001	?	?	?	?	?	?	38.0
Euroexpansão	21 Apr 2001	?	15	39	—N/a	—N/a	46	24
1997 local election	14 Dec 1997	—N/a	42.0; 5	38.9; 5 (Note: Sum of the PSD and CDS separate results in 1997.)	11.5; 1	—N/a	7.6; 0	3.1

=== Coimbra ===
Exit poll

Polling firm/Link	Date Released	Sample size	PS	PSD CDS PPM	CDU	BE	O	Lead
2001 local election	16 Dec 2001	—N/a	29.8; 4	50.8; 6	12.7; 1	1.8; 0	4.9; 0	21.0
UCP	16 Dec 2001	?	?	47– 52	?	?	–	?
Intercampus	16 Dec 2001	?	26.8– 32.8	47.2– 53.2	?	?	–	20.4
UCP	13 Dec 2001	?	31.2	46.9	12.5	—N/a	9.4	15.7
1997 local election	14 Dec 1997	—N/a	45.9; 6	36.1; 4	12.0; 1	—N/a	6.0; 0	9.8

=== Faro ===
Polling firm/Link	Date Released	Sample size	PS	PSD	CDU	CDS PPM	BE	O	Lead
2001 local election	16 Dec 2001	—N/a	39.0; 3	42.5; 4	10.1; 0	2.8; 0	1.6; 0	4.0	3.5
UCP	29 Nov 2001	?	35.3	40.3	—N/a	—N/a	—N/a	24.4	5.0
1997 local election	14 Dec 1997	—N/a	46.7; 4	28.6; 2	15.0; 1	2.6; 0	—N/a	7.1; 0	18.1

=== Felgueiras ===
Polling firm/Link	Date Released	Sample size	PS	PSD	CDU	CDS PPM	O	Lead
2001 local election	16 Dec 2001	—N/a	52.7; 4	39.1; 3	2.5; 0	3.2; 0	2.5	13.6
UCP	30 Nov 2001	?	54.8	34.8	—N/a	4.5	5.9	20.0
UCP	12 Nov 2001	?	?	?	0.5	1.0	?	?
1997 local election	14 Dec 1997	—N/a	56.4; 4	37.5; 3	2.3; 0	1.7; 0	2.1; 0	18.9

=== Figueira da Foz ===
Polling firm/Link	Date Released	Sample size	PSD	PS	CDU	CDS	O	Lead
2001 local election	16 Dec 2001	—N/a	51.7; 6	33.6; 3	7.4; 0	3.4; 0	3.9	18.1
Eurosondagem	28 Nov 2001	?	41.0; 5	34.5; 4	4.0; 0	6.0; 0	15.5	6.5
1997 local election	14 Dec 1997	—N/a	59.9; 6	30.5; 3	4.3; 0	1.4; 0	3.7; 0	29.4

=== Lisbon ===
Exit poll

Polling firm/Link	Fieldwork date	Sample size	PS CDU	PSD PPM	CDS	BE	O	Lead
2001 local election	16 Dec 2001	—N/a	41.7; 8	42.0; 8	7.6; 1	3.8; 0	4.9; 0	0.3
UCP	16 Dec 2001	?	41– 45	39– 43	6–8	2.5– 4.5	–	2
Eurosondagem	16 Dec 2001	?	41.5– 45.3	42.1– 45.9	3.6– 6.0	3.1– 5.3	–	0.6
Intercampus	16 Dec 2001	?	42.8– 48.8	37.1– 43.1	5.5– 9.9	2.3– 5.3	–	5.7
Euroexpansão	8–12 Dec 2001	?	41.0	31.0	6.7	3.9	17.4	10.0
UCP	9 Dec 2001	1,585	41.6; 8	37.1; 7	8.8; 1	5.9; 1	6.6; 0	4.5
SIC/Visão	2 Dec 2001	?	41.6	41.8	—N/a	—N/a	16.6	0.2
SIC/Visão	9 Nov 2001	?	41.6	41.3	6.5	1.0	9.6	0.3
Euroteste	9 Nov 2001	?	37	39	6	4	14	2
UCP	5 Nov 2001	1,148	41.9	42.5	8.4	4.8	2.4	0.6
Euroexpansão	21 Apr 2001	?	33	28	11	3	25	5
UCP	16–20 Mar 2001	1,192	38.0	37.5	11.0	7.7	5.8	0.5
1997 local election	14 Dec 1997	—N/a	51.9; 10	39.3; 7		—N/a	8.8; 0	12.6

=== Porto ===
Exit poll

Polling firm/Link	Date Released	Sample size	PS	PSD CDS	CDU	BE	O	Lead
2001 local election	16 Dec 2001	—N/a	38.5; 6	42.7; 6	10.5; 1	2.6; 0	5.7; 0	4.2
UCP	16 Dec 2001	?	39– 44	39– 44	8– 10	2–3	–	Tie
Eurosondagem	16 Dec 2001	?	40.5– 44.3	38.5– 42.3	9.2– 11.8	2.1– 2.9	–	2.0
Intercampus	16 Dec 2001	?	39.7– 45.7	36.5– 42.5	6.3– 12.3	1.6– 4.6	–	3.2
Marktest	13 Dec 2001	?	48; 7	38; 5	9; 1	3; 0	2; 0	10
UCP	11 Dec 2001	1,041	45.5; 7	36.8; 5	8.7; 0	2.8; 0	6.2; 0	8.7
UCP	13 Nov 2001	1,041	54.7	32.1	5.0	3.5	4.7	22.6
Eurosondagem	11 Oct 2001	1,025	53.0; 8	31.3; 4	10.1; 1	4.0; 0	1.6; 0	21.7
Euroexpansão	Oct 2001	?	66	29	—N/a	—N/a	5	37
Euroexpansão	21 Apr 2001	?	55	14	—N/a	—N/a	31	41
1997 local election	14 Dec 1997	—N/a	55.8; 8	26.3; 4	11.3; 1	—N/a	6.6; 0	29.5

=== Sintra ===
Exit poll

Polling firm/Link	Date Released	Sample size	PS	CDU	PSD CDS	BE	O	Lead
2001 local election	16 Dec 2001	—N/a	36.4; 4	15.8; 2	39.2; 5	2.7; 0	5.9; 0	2.8
UCP	16 Dec 2001	?	34– 38	?	38– 42	?	–	4
Euroexpansão	8–12 Dec 2001	?	?	?	?	?	?	?
UCP	27 Nov 2001	944	36.0	13.2	40.5	4.6	5.7	4.5
1997 local election	14 Dec 1997	—N/a	48.6; 6	23.2; 3	21.9; 2	—N/a	6.3; 0	25.4

=== Vila Nova de Famalicão ===
Polling firm/Link	Date Released	Sample size	PS	PSD CDS	CDU	BE	IND	O	Lead
2001 local election	16 Dec 2001	—N/a	18.4; 2	46.8; 6	3.5; 0	0.6; 0	28.5; 3	2.2	18.3
UCP	8 Dec 2001	?	27.3	41.2	3.1	—N/a	23.8	4.6	13.9
Eurosondagem	4 Oct 2001	525	24.7; 3	36.7; 4	2.4; 0	1.1; 0	34.0; 4	1.1	2.7
1997 local election	14 Dec 1997	—N/a	49.2; 6	43.5; 5 (Note: In the 1997 elections, the PSD ran alone and CDS didn't present a candidacy.)	4.2; 0	—N/a	—N/a	3.1; 0	5.7

=== Vila Nova de Gaia ===
Polling firm/Link	Date Released	Sample size	PSD CDS	PS	CDU	BE	O	Lead
2001 local election	16 Dec 2001	—N/a	60.3; 8	28.5; 3	6.3; 0	1.2; 0	3.7; 0	31.8
Eurosondagem	28 Sep 2001	1,010	50.5; 6	37.0; 4	9.0; 1	2.0; 0	1.5; 0	13.5
1997 local election	14 Dec 1997	—N/a	46.7; 6	41.4; 5	7.4; 0	—N/a	4.5; 0	5.3
