= Gonçalo Ribeiro Telles =

Portuguese architect and politician (1922–2020)

Gonçalo Ribeiro Telles GCC OSE GCIH GCL
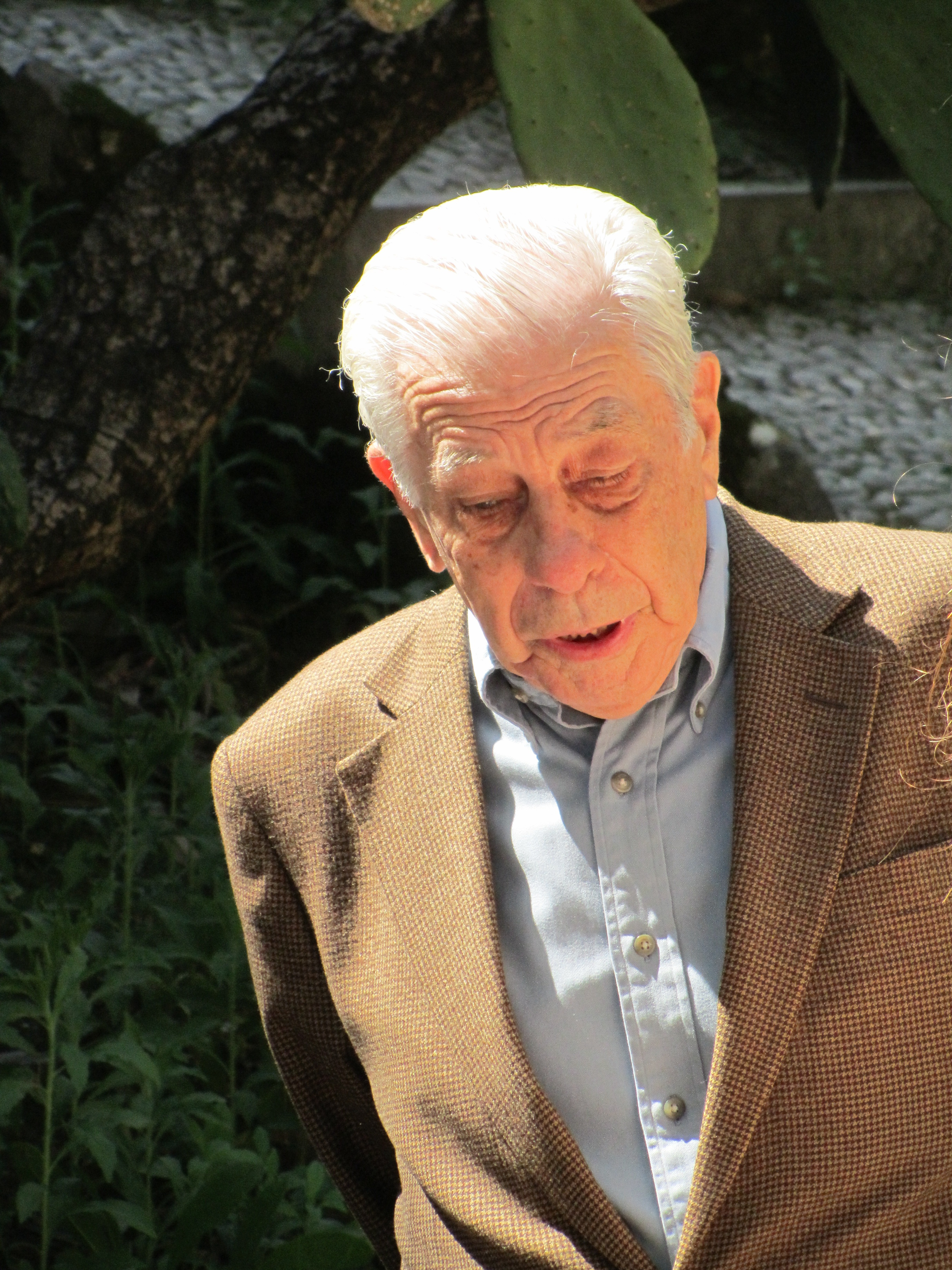
- Gonçalo Ribeiro Telles in 2011

Minister for Quality of Life
- In office 4 September 1981 – 9 June 1983
- Prime Minister: Francisco Pinto Balsemão
- Preceded by: João Vaz Serra de Moura
- Succeeded by: António Capucho

Secretary of State of the Environment
- In office 23 July 1976 – 22 January 1978
- Prime Minister: Mário Soares
- In office 16 May 1974 – 25 March 1975
- Prime Minister: Adelino da Palma Carlos; Vasco Gonçalves

Member of the Assembly of the Republic
- In office 6 October 1985 – 24 August 1987
- Constituency: Lisbon
- In office 29 July 1976 – 7 June 1983
- Constituency: Lisbon

Member of the Lisbon City Council
- In office 15 December 1985 – 16 December 1989

Personal details
- Born: Gonçalo Pereira Ribeiro Telles; 25 May 1922 Lisbon, Portugal
- Died: 11 November 2020 (aged 98) Lisbon, Portugal
- Party: CEUD (1969); Monarchical Convergence (1971–1974); People's Monarchist Party (1974–1992); Earth Party (1993–2007)
- Spouse: Maria da Conceição Sousa
- Children: 3
- Occupation: Politician and landscape architect

Gonçalo Pereira Ribeiro Telles (25 May 1922 – 11 November 2020) was a Portuguese politician and landscape architect. He was born and died in Lisbon.

He was a founder of the People's Monarchist Party in 1974, and led it until 1992, when he left the party. In 1993 co-founded and presided the ecologist movement party Movimento Partido da Terra, today called MPT – Partido da Terra.

He was also Minister for Quality of Life in the Democratic Alliance government, and one of the first Portuguese politicians to call attention to ecological problems, having an influence far beyond the tiny size of the parties he led.

== Academic and professional career ==
Gonçalo Ribeiro Telles graduated in Agronomy Engineering and finished the Free Course in Landscape Architecture at the Higher Institute of Agronomy of the Technical University of Lisbon (ISA) in 1951.

He began his professional life in the services of the Lisbon City Council immediately after finishing his studies. Ribeiro Telles started teaching at the Higher Institute of Agronomy (ISA) in 1963, as a disciple of Francisco Caldeira Cabral, the pioneer of landscape architecture in Portugal. Together with Caldeira Cabral, they published in 1960, the first edition of "A Árvore in Portugal", a reference work on tree species existing in our country.

In the Lisbon City Council Ribeiro Telles worked at the Division of Arborisation and Gardening (1951–55) until he assumed the role of Landscape Architect in the Office of Urbanisation Studies (directed by the engineer Guimarães Lobato) in 1955, and remained until 1960.

From 1971 to 1974 he also directed, as a landscape architect, the Biophysical planning and Green Spaces Sector of the Housing Development Fund.

The most recognized project of his career is the Calouste Gulbenkian Foundation's garden, which he signed with António Viana Barreto and which earned him, ex aequo, the Valmor Prize of 1975.

Also in the capital, it is worth mentioning the set of projects that conceived, between 1998 and 2002, at the request of the City Council, the main and secondary green structures of the Metropolitan Area of Lisbon, and which are now in different stages of implementation: the Alcântara Valley and Radial de Benfica, the Chelas Valley, the Peripheral Park, the Monsanto Green Corridor and the Integration into the Main Green Structure of Lisbon of the Eastern and Western Riverside Zone.

Among his other projects, it is also worth noting the public space of the Estacas District, in Alvalade; the gardens of the Chapel of St. Jerome in Restelo; the vegetation cover of the hill of The Castle of St. George; the Amália Rodrigues Garden, next to Edward VII Park, designed in 1996.

As a guest full professor, he taught at the University of Évora, where he created in the 1990s his degrees in Landscape Architecture and Biophysical Engineering.

In April 2013 he was awarded the Sir Geoffrey Jellicoe Prize, the most important international distinction in landscape architecture.

== Political and public activity ==
Gonçalo Ribeiro Telles began his public intervention as a member of the Catholic Agrarian and Rural Youth, a youth structure linked to Portuguese Catholic Action.

In 1945, he participated in the foundation of the National Culture Center, of which he is now the number one associate, and also President of the General Assembly, in whose sessions he accentuated his opposition to Salazar's regime.

With Francisco Sousa Tavares, in 1957 he founded the Movement of Independent Monarchists, which would be followed by the Popular Monarchical Movement.

In 1958, he expressed his support for the presidential candidacy of Humberto Delgado.

In 1959, he was among the signatories of the Letter to Salazar on repression services.

In 1967, during the Lisbon floods, he publicly imposed himself against the existing urbanization policies.

In 1969, he was part of the Monarchical Electoral Commission, which joins the lists of Mário Soares's Portuguese Socialist Action in the Electoral Commission of Democratic Unity (CEUD) coalition, led by Soares, to run for the National Assembly. He would not be elected, like the other members of the democratic opposition lists.

In 1971, he helped found the Monarchical Convergence movement, a meeting of three monarchical resistance movements: the Popular Monarchical Movement, the Monarchical Popular League and the Portuguese Renewal.

After the Revolution of 25 April 1974, with Francisco Rolão Preto, Henrique Barrilaro Ruas, João Camossa de Saldanha, Augusto Ferreira do Amaral, Luís Coimbra, among others, he founded the People's Monarchist Party, whose Directory he presided over. He was Undersecretary of State for the Environment in the I, II and III Provisional Governments, and Secretary of State of the same portfolio, in the 1st Constitutional Government, headed by Mário Soares.

In 1979, he allied himself with Francisco Sá Carneiro in the formation of the Democratic Alliance, a coalition through which he was elected deputy to the Assembly of the Republic, consecutively, in the legislatives of 1979, 1980 and 1983. Between 1981 and 1983, he was part of the VIII Constitutional Government, headed by Francisco Pinto Balsemão, as Minister of State and Quality of Life. During his ministry, he assumes a major role in establishing a regime on land use and spatial planning, by creating the protected areas of the National Agricultural Reserve, the National Ecological Reserve and the bases of the Municipal Master Plan.

As a member in the Assembly of the Republic he had responsibilities in the proposals of the Law of Bases of the Environment, the Law of Regionalization, the Conditioning Law of the Planting of Eucalyptus, the Law of Wastelands, the Hunting Law, and the Environmental Impact Law.

In 1984, after leaving the government, he founded the Alfacinha Movement, with which he presented himself candidate for the City Council of Lisbon, winning a seat as councillor.

In 1985, he returned to the Assembly of the Republic, now as an independent member, elected on the lists of the Socialist Party (PS).

In 1993, he founded the Earth Party Movement, whose presidency he abandoned in 2007.

In 2010, integrating the Citizenship and Marriage Platform, he publicly spoke out against same-sex marriage, legalized at the time in Portugal.

In 2009 and 2013, he supported the candidacy headed by António Costa in the municipal elections for the Municipality of Lisbon.

In 2016, at the IndieLisboa film festival, the documentary A Vossa Terra - landscapes of Gonçalo Ribeiro Teles, by director João Mário Grilo, was presented.

== Commendations ==
On 31 October 1969, by president Américo Tomás, the rank of Officer of the Ancient, Most Noble and Enlightened Military Order of Saint James of the Sword, of the Scientific, Literary and Artistic Merit

On 6 April 1988, by president Mário Soares, the Grand Cross of the Military Order of Christ

On 10 June 1990, by president Mário Soares, the Grand Cross of the Order of Liberty

On 25 May 2017, by President Marcelo Rebelo de Sousa, the Grand Cross of the Order of Prince Henry
