= Gonçalo da Câmara Pereira =

Portuguese politician

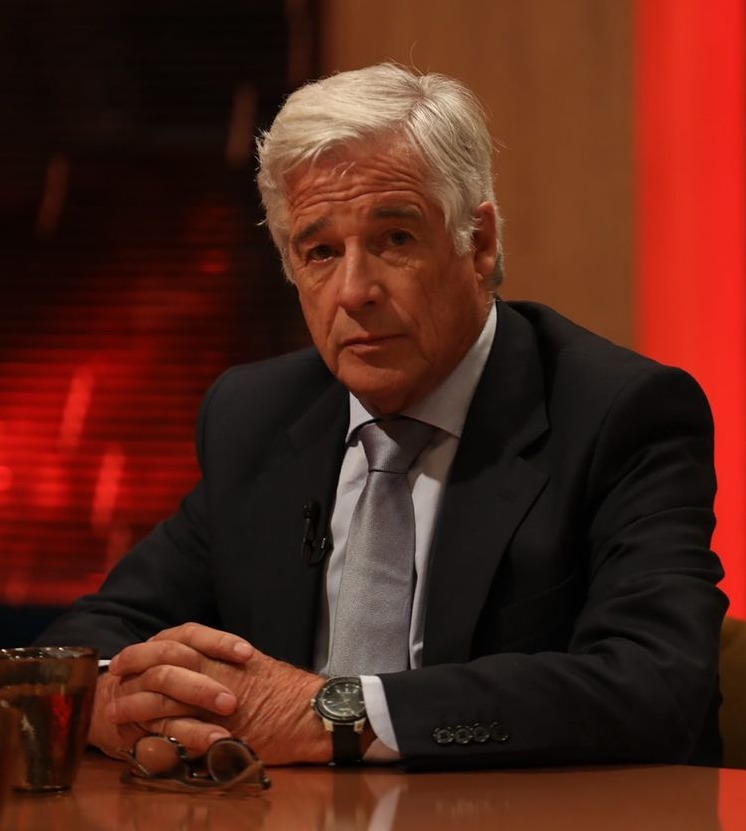
- Câmara Pereira in 2022

President of the People's Monarchist Party
- Incumbent
- Assumed office 25 August 2017
- Preceded by: Paulo Estêvão

Member of the Lisbon Municipal Assembly
- In office 18 October 2021 – 12 October 2025
- In office 11 October 2009 – 24 October 2013

Personal details
- Born: Gonçalo Maria Pacheco da Câmara Pereira; 15 May 1952 (age 74) Lisbon, Portugal
- Party: People's Monarchist Party (1974–present)
- Spouse: Maria do Carmo Amaral (m. 1974)
- Children: 3
- Education: University of Évora
- Occupation: Politician • Fado singer • Actor

Gonçalo Maria Pacheco da Câmara Pereira (born 15 May 1952) is a Portuguese politician, fado singer and actor. In 2020 he announced his candidacy for presidency of Portugal in the 2021 presidential elections, which he withdrew from. He has chaired the People's Monarchist Party (PPM) since 2017.

He was a member of the Lisbon Municipal Assembly between 2009 and 2013, nominated by the PPM as part of the "Lisboa com Sentido" coalition (PPD/PSD. CDS-PP. MPT. PPM). Since 2021, he has once again been a member of the Lisbon Municipal Assembly for the 2021 – 2025 term, having been nominated by the PPM as part of the "Novos Tempos Lisboa" coalition (PPD/PSD. CDS-PP. A. MPT. PPM).

He is a direct descendant of John VI, King of Portugal, and Pedro Álvares Cabral.
