= 2001 Portuguese local elections =

- 16 December 2001

All 308 Portuguese municipalities and 4,260 Portuguese Parishes All 2,044 local government councils
- Opinion polls
- Turnout: 60.1% ▲0.0 pp
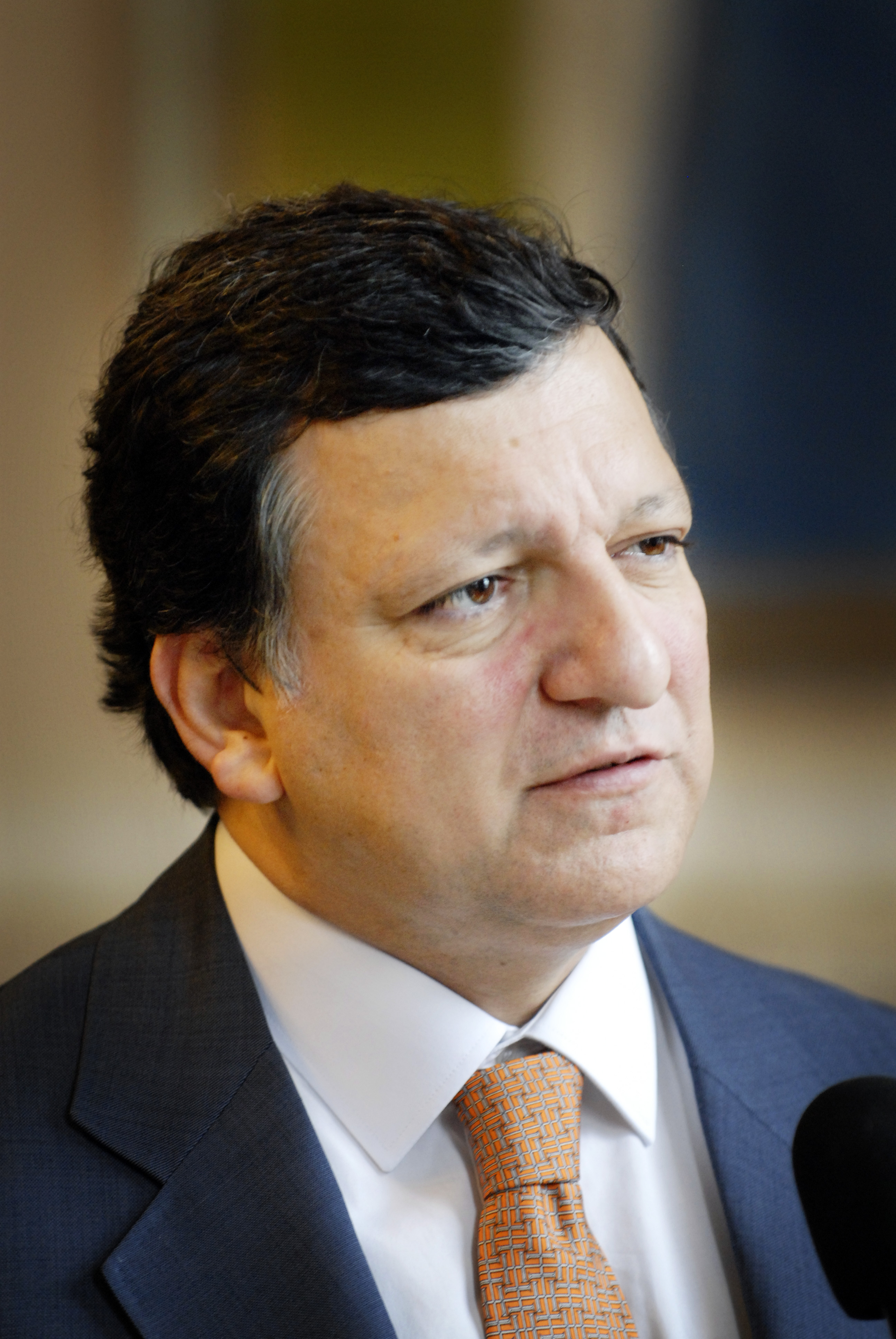

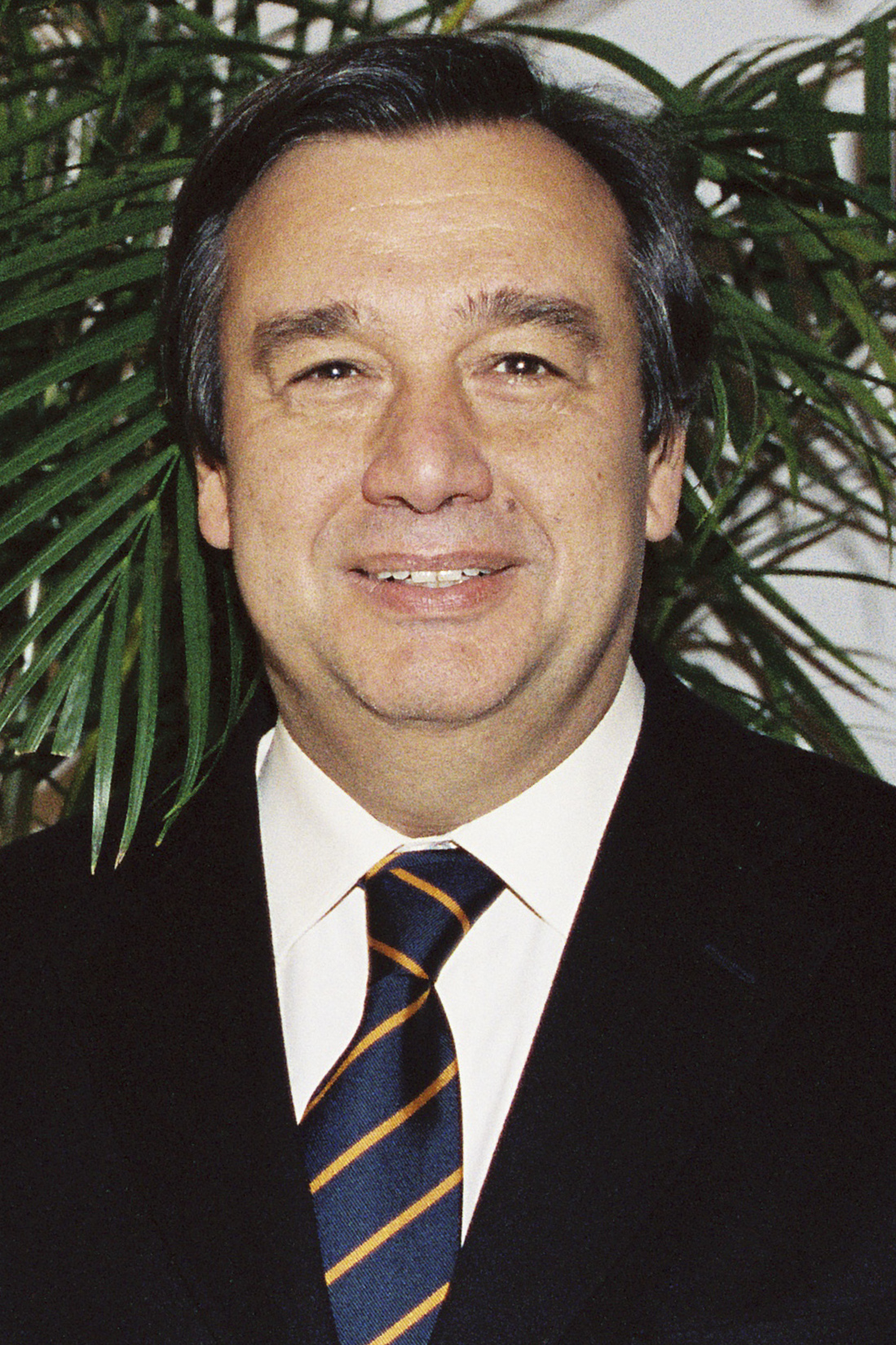

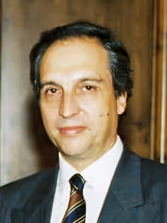
	First party	Second party	Third party
Leader	José Manuel Barroso	António Guterres	Carlos Carvalhas
Party	PSD	PS	PCP
Alliance			CDU
Last election	127 mayors, 35.8%	128 mayors, 41.3%	41 mayors, 12.0%
Popular vote	2,159,707	1,948,520	557,481
Percentage	41.1%	37.1%	10.6%
Swing	▲5.9 pp	▼4.1 pp	▼1.4 pp
Mayors	159	113	28
Mayors +/–	▲32	▼15	▼13
Councillors	906	850	199
Councillors +/–	▲94	▼29	▼37

Local elections were held in Portugal on 16 December 2001. The elections consisted of three separate elections in the 308 Portuguese municipalities, the election for the Municipal Chambers, another election for the Municipal Assembly and a last one for the lower-level Parish Assembly, whose winner is elected parish president. This last was held separately in the more than 4,200 parishes around the country.

The Social Democratic Party (PSD) won the elections by a landslide, defying polls in many cities across the country, in particular the three main cities, Lisbon, Porto and Sintra. The Social Democrats' victory was the first since 1985, with the party, and its coalitions, managing to elect 159 mayors. The PSD won 11 of the 20 district capitals mainly Lisbon, won by Pedro Santana Lopes, and Porto, won by Rui Rio in a major upset, plus many suburban cities like Sintra, Cascais, Vila Nova de Famalicão and Penafiel also swung to the Social Democrats.

The Socialist Party (PS) was the biggest loser of the elections. After 6 years in power, governing without an absolute majority and with a worsening economic situation, the PS hopes of maintaining the largest number of mayors were dashed. The defeat was worse than expected because of loses in the major cities of Lisbon and Porto, where polls showed the PS with a lead. Because of the party's bad results and the prospect of political instability, Prime Minister António Guterres resigned on election night, stating that the country should not fall in "a political swamp".

The election was also very bad for Democratic Unity Coalition (CDU), continuing their decline and achieving their worst result in a local election till that date. The Communist-Green alliance lost 13 mayoral races, plus 37 councillors, and lost big cities like Évora and Loures to the PS. The People's Party also had a poor showing losing 5 cities, although this time they celebrated several coalitions with the PSD. On the other hand, the election returns were quite good for other smaller parties: the Left Bloc (BE) won 1 city (Salvaterra de Magos) from CDU, and the Earth Party won Celorico da Beira from the PS. Independent movements were also allowed to run in these elections for the first time and won 3 cities.

Turnout in these elections remained unchanged in comparison with the 1997 election, as 60.1 percent of the electorate cast a ballot.

After these elections, a snap general election was called for March 2002.

== Background ==
=== Electoral system ===
All 308 municipalities are allocated a certain number of councilors to elect corresponding to the number of registered voters in a given municipality. Each party or coalition must present a list of candidates. The winner of the most voted list for the municipal council is automatically elected mayor, similar to first-past-the-post (FPTP). The lists are closed and the seats in each municipality are apportioned according to the D'Hondt method. Unlike in national legislative elections, independent lists are allowed to run.

=== By-elections (1997–2001) ===
During the normal four-year term of local governments, one municipal council by-election was held in the municipality of São Pedro do Sul on 26 November 2000, adding to this, fourteen parishes also held a by-election for parish assemblies.

City control in by-elections (1997–2001)
Date	Municipality	Population	Previous control	New control
26 November 2000	São Pedro do Sul	19,985	Socialist Party (PS)	Social Democratic Party (PSD)

== Parties ==
Official logo of the election.

The main political forces involved in the election were:

- Left Bloc (BE)
- CDS – People's Party (CDS–PP) (only in some municipalities)^{1}, ^{2}
- Unitary Democratic Coalition (CDU)^{2}
- Socialist Party (PS)^{2}
- Social Democratic Party (PSD) (only in some municipalities)^{1}

^{1} The PSD and the CDS–PP formed coalitions in several municipalities. In some municipalities the PSD or CDS–PP also formed coalitions with PPM.
^{2} The PS formed also some coalitions with the CDS–PP and a coalition with CDU in Lisbon.

== Results ==
=== Municipal Councils ===
==== National summary of votes and seats ====
Summary of the 16 December 2001 Municipal Councils elections results
Parties	Votes	%	±pp swing	Candidacies	Councillors		Mayors	
Parties	Votes	%	±pp swing	Candidacies	Total	±	Total	±
Socialist	1,792,690	34.12	▼4.0	295	829	▼40	113	▼14
Social Democratic	1,488,897	28.34	▼4.5	263	774	▼29	142	▲15
Democratic Unity Coalition	557,481	10.61	▼1.4	300	199	▼37	28	▼13
Social Democratic / People's	472,581	8.99	▲6.7	38	114	▲103	15	▲15
People's	195,994	3.73	▼1.9	195	39	▼44	3	▼5
Social Democratic / PPM	131,135	2.50	—	1	8	—	1	—
Socialist / Democratic Unity Coalition	130,279	2.48	▼0.6	1	8	▼2	0	▼1
Independents	84,010	1.60	—	22	31	—	3	—
PSD / CDS–PP / PPM	67,094	1.28	—	2	10	—	1	—
Left Bloc	61,789	1.18	—	70	6	—	1	—
Socialist / People's	25,551	0.49	—	7	13	—	0	—
Portuguese Workers' Communist	17,541	0.33	▼0.0	22	0	0	0	0
Earth	12,568	0.24	▲0.2	19	4	▲2	1	▲1
People's / Social Democratic	7,880	0.15	—	3	6	—	0	—
People's Democratic Union	5,318	0.10	▼0.3	11	0	0	0	0
People's / People's Monarchist	4,289	0.08	—	3	1	—	0	—
Humanist	3,019	0.06	—	7	0	—	0	—
People's / Socialist	2,010	0.04	—	1	2	—	0	—
National Renovator	877	0.02	—	2	0	—	0	—
People's Monarchist	294	0.01	▼0.1	1	0	▼5	0	▼1
**Total valid**	**5,061,297**	**96.33**	**▲0.2**	—	**2,044**	**▲21**	**308**	**▲3**
Blank ballots	114,834	2.19	0.0					
Invalid ballots	78,049	1.49	▼0.1					
**Total**	**5,254,180**	**100.00**						
Registered voters/turnout	8,738,906	60.12	▲0.0					

==== Municipality map ====
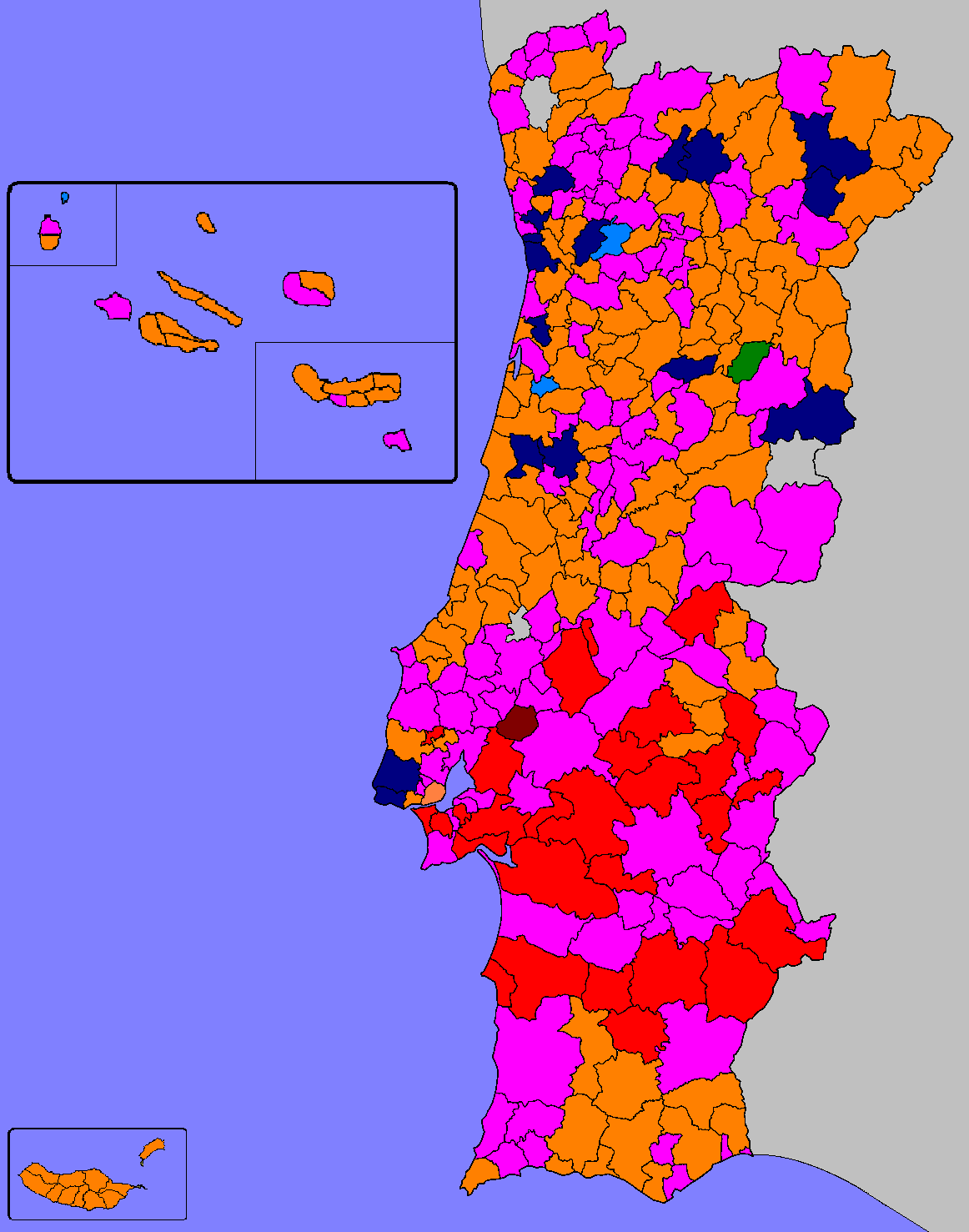
Most voted parties or coalitions in each Municipality. Municipalities won by: ■ - PSD: 142 ■ - PS: 113 ■ - CDU: 28 ■ - BE: 1 ■ - CDS–PP: 3 ■ - PSD coalitions: 17 ■ - MPT: 1 ■ - Independents: 3

==== City control ====
The following table lists party control in all district capitals, highlighted in bold, as well as in municipalities above 100,000 inhabitants. Population estimates from the 2001 Census.

Municipality	Population	Previous control	New control
Almada	160,825	Unitary Democratic Coalition (CDU)	Unitary Democratic Coalition (CDU)
Amadora	175,872	Socialist Party (PS)	Socialist Party (PS)
**Aveiro**	73,335	Socialist Party (PS)	Socialist Party (PS)
Barcelos	122,096	Social Democratic Party (PSD)	Social Democratic Party (PSD)
**Beja**	35,762	Unitary Democratic Coalition (CDU)	Unitary Democratic Coalition (CDU)
**Braga**	169,192	Socialist Party (PS)	Socialist Party (PS)
**Bragança**	34,750	Social Democratic Party (PSD)	Social Democratic Party (PSD)
Cascais	170,683	Socialist Party (PS)	PSD / CDS–PP
**Castelo Branco**	55,708	Socialist Party (PS)	Socialist Party (PS)
**Coimbra**	148,443	Socialist Party (PS)	PSD / CDS–PP / PPM
**Évora**	56,519	Unitary Democratic Coalition (CDU)	Socialist Party (PS)
**Faro**	58,051	Socialist Party (PS)	Social Democratic Party (PSD)
**Funchal**	103,961	Social Democratic Party (PSD)	Social Democratic Party (PSD)
Gondomar	159,096	Social Democratic Party (PSD)	Social Democratic Party (PSD)
**Guarda**	43,822	Socialist Party (PS)	Socialist Party (PS)
Guimarães	159,576	Socialist Party (PS)	Socialist Party (PS)
**Leiria**	119,847	Social Democratic Party (PSD)	Social Democratic Party (PSD)
**Lisbon** (details)	564,657	PS / CDU	PSD / PPM
Loures	199,059	Socialist Party (PS)	Socialist Party (PS)
Maia	120,111	Social Democratic Party (PSD)	PSD / CDS–PP
Matosinhos	167,026	Socialist Party (PS)	Socialist Party (PS)
Odivelas	133,847	Municipality created	Socialist Party (PS)
Oeiras	162,128	Social Democratic Party (PSD)	Social Democratic Party (PSD)
**Ponta Delgada**	65,854	Social Democratic Party (PSD)	Social Democratic Party (PSD)
**Portalegre**	25,980	Socialist Party (PS)	Social Democratic Party (PSD)
**Porto** (details)	263,131	Socialist Party (PS)	PSD / CDS–PP
**Santarém**	63,563	Socialist Party (PS)	Socialist Party (PS)
Santa Maria da Feira	135,964	Social Democratic Party (PSD)	Social Democratic Party (PSD)
Seixal	150,271	Unitary Democratic Coalition (CDU)	Unitary Democratic Coalition (CDU)
**Setúbal**	113,934	Socialist Party (PS)	Unitary Democratic Coalition (CDU)
Sintra	363,749	Socialist Party (PS)	PSD / CDS–PP
**Viana do Castelo**	88,631	Socialist Party (PS)	Socialist Party (PS)
Vila Franca de Xira	122,908	Socialist Party (PS)	Socialist Party (PS)
Vila Nova de Famalicão	127,567	Socialist Party (PS)	PSD / CDS–PP
Vila Nova de Gaia	288,749	Social Democratic Party (PSD)	PSD / CDS–PP
**Vila Real**	49,957	Social Democratic Party (PSD)	Social Democratic Party (PSD)
**Viseu**	93,501	Social Democratic Party (PSD)	Social Democratic Party (PSD)

=== Municipal Assemblies ===
==== National summary of votes and seats ====
Summary of the 16 December 2001 Municipal Assemblies elections results
Parties	Votes	%	±pp swing	Candidacies	Mandates	
Parties	Votes	%	±pp swing	Candidacies	Total	±
Socialist	1,788,089	34.03	▼3.8		2,721	▼166
Social Democratic	1,430,532	27.23	▼3.2		2,468	▼111
Democratic Unity Coalition	585,426	11.14	▼1.3		709	▼89
Social Democratic / People's	486,936	9.27	▲7.0		427	▲392
People's	226,774	4.32	▼3.1		253	▼184
Socialist / Democratic Unity Coalition	129,852	2.47	▼0.6		24	▼6
Social Democratic / PPM	124,457	2.37	—		23	—
Left Bloc	80,520	1.53	—		28	—
PSD / CDS–PP / PPM	64,430	1.23	—		40	—
Independents	60,919	1.16	—		93	—
Socialist / People's	26,174	0.50	—		40	—
Earth	12,694	0.24	▲0.2		18	▲13
Portuguese Workers' Communist	7,863	0.15	▼0.1		1	0
People's / Social Democratic	6,943	0.13	—		19	—
People's Democratic Union	5,800	0.11	▼0.4		2	0
People's / People's Monarchist	4,425	0.08	—		3	—
People's / Socialist	2,302	0.04	—		7	—
National Renovator	779	0.01	—		0	—
People's Monarchist	436	0.01	▼0.1		0	▼16
Humanist	155	0.00	—		0	—
**Total valid**	**5,045,506**	**96.02**	**▲0.2**	—	**6,876**	**▲69**
Blank ballots	130,359	2.48	▼0.1			
Invalid ballots	78,578	1.50	▼0.1			
**Total**	**5,254,443**	**100.00**				
Registered voters/turnout	8,738,906	60.13	▲0.0			

=== Parish Assemblies ===
==== National summary of votes and seats ====
Summary of the 16 December 2001 Parish Assemblies elections results
Parties	Votes	%	±pp swing	Candidacies	Mandates		Presidents	
Parties	Votes	%	±pp swing	Candidacies	Total	±	Total	±
Socialist	1,775,531	33.85	▼2.7	3,578	13,195	▼435	1,523	▼169
Social Democratic	1,392,019	26.54	▼3.7	3,073	12,148	▼812	1,649	▲52
Democratic Unity Coalition	586,844	11.19	▼1.2	2,139	2,466	▼265	232	▼48
Social Democratic / People's	431,002	8.22	▲4.3	544	2,124	▲1,486	215	▲183
Independents	232,861	4.44	▲1.7	696	2,407	▲813	311	▲115
People's	189,838	3.62	▼1.8	1,090	970	▼870	79	▼87
Socialist / Democratic Unity Coalition	132,918	2.53	▼0.7	53	309	▼99	35	▼5
Social Democratic / PPM	121,259	2.31	—	53	265	—	18	—
PSD / CDS–PP / PPM	60,295	1.15	—	82	302	—	32	—
Left Bloc	57,361	1.09	—	286	46	—	6	—
Socialist / People's	25,583	0.49	—	35	112	—	2	—
Earth	8,626	0.16	▲0.1	56	120	▲81	18	▲16
People's / Social Democratic	6,966	0.13	—	18	67	—	8	—
People's Democratic Union	5,299	0.10	▼0.2	49	7	▲1	0	0
Portuguese Workers' Communist	4,961	0.09	0.0	27	1	▼1	0	0
People's / People's Monarchist	4,714	0.09	—	36	4	—	0	—
People's / Socialist	2,326	0.04	—	8	25	—	1	—
Humanist	220	0.00	—	2	0	—	0	—
People's Monarchist	98	0.00	▼0.1	1	1	▼79	0	▼10
**Total valid**	**5,038,721**	**96.05**	**▲0.1**	—	**34,569**	**▲616**	**4,129**	**▲108**
Blank ballots	120,665	2.30	▲0.1					
Invalid ballots	86,409	1.65	▼0.2					
**Total** (turnout 60.03%)	**5,245,795**	**100.00**	**▲0.2**					
Registered voters/turnout	8,738,906	60.03	▲0.3					

== See also ==
- Politics of Portugal
- List of political parties in Portugal
- Elections in Portugal
