= 1985 Portuguese local elections =

- 15 December 1985

All 305 Portuguese municipalities and 4,260 Portuguese Parishes All 1,981 local government councils
- Turnout: 63.9% ▼7.5 pp
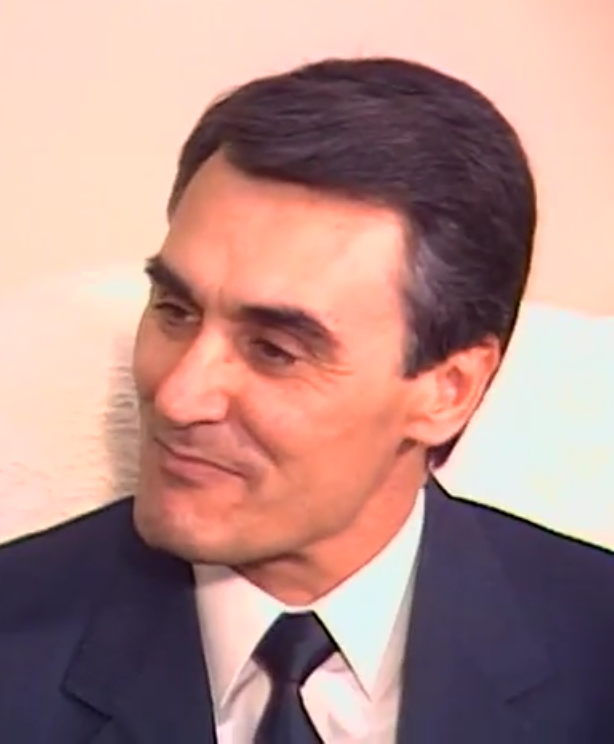

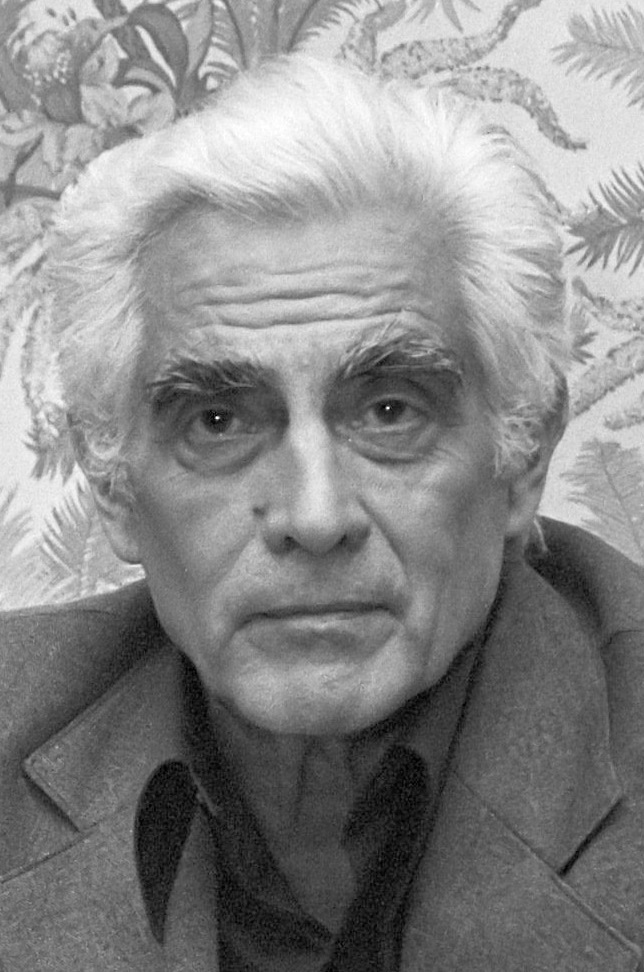

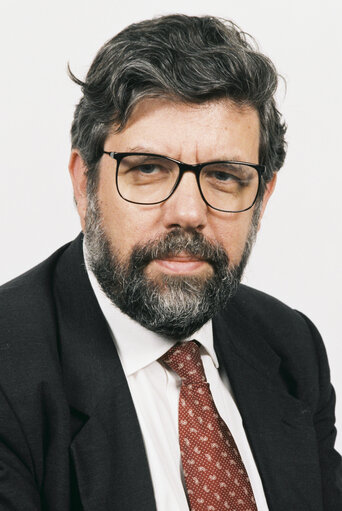
	First party	Second party
		PS
Leader	Aníbal Cavaco Silva	António Macedo (interim)
Party	PSD	PS
Last election	88 mayors, 14.6%	83 mayors, 31.1%
Popular vote	1,649,560	1,330,388
Percentage	34.0%	27.4%
Swing	▲19.4 pp	▼3.7 pp
Mayors	149	79
Mayors +/–	▲61	▼4
Councillors	822	571
Councillors +/–	▲380	▼57
	Third party	Fourth party
Leader	Álvaro Cunhal	Lucas Pires
Party	PCP	CDS
Alliance	APU
Last election	55 mayors, 20.7%	27 mayors, 7.5%
Popular vote	942,197	471,838
Percentage	19.4%	9.7%
Swing	▼1.3 pp	▲2.2 pp
Mayors	47	27
Mayors +/–	▼8	0
Councillors	305	224
Councillors +/–	▼20	▲33

Local elections were held in Portugal on 15 December 1985. They were the fourth local elections in Portugal since the 1976 Constitution introduced the concept of democratic local power. The elections took place just nine weeks after the 1985 legislative election and just one month before the 1986 Presidential elections.

The elections consisted of three separate elections in the 305 Portuguese municipalities that existed at the time, the election for the Municipal Chambers, another election for the Municipal Assembly and a last one for the lower-level Parish Assembly, whose winner is elected parish president, this last was held separately in the more than 4,000 parishes around the country. This election was the first to grant a 4-year term, instead of the previous 3-year terms. The number of members of the Municipal Assemblies and Parish Assemblies was greatly reduced in comparison with the former election.

For the first time, the Social Democratic Party polled first by itself, since the coalition with the Democratic and Social Center, the Democratic Alliance, that achieved good results in 1979 and 1982, had been disbanded. Despite finishing second and losing almost 4 points in share, the Socialist Party lost only 4 mayors, which included a coalition with the Leftwing Union for the Socialist Democracy.

The Democratic and Social Center, this time participating alone in every municipality, after the end of the Democratic Alliance, continued its electoral decline, gathering only 10 percent of the votes. Despite holding on to the same number of mayors achieved, by itself, in 1982, the party still lost 49 presidencies achieved in coalition with the Social Democrats.

The Portuguese Communist Party and the Portuguese Democratic Movement, united in the United People Alliance, lost one percentage point in comparison with the 1982 election and lost 8 mayors, falling to 47 presidencies. However, despite only a small drop in vote share, in the elections to Municipal Assemblies, the coalition lost almost 700 assembly members, decreasing its representation to 1,062 members due to the overall reduction of mandates.

The newly founded Democratic Renewal Party, achieved almost 5 percent of the voting and the presidency of 3 municipalities. In the elections to Municipal Assemblies it gathered almost 6% of the voting and 270 Assembly members, albeit the shares were far inferior to those achieved in the legislative election of October of the same year.

Turnout in these elections fell more than eight points compared with 1982, with 63 percent of voters casting a ballot.

== Background ==
=== Electoral system ===
All 305 municipalities are allocated a certain number of councilors to elect corresponding to the number of registered voters in a given municipality. Each party or coalition must present a list of candidates. The winner of the most voted list for the municipal council is automatically elected mayor, similar to first-past-the-post (FPTP). The lists are closed and the seats in each municipality are apportioned according to the D'Hondt method.

=== By-elections (1982–1985) ===
During the normal three-year term of local governments, four municipal council by-elections were held: In the municipality of Guimarães on 4 September 1983; In the municipality of Marco de Canaveses on 18 December 1983; In the municipality of São João da Madeira on 15 April 1984; In the municipality of Lamego on 29 April 1984, adding to this, sixty-four parishes also held a by-election for parish assemblies.

City control in by-elections (1982–1985)
Date	Municipality	Population	Previous control	New control
4 September 1983	Guimarães	146,959	Socialist Party (PS)	Socialist Party (PS)
18 December 1983	Marco de Canaveses	46,131	Democratic and Social Center (CDS)	Democratic and Social Center (CDS)
15 April 1984	São João da Madeira	16,444	Democratic Alliance (AD)	Democratic and Social Center (CDS)
29 April 1984	Lamego	32,833	Social Democratic Party (PSD)	Social Democratic Party (PSD)

== Parties ==
The main political forces involved in the election were:

- United People Alliance (APU)
- Democratic and Social Center (CDS)
- Democratic Renewal Party (PRD)
- Socialist Party (PS)
- Social Democratic Party (PSD)

== Results ==
=== Municipal Councils ===
==== National summary of votes and seats ====
Summary of the 15 December 1985 Municipal Councils elections results
Parties	Votes	%	±pp swing	Candidacies	Councillors		Mayors	
Parties	Votes	%	±pp swing	Candidacies	Total	±	Total	±
Social Democratic	1,649,560	33.99	▲19.4	268	822	▲380	149	▲61
Socialist	1,330,388	27.41	▼3.7	285	571	▼57	79	▼4
United People Alliance	942,197	19.41	▼1.3	305	305	▼20	47	▼8
Democratic and Social Centre	471,838	9.72	▲2.2	163	224	▲33	27	0
Democratic Renewal	230,177	4.74	—	115	51	—	3	—
Popular Democratic Union	28,701	0.59	▼0.0	63	3	0	0	0
People's Monarchist	23,897	0.49	▲0.3	6	3	▼2	0	▼1
Portuguese Workers' Communist	11,275	0.23	▼0.1	32	0	0	0	0
Christian Democratic	7,863	0.16	▲0.1	5	2	0	0	0
Workers Party of Socialist Unity	2,311	0.05	▼0.0	3	0	0	0	0
**Total valid**	**4,698,207**	**96.80**	**▲0.5**	—	**1,981**	**▲32**	**305**	**0**
Blank ballots	76,607	1.58	▼0.2					
Invalid ballots	78,715	1.62	▼0.3					
**Total**	**4,853,529**	**100.00**						
Registered voters/turnout	7,595,146	63.90	▼7.5					

==== Municipality map ====
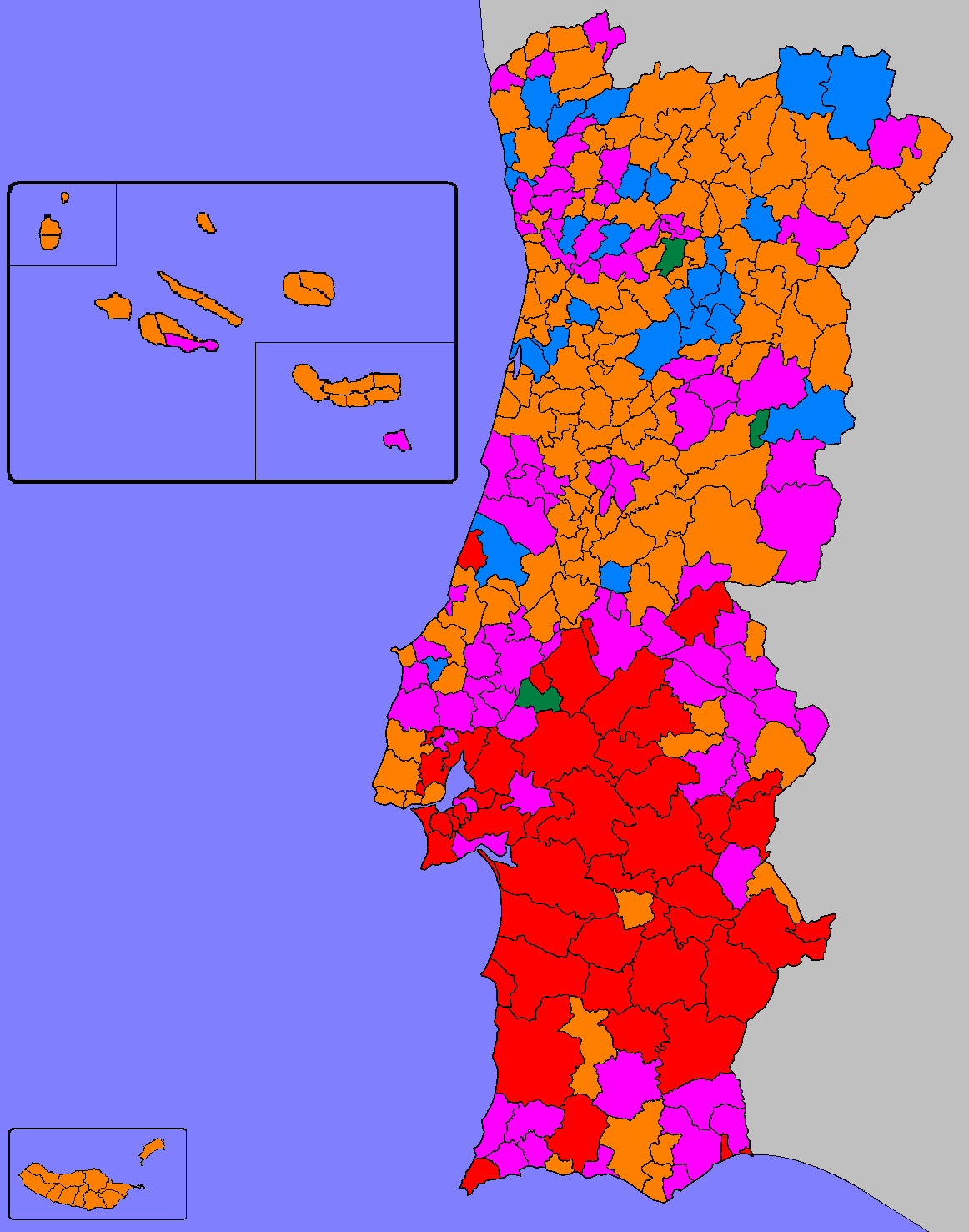
Most voted parties or coalitions in each Municipality. Municipalities won by: ■ - PSD: 149 ■ - PS: 79 ■ - APU: 47 ■ - CDS: 27 ■ - PRD: 3

==== City control ====
The following table lists party control in all district capitals, highlighted in bold, as well as in municipalities above 100,000 inhabitants. Population estimates from the 1981 Census.

Municipality	Population	Previous control	New control
Almada	147,690	United People Alliance (APU)	United People Alliance (APU)
Amadora	163,878	United People Alliance (APU)	United People Alliance (APU)
**Aveiro**	60,284	Democratic and Social Centre (CDS)	Democratic and Social Centre (CDS)
Barcelos	103,773	Social Democratic Party (PSD)	Social Democratic Party (PSD)
**Beja**	38,246	United People Alliance (APU)	United People Alliance (APU)
**Braga**	125,472	Socialist Party (PS)	Socialist Party (PS)
**Bragança**	35,380	Democratic and Social Centre (CDS)	Democratic and Social Centre (CDS)
Cascais	141,498	Social Democratic Party (PSD)	Social Democratic Party (PSD)
**Castelo Branco**	54,908	Democratic Alliance (AD)	Social Democratic Party (PSD)
**Coimbra**	138,930	Socialist Party (PS)	Social Democratic Party (PSD)
**Évora**	51,572	United People Alliance (APU)	United People Alliance (APU)
**Faro**	45,109	Democratic Alliance (AD)	Social Democratic Party (PSD)
**Funchal**	112,746	Social Democratic Party (PSD)	Social Democratic Party (PSD)
Gondomar	130,751	Socialist Party (PS)	Socialist Party (PS)
**Guarda**	40,360	Socialist Party (PS)	Socialist Party (PS)
Guimarães	146,959	Socialist Party (PS)	Social Democratic Party (PSD)
**Leiria**	96,517	Democratic and Social Centre (CDS)	Democratic and Social Centre (CDS)
**Lisbon**	807,937	Democratic Alliance (AD)	Social Democratic Party (PSD)
Loures	276,467	United People Alliance (APU)	United People Alliance (APU)
Matosinhos	136,498	Socialist Party (PS)	Socialist Party (PS)
Oeiras	149,328	Democratic Alliance (AD)	Social Democratic Party (PSD)
**Ponta Delgada**	63,804	Social Democratic Party (PSD)	Social Democratic Party (PSD)
**Portalegre**	27,313	Socialist Party (PS)	Socialist Party (PS)
**Porto**	327,368	Democratic Alliance (AD)	Social Democratic Party (PSD)
**Santarém**	62,896	Socialist Party (PS)	Socialist Party (PS)
Santa Maria da Feira	109,531	Democratic Alliance (AD)	Social Democratic Party (PSD)
**Setúbal**	98,366	United People Alliance (APU)	Socialist Party (PS)
Sintra	226,428	Democratic Alliance (AD)	Social Democratic Party (PSD)
**Viana do Castelo**	81,009	Democratic Alliance (AD)	Social Democratic Party (PSD)
Vila Nova de Famalicão	106,508	Socialist Party (PS)	Socialist Party (PS)
Vila Nova de Gaia	226,331	Socialist Party (PS)	Social Democratic Party (PSD)
**Vila Real**	47,020	Democratic Alliance (AD)	Social Democratic Party (PSD)
**Viseu**	83,261	Social Democratic Party (PSD)	Democratic and Social Centre (CDS)

=== Municipal Assemblies ===
==== National summary of votes and seats ====
Summary of the 15 December 1985 Municipal Assemblies elections results
Parties	Votes	%	±pp swing	Candidacies	Mandates	
Parties	Votes	%	±pp swing	Candidacies	Total	±
Social Democratic	1,438,790	29.64	▲15.5		2,539	▲380
Socialist	1,170,840	24.12	▼6.9		1,817	▼1,386
United People Alliance	968,148	19.95	▼1.0		1,062	▼719
Democratic and Social Centre	782,209	16.12	▲8.4		1,019	▲5
Democratic Renewal	260,960	5.38	—		270	—
Popular Democratic Union	33,447	0.69	▼0.0		14	▼6
People's Monarchist	15,927	0.33	▲0.1		7	▼21
Portuguese Workers' Communist	6,494	0.13	▼0.0		0	▼1
Christian Democratic	4,026	0.08	▲0.1		2	0
Socialist League of the Workers	784	0.02	—		0	—
Workers Party of Socialist Unity	250	0.00	▼0.0		0	0
**Total valid**	**4,681,875**	**96.46**	**▲0.7**	—	**6,730**	**▼3,271**
Blank ballots	94,075	1.94	▼0.3			
Invalid ballots	77,573	1.60	▼0.4			
**Total**	**4,853,523**	**100.00**				
Registered voters/turnout	7,595,146	63.90	▼7.5			

=== Parish Assemblies ===
==== National summary of votes and seats ====
Summary of the 15 December 1985 Parish Assemblies elections results
Parties	Votes	%	±pp swing	Candidacies	Mandates		Presidents	
Parties	Votes	%	±pp swing	Candidacies	Total	±	Total	±
Social Democratic	1,584,664	32.84	▲17.6		13,117	▲3,532	1,841	▲799
Socialist	1,303,759	27.02	▼3.4		9,044	▼3,804	1,001	▼24
United People Alliance	993,813	20.60	▼0.7		3,675	▼1,424	355	▲21
Democratic and Social Centre	507,715	10.52	▲2.7		4,532	▼412	518	▲105
Democratic Renewal	164,410	3.41	—		726	—	40	—
Independents	67,628	1.40	▲0.1		793	▼206	107	▼6
Popular Democratic Union	28,572	0.59	▲0.1		26	▼5	1	0
Portuguese Workers' Communist	4,153	0.09	▼0.0		0	0	0	0
People's Monarchist	2,585	0.05	▼0.1		24	▼79	2	▼7
Christian Democratic	1,021	0.02	▲0.0		4	▲4	0	0
Workers Party of Socialist Unity	792	0.02	0.0		0	0	0	0
**Total valid**	**4,659,112**	**96.57**	**▲0.5**	—	**31,941**	**▼10,202**	**3,865**	**▲120**
Blank ballots	84,823	1.76	▲0.0					
Invalid ballots	80,780	1.67	▼0.4					
**Total**	**4,824,715**	**100.00**						
Registered voters/turnout	7,554,276	63.87	▼7.5					

=== Maps ===
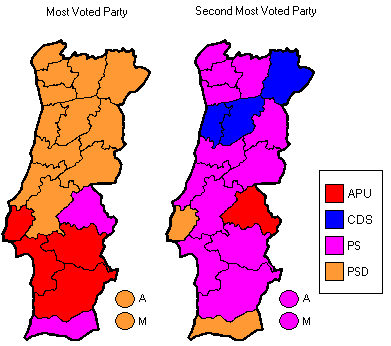
The first and the second most voted parties in Municipal Councils in each district.

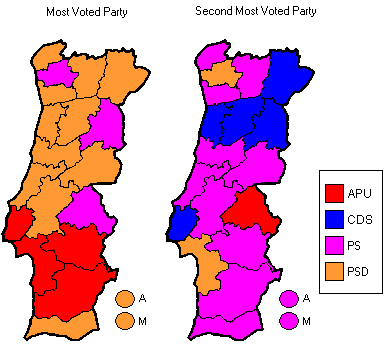
The first and the second most voted parties in Municipal Assemblies in each district.

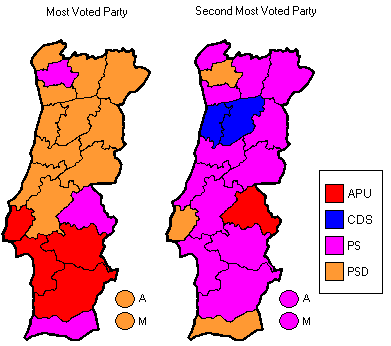
The first and the second most voted parties in Parish Assemblies in each district.

== Notes ==
- The source of the voting data is the Portuguese Electoral Commission

Further Notes:

- United People Alliance (APU) was composed by the Portuguese Communist Party (PCP) and the Portuguese Democratic Movement (MDP/CDE).
- The number of candidacies expresses the number of municipalities or parishes in which the party or coalition presented lists.
- The number of mandates expresses the number of municipal deputies in the Municipal Assembly election and the number of parish deputies in the Parish Assembly election.
- The turnout varies because one may choose not to vote for all the organs.

== See also ==
- Politics of Portugal
- List of political parties in Portugal
- Elections in Portugal
