= 6th Constitutional Government of Portugal =

Cabinet of Portugal between 1980 and 1981, led by Francisco Sá Carneiro

VI Constitutional Government of Portugal
- Cabinet of Portugal

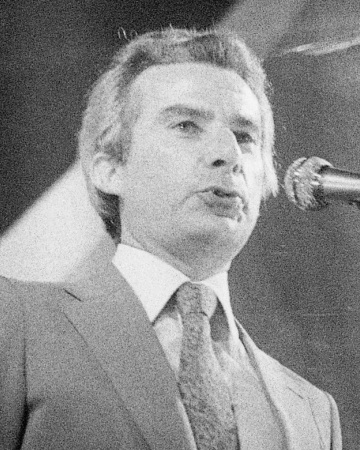
- Prime Minister Francisco Sá Carneiro
- Date formed: 3 January 1980
- Date dissolved: 9 January 1981

People and organisations
- President of the Republic: António Ramalho Eanes
- Prime Minister: Francisco Sá Carneiro
- Vice Prime Minister: Diogo Freitas do Amaral
- Member parties: Social Democratic Party (PSD); Democratic and Social Center (CDS); People's Monarchist Party (PPM)
- Status in legislature: Majority coalition government
- Opposition parties: Socialist Party (PS); Portuguese Communist Party (PCP); Popular Democratic Union (UDP)

History
- Elections: 1979 Portuguese legislative election (2 December 1979); 1980 Portuguese legislative election (5 October 1980)
- Predecessor: V Constitutional Government of Portugal
- Successor: VII Constitutional Government of Portugal

The VI Constitutional Government of Portugal (Portuguese: VI Governo Constitucional de Portugal) was the sixth government of the Third Portuguese Republic, in office from 3 January 1980 to 9 January 1981. It was formed by a centre-right coalition between the Social Democratic Party (PSD), the Democratic and Social Center (CDS) and the People's Monarchist Party (PPM), which ran together in the 1979 and 1980 legislative elections as the Democratic Alliance (AD). Francisco Sá Carneiro, leader of the PSD, was the Prime Minister, and Diogo Freitas do Amaral, leader of the CDS, was Vice Prime Minister.

On 4 December 1980, Sá Carneiro and the Minister of National Defense Adelino Amaro da Costa were killed in an air crash in Camarate, shortly after the plane carrying them took off from the Lisbon Airport. Following the disaster, Freitas do Amaral acted as interim Prime Minister until the dissolution of the government on 9 January 1981.

== Party breakdown ==
Party breakdown of cabinet ministers by the end of the government's time in office: (Prime Minister not included)

- Social Democratic Party
8
- Democratic Social Center
5
- Independents
3

== Composition ==
The government was composed of the Prime Minister, one Deputy Prime Minister, and 14 ministries comprising ministers, secretaries and sub-secretaries of state. The government also included the Ministers of the Republic for the Autonomous Regions of Azores and Madeira.

Ministers of the VI Constitutional Government of Portugal
Office	Minister	Party	Start of term	End of term
Prime Minister	Francisco Sá Carneiro	PSD	3 January 1980	4 December 1980
Prime Minister	Diogo Freitas do Amaral (interim)	CDS	4 December 1980	9 January 1981
Deputy Prime Minister (Vice-Primeiro-Ministro)	Diogo Freitas do Amaral	CDS	3 January 1980	4 December 1980
Assistant Minister to the Prime Minister (Ministro Adjunto do Primeiro Ministro)	Francisco Pinto Balsemão	PSD	3 January 1980	9 January 1981
Minister of Foreign Affairs	Diogo Freitas do Amaral	CDS	3 January 1980	9 January 1981
Minister of National Defence	Adelino Amaro da Costa	CDS	3 January 1980	4 December 1980
Minister of Internal Administration	Eurico de Melo	PSD	3 January 1980	9 January 1981
Minister of Justice	Mário Raposo	PSD	3 January 1980	9 January 1981
Minister of Finance and Planning	Aníbal Cavaco Silva	PSD	3 January 1980	9 January 1981
Minister of Education and Science	Vítor Crespo	PSD	3 January 1980	9 January 1981
Minister of Labour	Eusébio Marques de Carvalho	Independent	3 January 1980	9 January 1981
Minister of Social Affairs	João Morais Leitão	CDS	3 January 1980	9 January 1981
Minister of Agriculture and Fisheries	António Cardoso e Cunha	PSD	3 January 1980	9 January 1981
Minister of Commerce and Tourism	Basílio Horta	CDS	3 January 1980	9 January 1981
Minister of Industry and Energy	Álvaro Barreto	PSD	3 January 1980	9 January 1981
Minister of Housing and Public Works	João Porto	CDS	3 January 1980	9 January 1981
Minister of Transports and Communications	José Carlos Viana Baptista	PSD	3 January 1980	9 January 1981
Minister of the Republic for the Autonomous Region of Azores	Henrique Afonso da Silva Horta	Independent	3 January 1980	9 January 1981
Minister of the Republic for the Autonomous Region of Madeira	Lino Miguel	Independent	3 January 1980	9 January 1981
