= Paulo Estêvão =

Portuguese politician (born 1968)

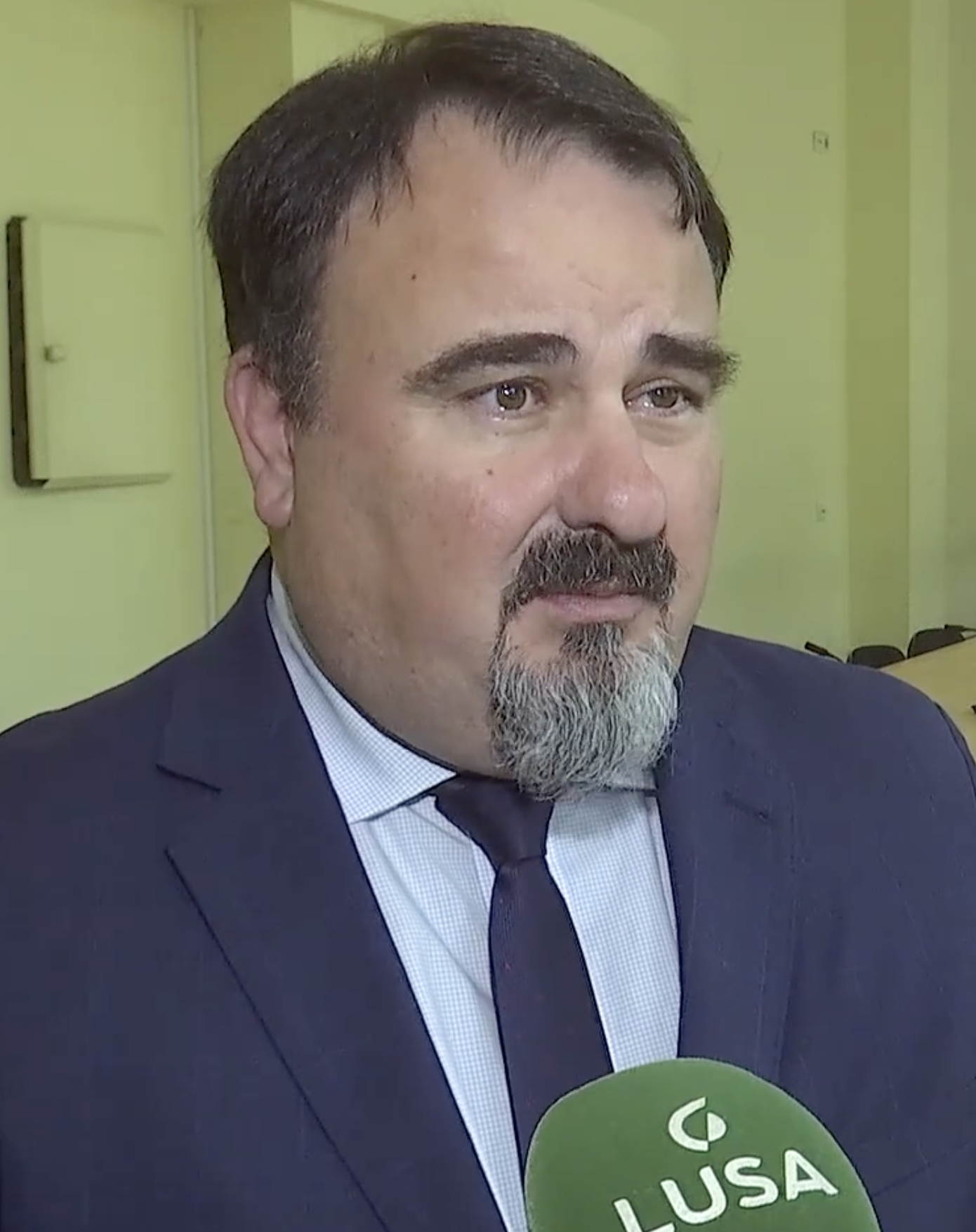
Paulo Estêvão in 2025

Paulo Jorge Abraços Estêvão (born 27 July 1968) is a Portuguese politician who is currently serving as the Secretary of Parliamentary Affairs and Communities of the Azores since 2024. He has also been a member of the Legislative Assembly of the Azores from 2008 and 2024 and the President of the People's Monarchist Party from April 2010 to August 2017.

== Biography ==
Estêvão was born in Serpa, Beja District on July 27, 1968.

He earned a degree in history with a specialization in teaching from the University of Évora.

Prior to his election he worked as a primary and secondary school teacher.

Estêvão was elected to the Azores Regional Council as a member of the CDS/PP serving as their Vice-President of their delegation to the Council from 1998 to 2000.

In 2005 he switched parties to the People's Monarchist Party (PPM), serving as their Vice-President in the Council.

In 2008 he was elected to the Legislative Assembly of the Autonomous Region of the Azores as a member of the PPM, serving until 2024.

During his time in office, namely due to him being the only PPM politician elected to a Legislative Assembly, he was chosen as the PPM's leader from 2010 until he stepped down in 2017.

After leaving the assembly in 2024 he has worked as the Regional Secretary for Parliamentary Affairs and Communities.
