= 7th Constitutional Government of Portugal =

Cabinet of Portugal in 1981, led by Francisco Pinto Balsemão

VII Constitutional Government of Portugal
- Cabinet of Portugal

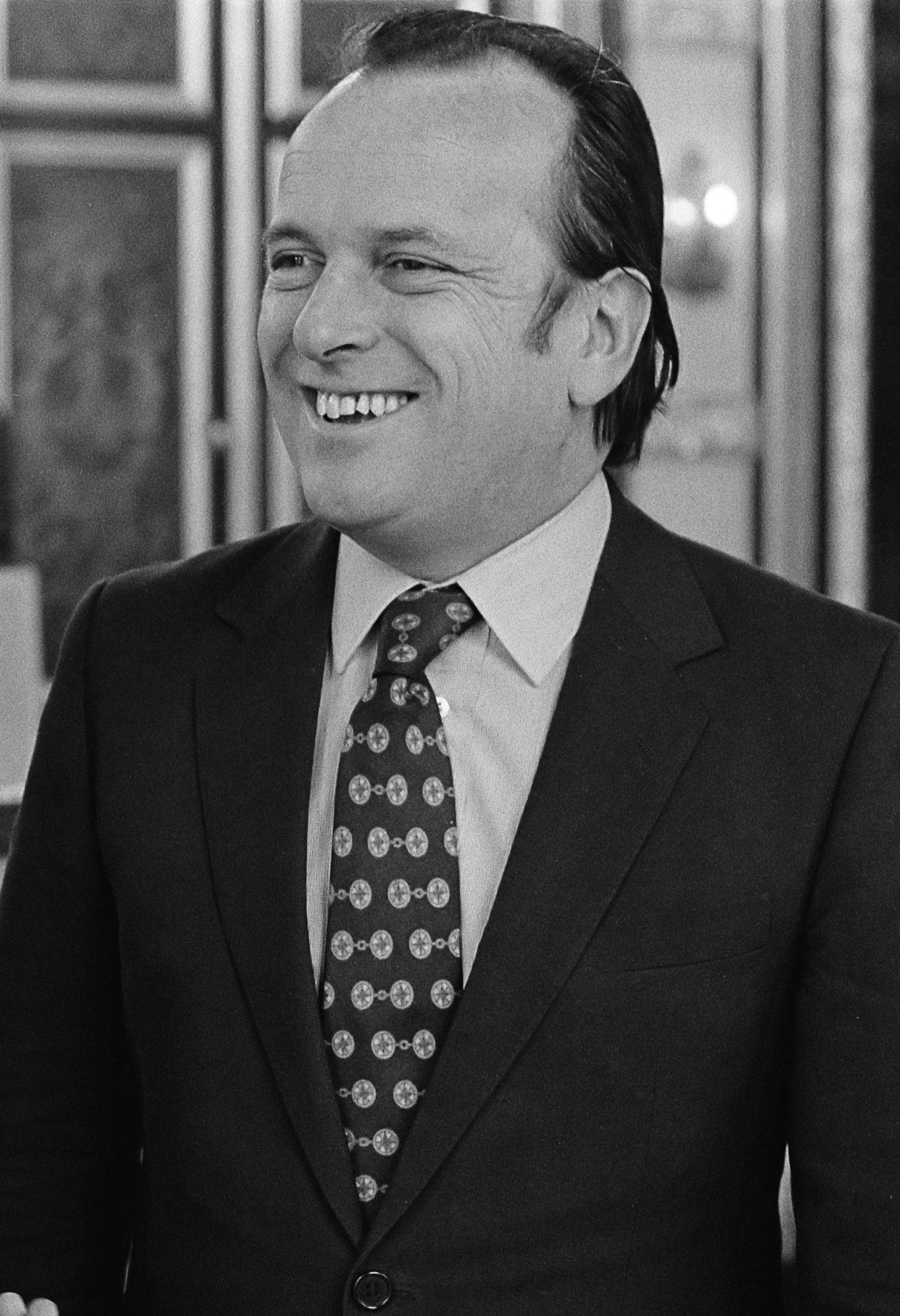
- Prime Minister Francisco Pinto Balsemão
- Date formed: 9 January 1981
- Date dissolved: 4 September 1981

People and organisations
- President of the Republic: António Ramalho Eanes
- Prime Minister: Francisco Pinto Balsemão
- Member parties: Social Democratic Party (PSD); Democratic and Social Center (CDS); People's Monarchist Party (PPM)
- Status in legislature: Majority coalition government
- Opposition parties: Socialist Party (PS); Portuguese Communist Party (PCP); Popular Democratic Union (UDP)

History
- Predecessor: VI Constitutional Government of Portugal
- Successor: VIII Constitutional Government of Portugal

The VII Constitutional Government of Portugal (Portuguese: VII Governo Constitucional de Portugal) was the seventh government of the Third Portuguese Republic, in office from 9 January 1981 to 4 September 1981. It was formed by a centre-right coalition between the Social Democratic Party (PSD), the Democratic and Social Center (CDS) and the People's Monarchist Party (PPM), which ran together in the 1980 legislative election as the Democratic Alliance (AD). Francisco Pinto Balsemão was the Prime Minister.

== Party breakdown ==
Party breakdown of cabinet ministers by the end of the government's time in office: (Prime Minister not included)

- Social Democratic Party
8
- Democratic Social Center
5
- People's Monarchist Party
1
- Independents
4

== Composition ==
The government was composed of the Prime Minister, one Assistant Minister to the Prime Minister, and 16 ministries comprising ministers, secretaries and sub-secretaries of state. The government also included the Ministers of the Republic for the Autonomous Regions of Azores and Madeira.

Ministers of the VII Constitutional Government of Portugal
Office	Minister	Party	Start of term	End of term
Prime Minister	Francisco Pinto Balsemão	PSD	9 January 1981	4 September 1981
Assistant Minister to the Prime Minister (Ministro Adjunto do Primeiro Ministro)	Basílio Horta	CDS	9 January 1981	4 September 1981
Minister of Internal Administration	Fernando do Amaral	PSD	9 January 1981	4 September 1981
Minister of National Defence	Luís de Azevedo Coutinho	CDS	9 January 1981	4 September 1981
Minister of Foreign Affairs	André Gonçalves Pereira	Independent	9 January 1981	4 September 1981
Minister of Justice	José Menéres Pimentel	PSD	9 January 1981	4 September 1981
Minister of Finance and Planning	João Morais Leitão	CDS	9 January 1981	4 September 1981
Minister of Education and Science	Vítor Pereira Crespo	PSD	9 January 1981	4 September 1981
Minister of Labour	Henrique Nascimento Rodrigues	PSD	9 January 1981	4 September 1981
Minister of Social Affairs	Carlos Chaves de Macedo	PSD	9 January 1981	3 August 1981
Minister of Social Affairs	Francisco Pinto Balsemão	PSD	3 August 1981	4 September 1981
Minister of Agriculture and Fisheries	António Cardoso e Cunha	PSD	9 January 1981	4 September 1981
Minister of Commerce and Tourism	Alexandre Vaz Pinto	PSD	9 January 1981	4 September 1981
Minister of Industry and Energy	Ricardo Bayão Horta	CDS	9 January 1981	4 September 1981
Minister of Housing and Public Works	Luís Barbosa	CDS	9 January 1981	4 September 1981
Minister of Transports and Communications	José Carlos Viana Baptista	PSD	9 January 1981	4 September 1981
Minister of Administrative Reform	Eusébio Marques de Carvalho	Independent	9 January 1981	4 June 1981
Minister of Quality of Life	Augusto Ferreira do Amaral	PPM	9 January 1981	4 June 1981
Minister of Quality of Life	João Vaz Serra de Moura	PPM	4 June 1981	4 September 1981
Minister of European Integration	Álvaro Barreto	PSD	9 January 1981	4 September 1981
Minister of the Republic for the Autonomous Region of Azores	Henrique Afonso da Silva Horta	Independent	9 January 1981	28 April 1981
Minister of the Republic for the Autonomous Region of Azores	Tomás George da Conceição Silva	Independent	28 April 1981	4 September 1981
Minister of the Republic for the Autonomous Region of Madeira	Lino Miguel	Independent	9 January 1981	4 September 1981
