= People's Monarchist Party (Portugal) =

Monarchist political party in Portugal

People's Monarchist Party Partido Popular Monárquico
- Abbreviation: PPM
- Leader: Gonçalo da Câmara Pereira
- Founder: Gonçalo Ribeiro Telles; Francisco Rolão Preto
- Founded: 23 May 1974
- Headquarters: Travessa Pimenteira, 1300-460, Lisbon
- Youth wing: Monarchical Youth (JM; dissolved in 2024)
- Ideology: Constitutional monarchism Portuguese nationalism Conservatism; Christian democracy Euroscepticism; Agrarianism; Historically (before 1988): Localism; Green conservatism
- Political position: Right-wing
- National affiliation: AD (1979–1983); Basta! (2019); AD (2024–2025)
- European affiliation: European Christian Political Party
- International affiliation: International Monarchist Conference
- Colours: Blue
- Assembly of the Republic: 0 / 230
- European Parliament: 0 / 21
- Regional parliaments: 1 / 57
- Local government (Mayors): 0 / 308
- Local government (Parishes): 1 / 3,216

Election symbol
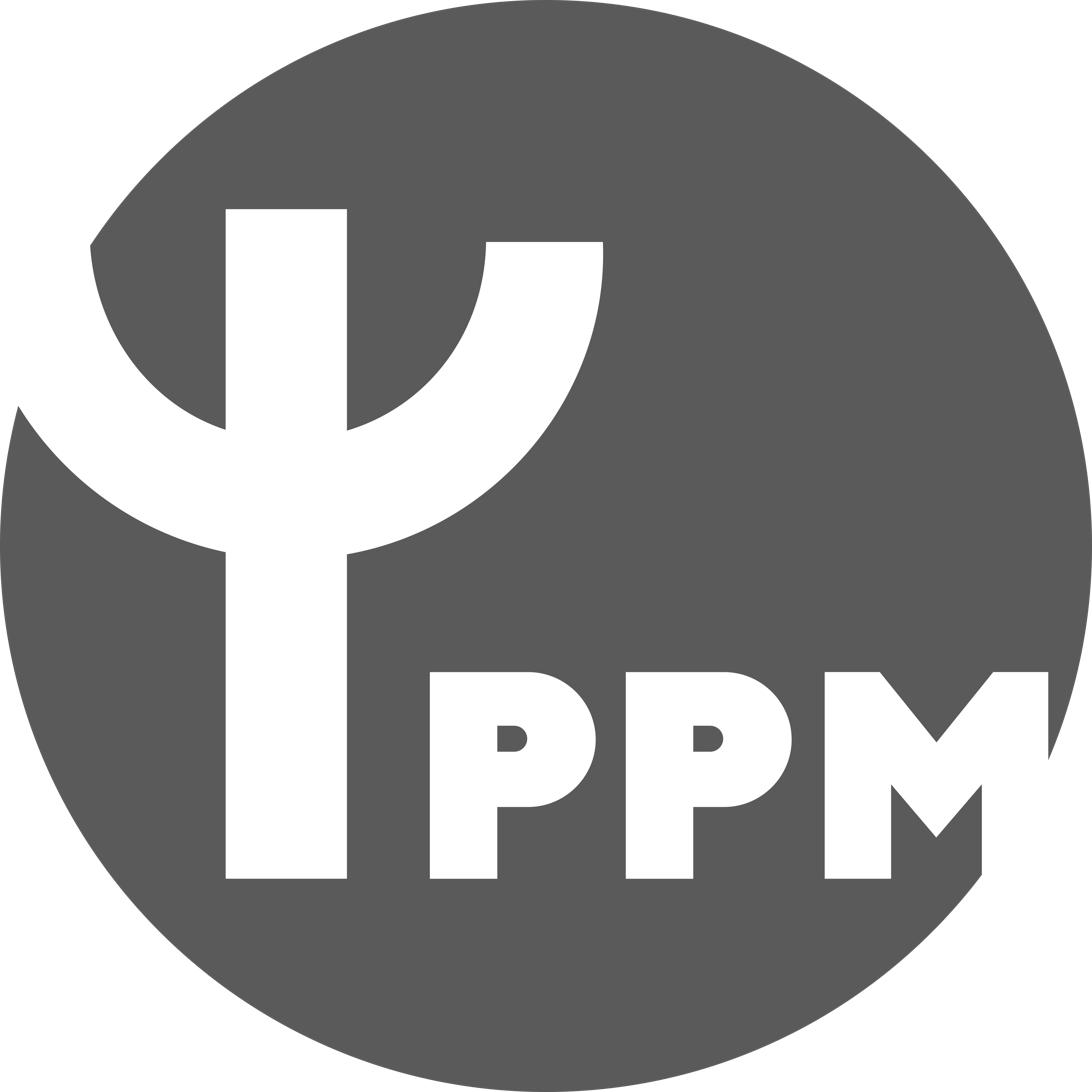

Party flag
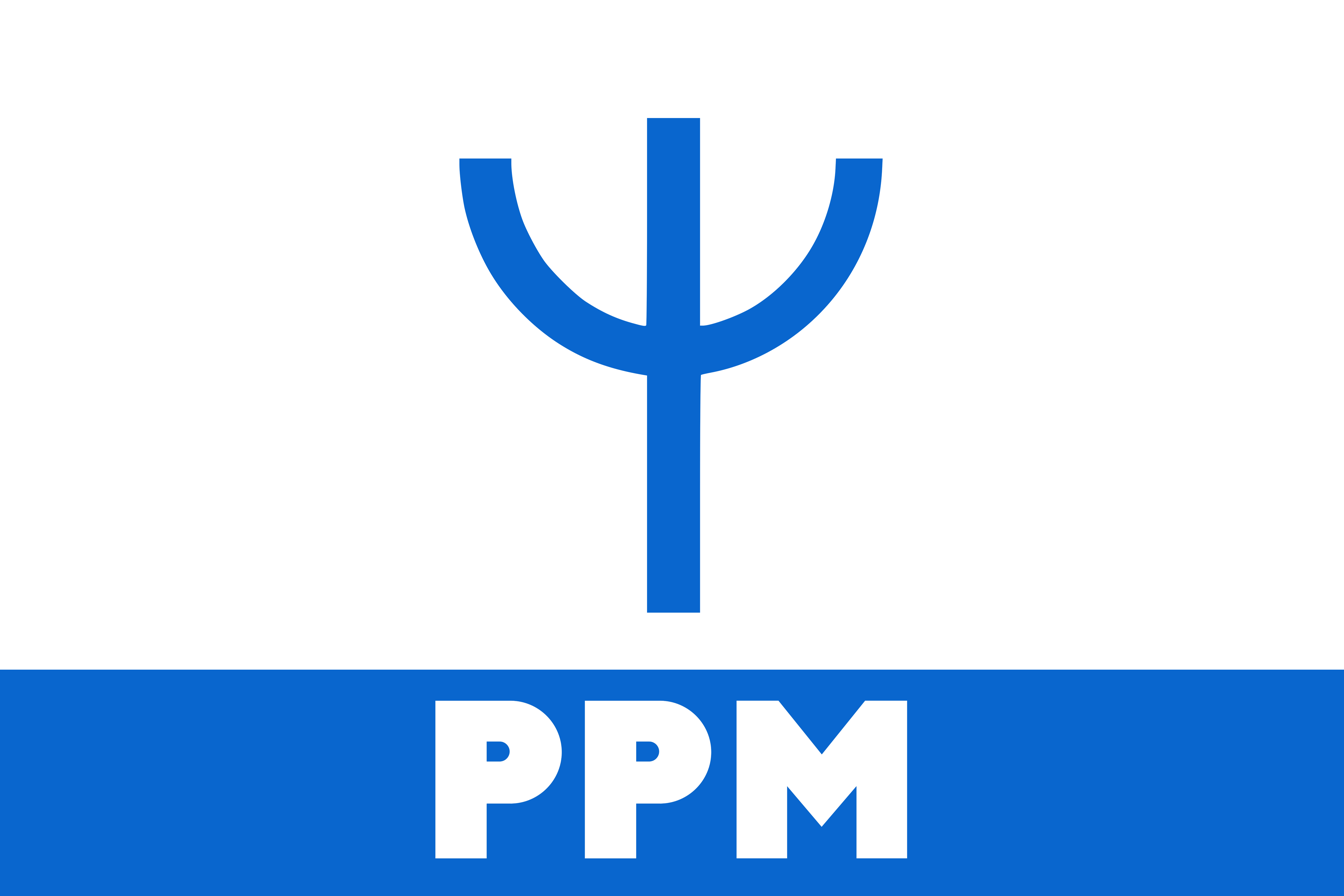

Website
- partidopopularmonarquico.pt

The People's Monarchist Party (Portuguese: Partido Popular Monárquico [pɐɾˈtiðu pupuˈlaɾ muˈnaɾkiku]) is a political party in Portugal. It was founded in 1974 in an effort to unify Monarchist political forces opposed to the Estado Novo and supportive of the Carnation Revolution's restoration of democracy.

The party seeks the restoration of the Portuguese monarchy, however, since 2008, argue that the leading claimants to the Portuguese throne, the House of Braganza, are illegitimate, instead supporting the House of Loulé. The People's Monarchist Party is a member of the International Monarchist Conference and the European Christian Political Party.

== Background ==
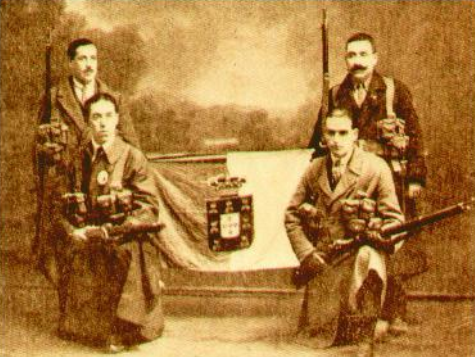
Monarchist militants during the ill-fated Monarchy of the North.

The "blue and white" flag of the Kingdom of Portugal remains a popular symbol among monarchists and are the colors of the PPM.

Portugal had been a Monarchy from its foundation in 1143 until 1910, often associated with the House of Braganza who secured Portuguese independence from Spain in 1640 after the extinction of the House of Aviz and the ensuing Iberian Union. From 1828 to 1834 the House of Braganza fought a civil war between two of its factions, the Miguelists and the Constitutionalists, with the former supporting the more absolutist and traditionalist Miguel I the uncle of the ruling Maria II who usurped power from his niece arguing that women couldn't inherit the throne retroactively, while the latter supported Maria and where led by her father Pedro I, who abdicated in favor of his daughter to become Emperor of Brazil in 1826. The Liberals would win, and Maria II was restored to the throne, and although Miguel renounced his claim to the throne, his descendants still claim royal legitimacy.

Calls to abolish the Monarchy in favor of a Republic started in earnest in 1890 when the Kingdom caved to a British ultimatum to abandon the Pink Map which proved to be a massive national embarrassment. In 1908 Republicans would massacre the royal family, killing both the king, Carlos I, and his son and heir Luís Filipe with the then 18-year-old Manuel II ascending to the throne. Although Manuel was well liked he was unable to repair the deteriorating status of the Monarchy, and on 5 October 1910, a Republican revolution succeeded in toppling the monarchy and forcing the royal family into exile in the United Kingdom. Elements of the military, however, remained loyal to the monarchy, and attempted to restore it which culminated in the Monarchy of the North, which saw Monarchists military formations seize Portugal's second largest city, Porto, in 1919 as a launching point to restore royal control over the entire country. The monarchists, however, failed to gain any notable public support in the rest of the country, and after a Republican counter-attack, the Monarchy of the North was abolished before the end of the year with Monarchism becoming politically ostracized.

The exiled Miguel of Braganza died suddenly in 1932 with no heirs meaning the Miguelist pretender, Duarte Nuno of Braganza, inherited the royal claim after allegedly reconciling with the main branch of the family shortly after their exile. Meanwhile, the Portuguese Republic drifted into Dictatorship, with António de Oliveira Salazar declaring the Estado Novo in 1932 under the stringently Catholic and Traditionalist ideology of Integralismo Lusitano. Salazar sought to repair relations with the still exiled royal family, rescinding their order of exile and allowing them to return to Portugal in 1950. After the death of President Óscar Carmona in 1951 Salazar briefly entertained the idea of restoring the Monarchy in a purely ceremonial role to tie his regime to the historical continuity of the Portuguese Empire, however, instead opted to hold an "election" where his ally Francisco Craveiro Lopes ran unopposed. This was largely seen by Monarchists as a betrayal, with Monarchists becoming some of the most vocal and politically active opponents to Salazar during the Estado Novo. Due to costly colonial wars the Estado Novo was overthrown by the Carnation Revolution on April 25th, 1974.

== History ==
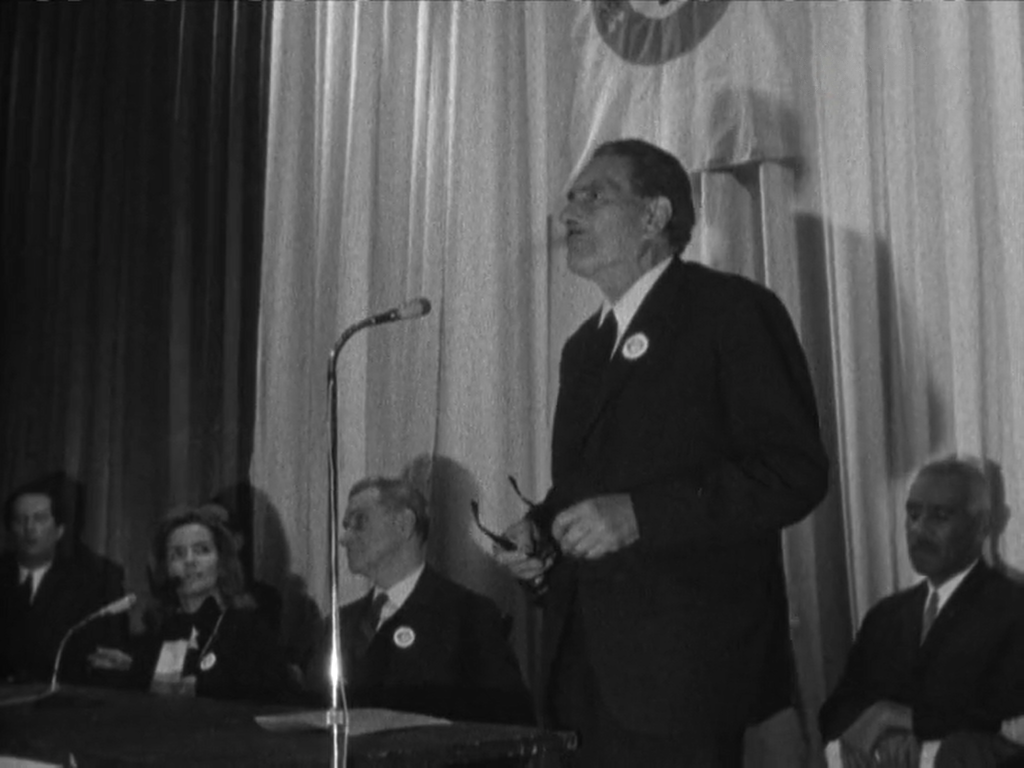
The PPM's founder, Francisco Rolão Preto, speaking to the "Monarchist Electoral Commission" in 1969 prior to the unification of monarchists forces into the PPM in 1974.

The People's Monarchist Party was founded shortly after the Carnation Revolution on May 23rd, 1974, by Francisco Rolão Preto who was elected the party's first President in an attempt to unify the various disparate monarchist groups in the country, however, due to his controversial earlier political beliefs, being the leader of the Fascist National Syndicalists, quickly handed leadership over to Gonçalo Ribeiro Telles. Duarte Nuno died in 1976, with his son, Duarte Pio of Braganza, succeeding him as the royal pretender.

In 1979 the PPM entered an electoral pact with the Social Democratic Party and CDS – People's Party called the Democratic Alliance, which sought to create a unified right-wing ticket to oppose the Socialists who came to power in the Carnation Revolution. The AD would win the 1979 and 1980 elections, and in return, the PPM was granted several ministerial posts, including Telles being named the "Minister for Quality of Life" however, the bloc fell apart following the 1982 local elections.

=== Post Democratic Alliance ===
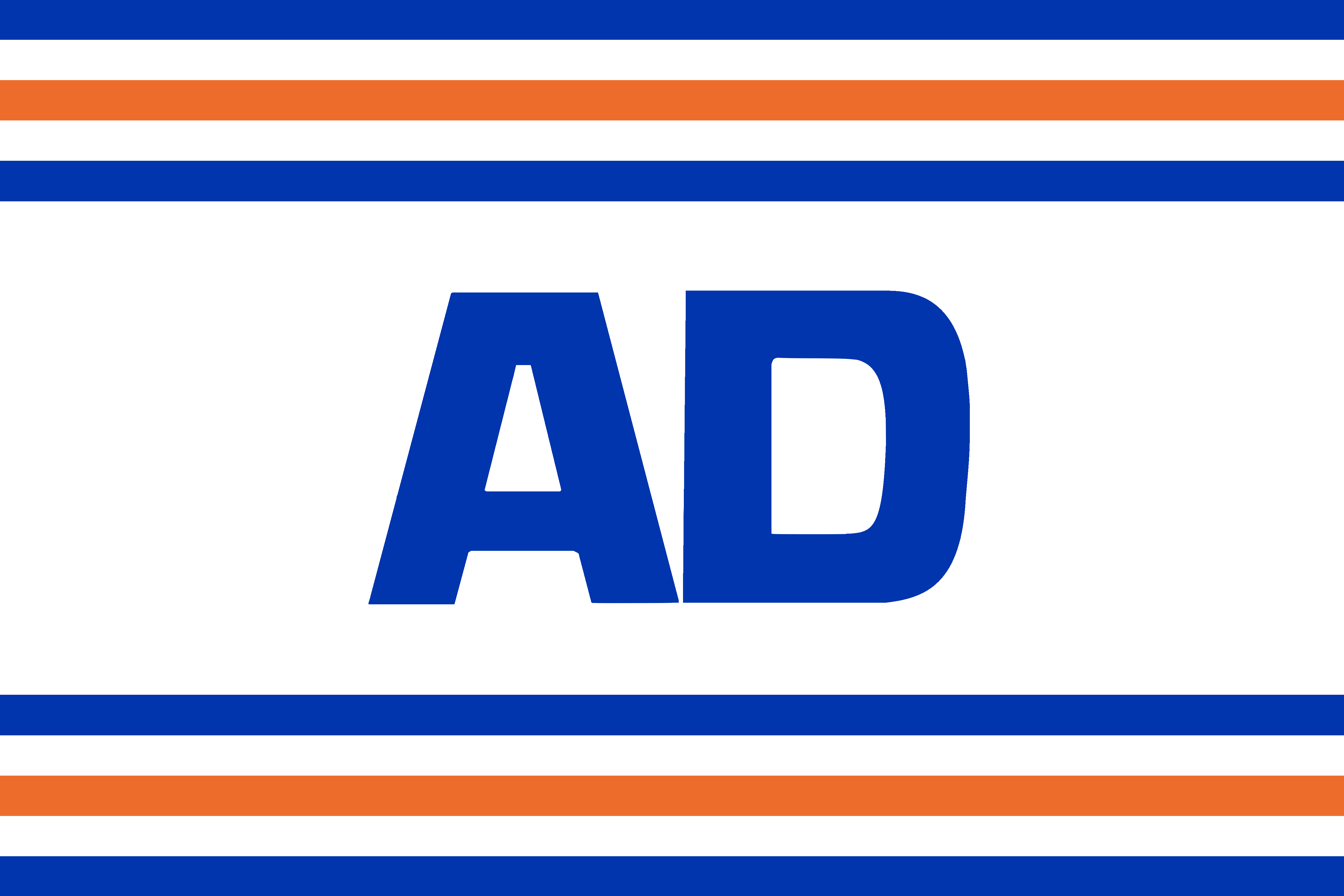
The PPM was one of the three members of the Democratic Alliance and struggled to make any meaningful electoral gains after its dissolution.

Following the breakup of the AD, the PPM would continue as a marginal force in Portuguese politics, with only one MP, Ribeiro Telles, until his departure from the party in 1988 when he split to form his own green political party, the Earth Party. Ribeiro Telles had turned the PPM into a sort of conservative green party of its own, forming an alliance with municipal localists and green leaders to some marginal electoral success, however, due to this, became increasingly unpopular with the monarchist establishment in the PPM. Ribeiro Telles would be succeeded by former MP Augusto Ferreira do Amaral who led aristocracy advocacy groups and pressure groups calling for a monarchical restoration.

Ferreira do Amaral did not break with Ribeiro Telles municipal and green alliance, but instead looked to strengthen the party's monarchist core within this coalition. He also realized that the PPM, on its own, wasn't a viable party to win national elections, so instead worked heavily with the PSD, winning their sanction to stand municipal ballots, with a somewhat sizable power-base in Lisbon. Ferreira do Amaral's tenure as party leader collapsed with the appointment of Luís Coimbra to a vacant seat on the Lisbon Municipal Chamber. Coimbra, who was a member of the PPM, joined the council as a member of the PSD, breaking the two parties coordination agreements in municipal politics, and driving a wedge between them on a national level. As Ferreira do Amaral was the leading voice in favor of this alliance he bore the brunt of the blame within the party for it breaking up, leading to his resignation in 1990.

At the party's XIII Congress it elected Nuno Cardoso da Silva as its new leader. During this time frame the party again faded into obscurity, shedding its alliance with local and green politicians to reinforce its monarchistic core, at the cost of what little popular support it had. The party sought to stand on its own in national elections, instead of as a member of a coalition, but only got 25,216 votes (~0.03%) in the 1991 legislative election. Due to the party not making any significant gains in elections, Cardoso da Silva would also resign in 1993, but notably, in his resignation speech, levied criticism against Duarte Pio for treating the PPM as a rubber stamp for his own political aspirations.

da Silva was replaced by Fernando Manuel Moreira de Sá Monteiro, a noted genealogist and historian representing a more scholarly and "dynastic" view of the party as a vehicle for the nobility. Notably de Sá Monteiro was a close ally of Duarte Pio, having received many "royal honors" from the royal house. Sá Monteiro attempted to continue Cardoso da Silva's policy of standing for national elections, without much success, but was more focused on preserving doctrinal consistency and identity as monarchists opposed to the Portuguese republic, instead of a more generic conservative party.

Sá Monteiro was replaced as party leader in 1997 with Miguel Pignatelli Queiroz who sought to revive the PPM's older strategy of working with a larger party for national elections and to instead focus on local ones. To this end in 1991 he signed an official coalition agreement with the CDS-PP for the 2002 legislative election. However, he would pivot to returning to the PSD fold, signing a coalition agreement which finally saw the PPM re-enter parliament for the first time in almost two decades after the 2005 legislative election, with two PPM candidates winning seats. Queiroz would be surprisingly defeated in his re-election bid for party leader by Nuno da Câmara Pereira, losing the election 31-61 following low turnout to the party congress.

=== Break with the House of Braganza ===
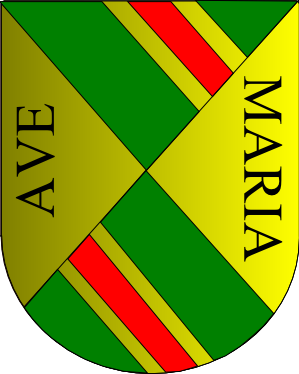
In 2008 the PPM broke with the House of Braganza (coat of arms left) in favor of claiming the House of Loulé (coat of arms right) as the rightful pretenders to the Portuguese throne.

Pereira took the party in a radical new direction. Campaigning on improving youth support for monarchism, he also voiced opposition to the European Constitution and pressed for Portuguese irredentist claims on Olivença, as well as stringent "political morality" by taking firmer, more conservative, stances on social issues. Despite this, in May 2006, Duarte Pio was called the Duke of Braganza in an official capacity by the PSD-led Parliament of Portugal.

Câmara Pereira began to challenge the until then unchecked power of Duarte Pio within the party, arguing that Duarte Pio and his father had no claim to the Portuguese throne, due to the Miguelists forfeiting their claim after the 1826 civil war. In 2008 Pereira wrote a book The Dukes of Loulé and the Succession to the Crown of Portugal, where he argued that the Duke of Loulé, the descendants of Nuno José Severo de Mendoça Rolim de Moura Barreto, the uncle-in-law of Luís I of Portugal who reigned from 1861 to 1889, should've become the Constitutionalist claimant, making Câmara Pereira's cousin, Pedro José Folque de Mendoça Rolim de Moura Barreto, the rightful pretender to the crown.

Pereira also broke from the electoral pact with the PSD, opting instead to stand the PPM on its own. This would result in a catastrophic defeat for the PPM in the 2009 legislative election, where they won only 15,262 votes, or 0.27% of the electorate, losing both of their seats in parliament and again moving to the fringes of Portuguese politics. Shortly afterwards in 2010, Câmara Pereira resigned from leadership due to "personal reasons."

=== Azorean stronghold ===
Pereira was succeeded by Paulo Estêvão one of the few remaining PPM elected politicians, being elected as a deputy of the Legislative Assembly of the Azores in the 2008 election. Estêvão knew that voters in the Azores had been a consistent base for the PPM and retooled the party to focus on local Azorean issues. He published a manifesto; Excerpts from A Monarchical Opposition to the Azorean Caesarist Regime, where he called the Azorean government tyrannical for seeking a unity state over the archipelago and instead advocated for populist devolution of powers to municipalities, readopted many of the environmental positions the party had abandoned since the departure of Ferreira do Amaral while also promoting a distinct Azorean cultural identity. Estêvão was able to establish a regional grassroots support base in the Azores, advocating for smaller, more isolated islands, and won re-election to his seat in Corvo in 2012 and 2016. However, Estêvão would resign as leader in 2017, being succeeded by Gonçalo da Câmara Pereira.

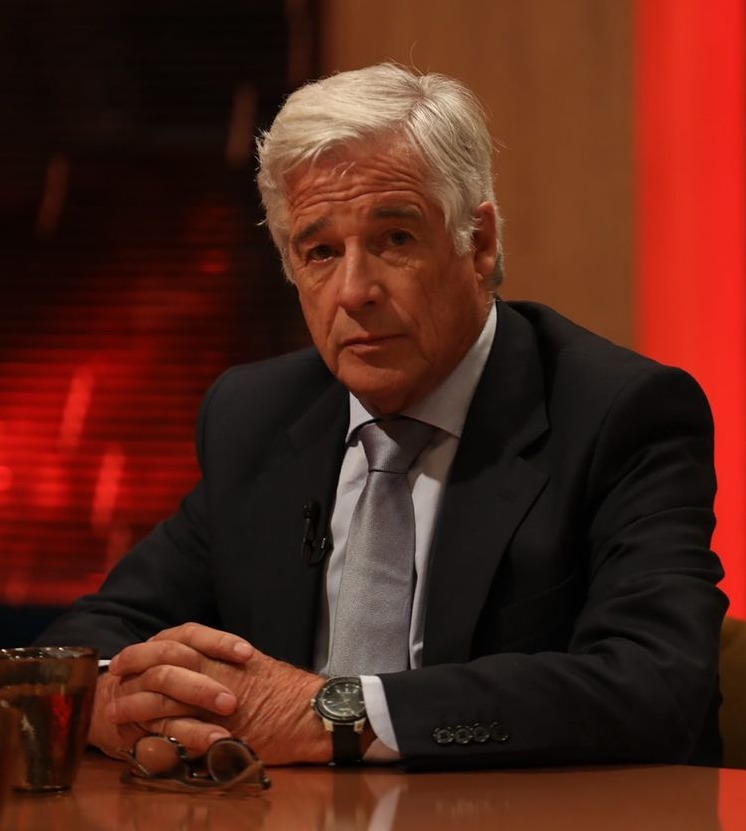
Current PPM leader Gonçalo da Câmara Pereira took over leadership in 2017 and has sought the party's reentry into national politics.

Pereira, while still keeping the party focused on the Azores, also began to look out at national politics, searching for a coalition partner just days after taking office. In 2019 he worked out a deal with Chega where he would join their Basta! coalition for the 2019 European elections while keeping their campaign focused on the Azores in an attempt to have the PPM be more included in national political dialogues.

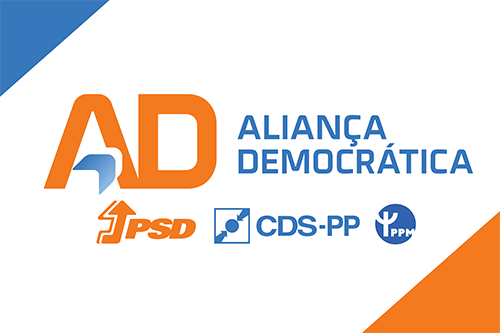
The PPM was a member of the Revived AD from 2024 to 2025.

By 2021 the PPM began to win local elections in mainland Portugal, with Câmara Pereira winning a seat on the Lisbon Assembleia Municipal. Shortly after the PSD began talks of re-forming the AD in order to better contest the 2024 elections to break the Socialist Party's nearly 10 year rule since 2015. Although the PPM initially refused to join the reformed AD, citing its "weakness" and "lack of vision" they would ultimately join the bloc in time for the 2024 Azorean regional election which the coalition won. Despite the coalition also winning the 2024 legislative election the sole district where the PPM stood a candidate, Lisbon, saw the AD come up short of the required number of seats won to allot one to the PPM. However, the party also chose to stand candidates on Madeira independently of the AD showcasing a general unease within the PPM over their role in the AD.

Shortly after the election the PPM had a falling out with the AD due to their candidate not being placed higher on the list so they could've gotten a seat and left the bloc on a national level, but are still part of the AD regional coalition in the Azores. Nationally, the AD replaced the PPM with their splinter, the Earth Party.

== Organization ==
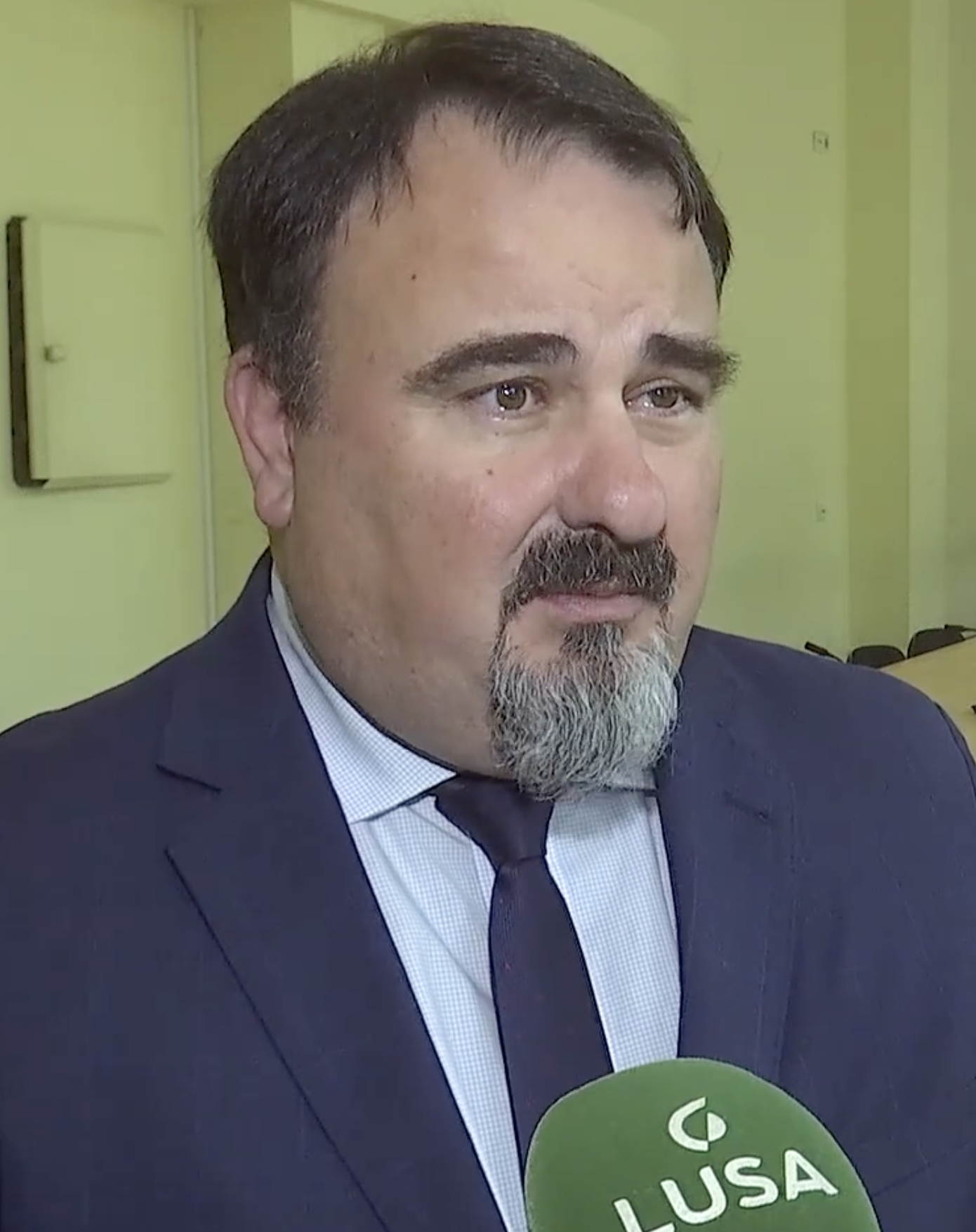
Paulo Estêvão, President of the PPM from 2010 until 2017

=== Leaders ===
- Francisco Rolão Preto 1974
- Gonçalo Ribeiro Telles, 1974–1988
- Augusto Ferreira do Amaral, 1988–1990
- Nuno Cardoso da Silva, 1990–1993
- Fernando de Sá Monteiro, 1993–1997
- Miguel Pignatelli Queiroz, 1997–2005
- Nuno da Câmara Pereira, 2005–2010
- Paulo Estêvão, 2010–2017
- Gonçalo da Câmara Pereira, 2017–present

=== Elected members ===
==== Members of the Assembly of the Republic ====
10th Legislature (2005 – 2009)
- Nuno Câmara Pereira (Lisbon)
- Miguel Pignatelli Queiroz (Porto)
4th Legislature (1985 – 1987)
- Gonçalo Ribeiro Telles (Lisbon)
  Augusto Ferreira do Amaral – from January 1986 to October 1986
2nd Legislature (1980 – 1983)
- Gonçalo Ribeiro Telles (Lisbon)
  António Sousa Lara – from September 1981 to June 1983
- Augusto Ferreira do Amaral (Lisbon)
  António Sousa Lara – from January 1981 to June 1981
- António Cardoso Moniz (Porto)
  Eurico Gondim – from March 1981 to April 1981
- Luís Coimbra (Aveiro)
  Maria José Pontes Gouveia – from January 1981 to February 1981
- Henrique Barrilaro Ruas (Braga)
  Amadeu Sá Menezes – from March 1981 to March 1981
- António Borges de Carvalho (Viseu)
  Jorge Portugal da Silveira – from September 1981 to March 1982
1st Legislature (1979 – 1980)
- Gonçalo Ribeiro Telles (Lisbon)
- Augusto Ferreira do Amaral (Lisbon)
- Luís Coimbra (Leiria)
- António Borges de Carvalho (Viseu)
  João Osório Mateus– from May 1980 to June 1980
- Henrique Barrilaro Ruas (Viana do Castelo)

== Notable members ==
- Henrique Barrilaro Ruas
- Francisco Rolão Preto
- Gonçalo Ribeiro Telles
- António Sousa Lara
- Paulo Estêvão
- Gonçalo da Câmara Pereira

== Election results ==
=== Assembly of the Republic ===
Election	Leader	Votes	%	Seats	+/-	Government
1975	Gonçalo Ribeiro Telles	32,526	0.6 (#10)	0 / 250		No seats
1976	Gonçalo Ribeiro Telles	28,320	0.5 (#10)	0 / 263	0	No seats
1979	Gonçalo Ribeiro Telles	Democratic Alliance		5 / 250	▲5	Coalition
1980	Gonçalo Ribeiro Telles	Democratic Alliance		6 / 250	▲1	Coalition
1983	Gonçalo Ribeiro Telles	27,635	0.5 (#6)	0 / 250	▼6	No seats
1985	Gonçalo Ribeiro Telles	with PS		1 / 250	▲1	Opposition
1987	Gonçalo Ribeiro Telles	23,218	0.4 (#10)	0 / 250	▼1	No seats
1991	Nuno Cardoso da Silva	25,216	0.4 (#9)	0 / 230	0	No seats
1995	Fernando de Sá Monteiro	Ecology & Future		0 / 230	0	No seats
1999	Miguel Pignatelli Queiroz	16,522	0.3 (#8)	0 / 230	0	No seats
2002	Miguel Pignatelli Queiroz	12,398	0.2 (#8)	0 / 230	0	No seats
2005	Nuno da Câmara Pereira	with PSD		2 / 230	▲2	Opposition
2009	Nuno da Câmara Pereira	15,262	0.3 (#10)	0 / 230	▼2	No seats
2011	Paulo Estêvão	14,687	0.3 (#12)	0 / 230	0	No seats
2015	Paulo Estêvão	14,916	0.3 (#14)	0 / 230	0	No seats
2019	Gonçalo da Câmara Pereira	8,389	0.2 (#19)	0 / 230	0	No seats
2022	Gonçalo da Câmara Pereira	260	0.0 (#23)	0 / 230	0	No seats
2024	Gonçalo da Câmara Pereira	Democratic Alliance		0 / 230	0	No seats
2025	Gonçalo da Câmara Pereira	5,616	0.1 (#17)	0 / 230	0	No seats

=== European Parliament ===
Election	Leader	Votes	%	Seats	+/–	EP Group
1987	Miguel Esteves Cardoso	155,990	2.77 (#6)	0 / 24	New	–
1989	Miguel Esteves Cardoso	56,900	2.03 (#5)	0 / 24	0	–
1994	Paula Marinho	8,300	0.27 (#11)	0 / 25	0	–
1999		16,182	0.45 (#7)	0 / 25	0	–
2004	Gonçalo da Câmara Pereira	15,454	0.45 (#7)	0 / 24	0	–
2009	Frederico Duarte Carvalho	14,414	0.40 (#11)	0 / 22	0	–
2014	Nuno Correia da Silva	17,185	0.45 (#11)	0 / 21	0	–
2019	André Ventura	Basta!		0 / 21	0	–
2024	Sebastião Bugalho	Democratic Alliance		0 / 21	0	–

=== Presidential elections ===
Election	Candidate	First round		Second round		Result
Election	Candidate	Votes	%	Votes	%	Result
1980	António Soares Carneiro	2,325,481	40.8 (#2)			Lost ✗
1986	No candidate					
1991	Supported Basílio Horta					Lost ✗
1996	No candidate					
2001	No candidate					
2006	No candidate					
2011	No candidate					
2016	Supported Marcelo Rebelo de Sousa					Won ✓
2021	Gonçalo da Câmara Pereira	Withdrew				
2026	Supported Henrique Gouveia e Melo					Lost ✗

=== Regional Assemblies ===
==== Azorean Regional Parliament ====
Election	Leader	Votes	%	Seats	+/-	Government
1984		41	0.0 (#8)	0 / 47		No seats
1988		162	0.2 (#9)	0 / 47	0	No seats
1992		AD – Azores		0 / 47	0	No seats
2000	Paulo Estêvão	Democratic Convergence		0 / 47		No seats
2004	Paulo Estêvão	293	0.3 (#6)	0 / 47	0	No seats
2008	Paulo Estêvão	423	0.5 (#8)	1 / 47	▲1	Opposition
2012	Paulo Estêvão	86	0.1 (#12)	1 / 47	0	Opposition
2016	Paulo Estêvão	866	0.9 (#7)	1 / 47	0	Opposition
2020	Paulo Estêvão	2,415	2.3 (#6)	2 / 47	▲1	Coalition (Note: Minority coalition government PSD-CDS–PP-PPM)
2024	Paulo Estêvão	PSD/CDS/PPM		1 / 47	▼1	Coalition

== See also ==
- Integralismo Lusitano
- Miguelism
