= 1841 Caída da Praia earthquake =

Earthquake

1841 Caída da Praia
- Location within Azores
- Local date: 15 June 1841
- Magnitude: ?? [data missing]
- Epicenter: 38.4°N 25.3°W
- Areas affected: Azores
- Max. intensity: MMI X (Extreme)
- Foreshocks: 12 June 1841

The 1841 Caída da Praia earthquake (1841 Fall of Praia), also known as the Second Caída da Praia, was a series of seismic events occurring between 12 June and 15 June 1841, on the island of Terceira in the Portuguese archipelago of the Azores. Similar in scope to the first 1614 ''Caída da Praia'' earthquake that destroyed most of the community, this second event is noted for the systematic process to assistance, document and catalogue the events of the tragedy.

== History ==
The earthquake began on the morning of 12 June 1841, and was centred in the Ramo Grande area of the island of Terceira. The numerous earthquakes persisted throughout the day, and lead to intense rumbling on 13 June, resulting in the destruction of buildings and forcing people from their homes in Praia and nearby parishes. The 1641 catastrophe was already vivid in the minds of most, perpetuated by the Romantic prose of Francisco de Segura, and the townsfolk were already helped by innovative decrees issued by King Philip II after the events of the earlier tragedy.

Still, on the morning of 14 of June, new earthquakes resulted in further destruction.

Around 3:25 on the morning of 15 June, a violent earthquake caused the destruction of Praia and in Fontinhas, with general damage in eastern and northeast of Terceira, around Vila de São Sebastião and Agualva. From the beach until Cruz do Marco, a fissure opened-up, marking the fault that existed. The most damage occurred in Fontinhas, a parish where most of the buildings were affected.

== Relief efforts ==
Since most of the townsfolk had abandoned their homes, there were no deaths, but hundreds of buildings were damaged in Santa Cruz, Fontinhas, Lajes, São Brás, Vila Nova, Agualva, Cabo da Praia, Porto Martins, Fonte do Bastardo and São Sebastião. Félix José da Costa Júnior, then secretary to the civil governor and the man responsible for providing assist to the victims of the disaster, eventually wrote Memória Histórica do Horrível Terramoto de 1841, wherein he described the circumstances and affects on the parishes of the Ramo Grande region from the earthquake:

- São Sebastião – town erected in 1503, situated a mile from the sea, and two leagues and a half east of the city of Angra do Heroísmo. There are 252 homes and 1511 souls: there are 14 houses that were ruined, and 154 with serious damage, principally those that are on the northeast frontier. The Matriz church became cut, along the presbytery, and the three branch hermitages also suffered.
- Fonte do Bastardo – in this parish, that has 146 homes and 639 souls, walls are rare, that have not be demolished, presents six houses totally ruined, and 32 gravely damaged. The house of the Reverend Vicar, the best there, and constructed two years earlier received a violent concussion in the right side, from the port of Praia, that fell to the left. The Church suffered some damage. I observed that the arch of the altar was faltering, and it was that the impulse, that could open a door, between the principal sacristy and the minor sacristy.
- Cabo da Praia – situated a league south of Praia, which has 205 homes and 962 souls, presented five houses in ruin, and 70 gravely damaged. The Church suffered great damage in the tower, which fell; and the walls of the cemetery were totally destroyed.
- Lagens – There are 577 homes and 2663 souls. There 12 houses that were totally ruined, and 60 with grave damage. The church, with the concussion opened a few cracks in its walls, had its nave greatly weakened, and belltower cracked. The hermitage of Remédios appeared to be slashed. Almost all the divisionary walls were down.
- Fontinhas – There are 242 houses and 1066 souls. There 137 houses that were totally ruined, and 88 com great ruined. The demolition of the buildings, due to the position that they fell, show that the great concussion came from the northeast, and that the vertical shock affect the foundations.
- Vila Nova – There are 247 houses and 1203 souls; and presented three houses totally in ruin, and 81 with grave ruins: almost all the chimneys, in their majority, fell. The church also suffered, as with the hermitage of Ajuda, which belong to the majorat of the Baron of Noronha.
- Agualva – There are 267 houses, 1186 souls. There were two houses in total ruin, and 30 gravely ruined. The belltower of the church inclined to the north. Above Outeiro do Filipe many of the divisionary walls fell, as I observed on 4 July, when I crossed those fields to examine the roads.

By 1836, the archipelago of the Azores was divided into three districts, due to this politico-administrative reorganization resulting from the Liberal Reforms there were new bodies that emerged to assist in causes of emergency, and specifically, natural disasters common in the Azores.

== Aftermath ==
When the town of Praia and surrounding parishes were ruined by the earthquake, management of the disaster and reconstruction was already secured by the Administrator-General of the district of Angra do Heroísmo, José Silvestre Ribeiro, and by administrative officials of the Civil Governor. In order to handle the calamity, José Silvestre Ribeiro created a network of commissions at the parish-level, so-called Comissões de Soccorros, presided by their respective parish priest, with rigorous instructions from a central Comissão dos Soccorros. The parameters for the reconstruction were defined by change and innovation:

What is needed is that the town of Praia should become better constructed then before...what is desired is that one day they should say, If here passed a genie of destruction, then afterward there came hands of goodwill and constructive, that built from the ruins buildings, that become more beautiful and solid...That, to turn the most famous and more regular the notable town of Praia, provide better direction to its roads, or repair whatever deffect, then before known, it was necessary to make a few expenses, then the Commission will not hesitate...

The Commission then ordered that the construction of houses of straw should desist, a characteristic that was common at the time and that produced a poor, melancholy skyline. From this point forward, the characteristic tiled rooftop became the norm in the region. At the same time, the Commission issued instructions on the form and style to be applied in the reconstruction of the buildings; there were provisions stating that buildings should be symmetrical, uniform and proportional along each road, repairing errors in construction that had perpetuated in the village, including squares, roads and homes.

In order to guarantee financial resources, José Silvestre Ribeiro requested funds from the municipal councils of his district (on the islands of Terceira, Graciosa and São Jorge) in addition to soliciting assistance from the districts of Ponta Delgada and Horta. The philanthropic movement extended to the Portuguese capital and many of the districts in the Kingdom, where small commissions were created to collect funds to assist the village. For this mobilization, Praia da Vitória itself contributed to its own cause: national elites considered the town a national monument and sacred land for the Liberal cause. Cultural societies and recreational groups extended the network, linking the Terceirense town to various groups in Europe and Brazil, who also sent contributions.

A 20 February 1844 report published the public projects completed on public buildings and houses, classifying them as to the economic condition of their residents (poor and less disadvantaged) and the type of intervention (new building or repairs). Thirty-three homes constructed of straw were constructed in tile. Between 1841 and 1845, there a social change, resulting in rebuilding, change and innovation after the earthquake, organized by the district powers, that articulated the pleas for help to the archipelago, national government, European powers and Brazil. This process transformed the skyline of the municipality of Praia da Vitória.

== See also ==
- List of earthquakes in the Azores
- List of historical earthquakes
