= Agualva =

Agualva may refer to the following parishes in Portugal:

- Agualva (Praia da Vitória), in the Azores
- Agualva (Sintra), Portugal
- Agualva-Cacém, Portugal
