= Lajes (Praia da Vitória) =

- Civil parish
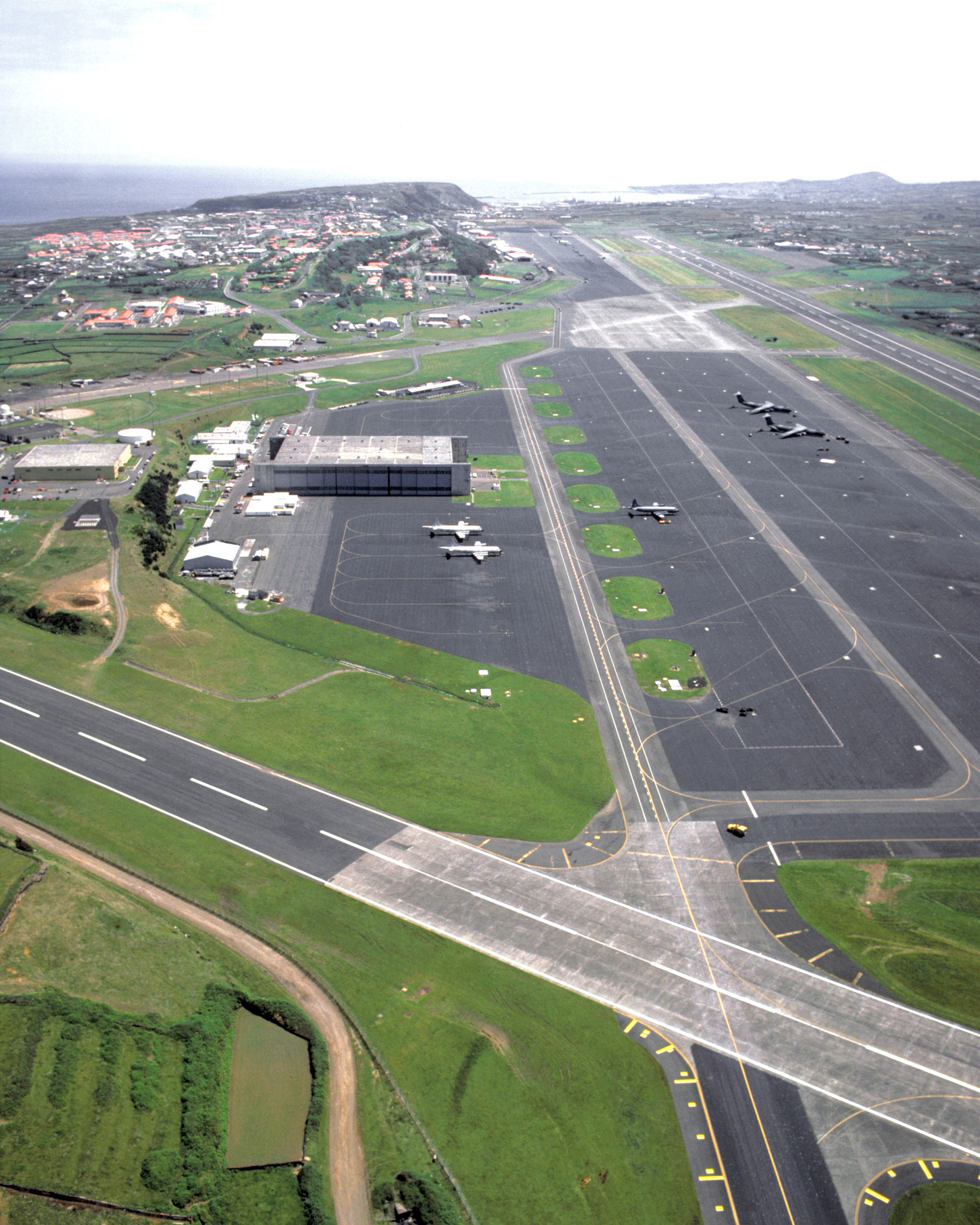
- The northern portion of Lajes Airfield

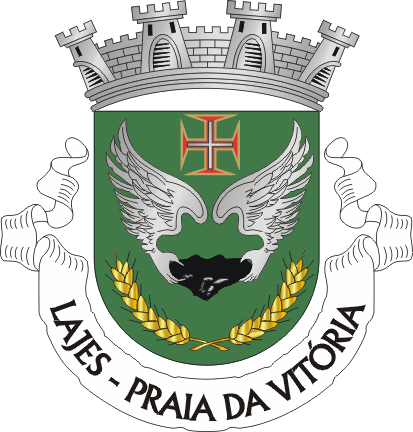
- Coat of arms

- Location in the Azores Lajes (Terceira)
- Coordinates: 38°45′45″N 27°6′21″W
- Country: Portugal
- Auton. region: Azores
- Island: Terceira
- Municipality: Praia da Vitória
- Established: Settlement: fl. 1500; Parish: fl. 3 April 1507; Civil parish: fl. 1614; Town: 12 June 2002

Area
  - Total: 12.11 km^{2} (4.68 sq mi)
- Elevation: 63 m (207 ft)

Population (2011)
  - Total: 3,744
  - Density: 309.2/km^{2} (800.7/sq mi)
- Time zone: UTC−01:00 (AZOT)
  - Summer (DST): UTC+00:00 (AZOST)
- Postal code: 9760-292
- Area code: 292
- Patron: São Miguel Arcanjo
- Website: www.jflajes.com

Lajes is a civil parish in the municipality of Praia da Vitória, on the Portuguese island of Terceira in the Azores. The population in 2011 was 3,744, in an area of 12.11 square kilometres (4.68 mi^{2}). It is the second most populous parish in the municipality of Praia da Vitória. It contains the localities Fundões, Caldeira, Canada da Caldeira, Canada das Fontainhas, Canada das Vinhas, Canada do Poço, Lajedo, Lajes, Picão, Rebentão and Santa Rita.

Lajes is best known for being the location of Portuguese Air Force Base No.4, used for military, small inter-island, as well as scheduled and chartered flights from North America and mainland Europe. The U.S. military has a multi-year agreement with the government of Portugal at Lajes Airfield, which is the base for U.S. 65th Air Base Wing (65 ABW).

== History ==
There is reference to the navigator Pero de Barcelos, who was one of the first settlers in the region, dating to 3 April 1507. Lajes is thought to have been elevated to the status of town in 1515.

The date of the construction of the original church is unknown. It was burned by English privateers in 1587, and destroyed during the 1614 Cáida da Praia earthquake, which caused considerable destruction to Lajes and surrounding parishes.

Owing to natural qualities, Lajes was the preferred residency of rich and noble families, resulting in it being referred to as A Madrid dos Açores ('The Madrid of the Azores'). Many of the estates and lands supported rest of Terceira, thus earning the epithet Celeiro da Terceira (the 'breadbasket of Terceira'). There are several references to the quantity and quality of the produce in the region, including fruit and wine, in addition to silk production. Lajes is located on a vast fertile plain, divided by hedge rows and where many old seigneurial homes still reflect the importance of farming and prosperity of the traditional families of the island. Many of the modern roadways that intersect the parish today were once used by farmers to transport goods, usually using the large Ramo Grande oxen, pulling large carts. Wood would normally be transported, burned to maintain the warmth during the winter, or for cooking bread in earthen ovens. The oxen, the seigneurial homes and agricultural community became known as the Ramo Grande.

Along with Santa Cruz, Lajes also became the site, during and after the Second World War, for British and American forces stationed at Area Base No. 4, supporting progress and providing a dynamic economic innovator for the parish and region.

== Geography ==
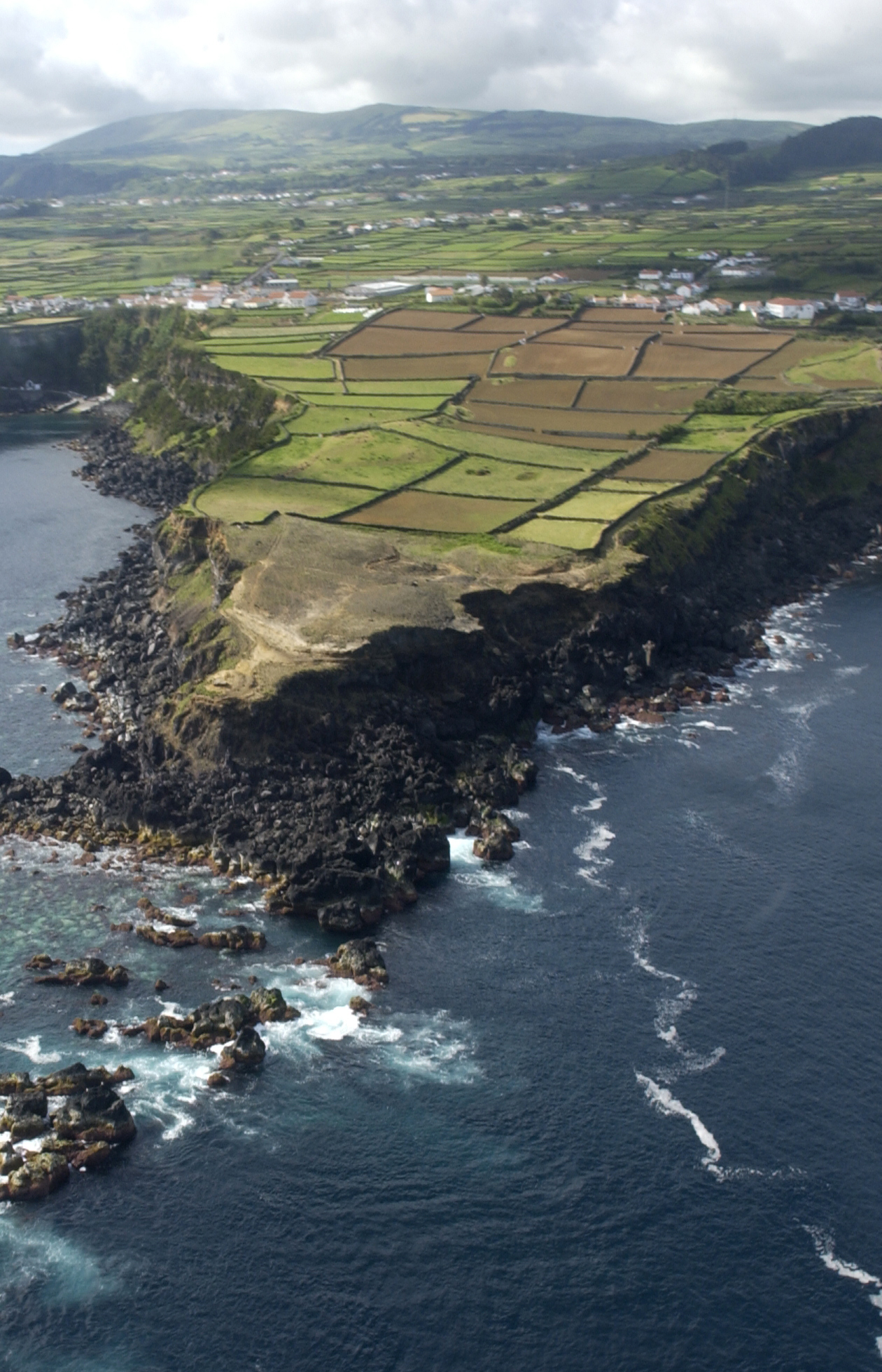
A portion of the north-eastern coastline of Lajes, showing rural nature and rugged rock cliffs

Lajes is situated on the northern coast of Terceira, bordered on the west by the parishes of Vila Nova and São Brás, to the east by Santa Cruz and south, by the parish of Fontinhas. The majority (over half) of the parish is occupied by Air Base No. 4, and the barracks/homes of Air Force personnel stationed on the base (including American and Portuguese servicemen). The remainder of the base is actually in the neighbouring civil parish of Santa Cruz.

The western frontier is delineated by the Ribeira da Areia that crosses into the interior, reaching the parishes of Vila Nova and São Brás. The border then skirts Lorais, until Fundões, and parts towards the interior again, intersecting at Rua do Terreiro, Rua das Covas, Rua dos Fundões and Rua Padre Gregório B. Rocha, before arriving in Picão. The border then passes through the pasturelands of the interior, before aligning with the regional roadway at Santa Luzia, and running perpendicular towards the regional airport, bisecting the runway in the direction of Santa Rita, until the coast at Ponta dos Carneiros.

In addition to Ribeira da Areia and Ribeira dos Pães, the parish is crossed by subterranean branches of the Ribeira do Marques (that crosses the airport/air base).

== Climate ==
Lajes has a humid subtropical climate (Cfa) with warm summers and cool winters. Year round precipitation has a Mediterranean precipitation pattern. The influence of the Gulf Stream helps to limit extreme maxima and minima, with only a 27.2 °C (49 °F) overall extreme temperature difference. Lajes is very cloudy throughout the year. Humidity is also very high throughout the year.

Climate data for Lajes (Lajes Airport), 1973-1993 normals, 1944-1993 extremes, elevation: 52 m (171 ft)
Month	Jan	Feb	Mar	Apr	May	Jun	Jul	Aug	Sep	Oct	Nov	Dec	Year
Record high °C (°F)	21.1 (70.0)	21.1 (70.0)	22.2 (72.0)	23.9 (75.0)	24.4 (75.9)	27.8 (82.0)	28.9 (84.0)	30.0 (86.0)	30.0 (86.0)	28.3 (82.9)	23.9 (75.0)	22.9 (73.2)	30.0 (86.0)
Mean daily maximum °C (°F)	16.1 (61.0)	16.1 (61.0)	16.7 (62.1)	17.2 (63.0)	18.9 (66.0)	21.1 (70.0)	23.3 (73.9)	24.4 (75.9)	23.3 (73.9)	21.1 (70.0)	18.3 (64.9)	17.2 (63.0)	19.4 (66.9)
Daily mean °C (°F)	14.4 (57.9)	13.9 (57.0)	14.5 (58.1)	14.9 (58.8)	16.4 (61.5)	18.7 (65.7)	21.0 (69.8)	22.1 (71.8)	21.1 (70.0)	18.6 (65.5)	16.7 (62.1)	15.2 (59.4)	17.3 (63.1)
Mean daily minimum °C (°F)	12.2 (54.0)	11.7 (53.1)	11.7 (53.1)	12.2 (54.0)	13.9 (57.0)	16.1 (61.0)	17.8 (64.0)	18.9 (66.0)	17.8 (64.0)	16.1 (61.0)	14.4 (57.9)	12.8 (55.0)	14.4 (57.9)
Record low °C (°F)	2.8 (37.0)	4.4 (39.9)	5.0 (41.0)	5.6 (42.1)	7.2 (45.0)	7.8 (46.0)	11.7 (53.1)	12.2 (54.0)	11.1 (52.0)	8.3 (46.9)	5.6 (42.1)	5.6 (42.1)	2.8 (37.0)
Average precipitation mm (inches)	154.7 (6.09)	137.9 (5.43)	143.0 (5.63)	75.7 (2.98)	49.5 (1.95)	37.9 (1.49)	43.7 (1.72)	44.7 (1.76)	75.2 (2.96)	129.5 (5.10)	128.0 (5.04)	118.9 (4.68)	1,138.7 (44.83)
Average precipitation days (≥ 0.1 mm)	19	17	18	13	12	9	7	9	12	16	17	18	167
Average relative humidity (%)	79	79	79	77	78	79	78	77	78	78	80	79	78
Mean monthly sunshine hours	104	109	136	159	197	203	230	236	199	152	110	89	1,924
Source: Deutscher Wetterdienst (sun, 1961–1990) (Note: Station ID for Lajes (Acores) is 08509 Use this station ID to locate the sunshine duration)

Climate data for Lajes (Lajes Airport), elevation: 52 m or 171 ft, normals 1991-2020, extremes 1949-present
Month	Jan	Feb	Mar	Apr	May	Jun	Jul	Aug	Sep	Oct	Nov	Dec	Year
Record high °C (°F)	22.4 (72.3)	22.7 (72.9)	23.6 (74.5)	25.0 (77.0)	26.0 (78.8)	29.4 (84.9)	31.0 (87.8)	31.5 (88.7)	30.6 (87.1)	28.5 (83.3)	27.5 (81.5)	22.9 (73.2)	31.5 (88.7)
Mean daily maximum °C (°F)	17.5 (63.5)	17.3 (63.1)	17.7 (63.9)	18.5 (65.3)	20.0 (68.0)	22.4 (72.3)	24.8 (76.6)	26.0 (78.8)	24.7 (76.5)	22.3 (72.1)	19.4 (66.9)	17.9 (64.2)	20.7 (69.3)
Daily mean °C (°F)	15.3 (59.5)	14.8 (58.6)	15.0 (59.0)	15.8 (60.4)	17.3 (63.1)	19.6 (67.3)	22.0 (71.6)	22.8 (73.0)	21.8 (71.2)	19.4 (66.9)	17.2 (63.0)	15.7 (60.3)	18.1 (64.5)
Mean daily minimum °C (°F)	12.9 (55.2)	12.1 (53.8)	12.4 (54.3)	13.1 (55.6)	14.5 (58.1)	16.5 (61.7)	18.9 (66.0)	19.7 (67.5)	19.1 (66.4)	16.9 (62.4)	14.8 (58.6)	13.3 (55.9)	15.4 (59.6)
Record low °C (°F)	5.0 (41.0)	4.4 (39.9)	4.6 (40.3)	5.6 (42.1)	7.2 (45.0)	8.9 (48.0)	12.1 (53.8)	10.6 (51.1)	11.1 (52.0)	6.7 (44.1)	6.4 (43.5)	4.0 (39.2)	4.0 (39.2)
Average precipitation mm (inches)	123.8 (4.87)	176.7 (6.96)	142.3 (5.60)	91.6 (3.61)	98.5 (3.88)	59.8 (2.35)	40.9 (1.61)	74.2 (2.92)	104.0 (4.09)	166.4 (6.55)	174.5 (6.87)	217.9 (8.58)	1,470.6 (57.89)
Average precipitation days (≥ 1.0 mm)	15.89	15.50	15.07	12.57	11.54	9.18	7.31	10.89	12.83	16.07	16.91	17.62	161.38
Mean monthly sunshine hours	83.2	131.1	167.2	173.1	197.6	177.9	212.2	204.5	190.7	153.0	112.5	92.9	1,895.9
Source 1: Météo Climat 1991-2020 "Moyennes 1991/2020 Portugal (LAJES)". Baseline climate means (1991–2020) from stations all over the world. Météo Climat.
Source 2: Météo Climat 1949-present "Extremes for Lajes". Météo Climat. Source 3: Infoclimat

== Economy ==
Owing to the significance and importance of the regional air field, the economy of Lajes has a symbiotic relationship with the activities at Air Base No.4. Most of the auxiliary staff at the base are residents of Lajes, and many services in the parish support the international demands of the stationed personal. Although most services are provided on base for servicemen, there are still trickle-down affects to the local community, with support personnel living in the parish and spending their money in the local economy. At the same time, it is common for foreign servicemen to support the local economy, when not on duty.

Local activities include carpentry shops, services directed to farmers, automobile and mechanical garages, video, graphic and promotional services and financial institutions, including branches of the national and regional banks (Montepio, Banif, etc.). In addition, several shops, mini-markets, fruit stands and groceries service the local residents with bakeries, a butcher shop, and hairstylists.

== Architecture ==
Lajes has several elementary schools with the main one located in Aldeia Nova. It has two churches with the main one dating back to the 16th century. This church has been destroyed by earthquakes in 1614 and 1841 and partially destroyed in the 1 January 1980 earthquake. The other smaller church is located in Cabouco.

=== Civic ===
- Fountain of Ribeira da Areia (Portuguese: Chafarizes da Ribeira da Areia)
- Fountain of Malícias (Chafarizes das Malícias)
- Fountain of Largo de S. João (Chafariz do Largo de S. João)
- Fountain of Remédios (Chafariz dos Remédios)
- Fountain of the Cruzeiro (Chafariz do Cruzeiro)
- Fountain of Picão (Chafariz do Picão)
- Washhouse of Ribeira dos Pães (Pias de levar da Ribeira dos Pães)
- Fountain of the Caldeira (Fonte da Caldeira)

=== Religious ===
- Church of the Archangel Michael (Igreja de São Miguel Arcanjo)
- Hermitage of Our Lady of Remedies (Ermida de Nossa Senhora dos Remédios)
- Hermitage of the Immaculate Heart of Mary (Ermida do Imaculado Coração de Maria)
- Liturgical Centre of the Serra de Santiago (Centro de culto da Serra de Santiago)
