= Fort of the Espírito Santo =

Remains of a Portuguese fortification

Fort of Espírito Santo
- Forte de Espírito Santo
- Terceira, Central, name=Azores in Portugal

Site information
- Type: Fort
- Owner: Portuguese Republic
- Operator: Santa Cruz
- Open to the public: Public

Location
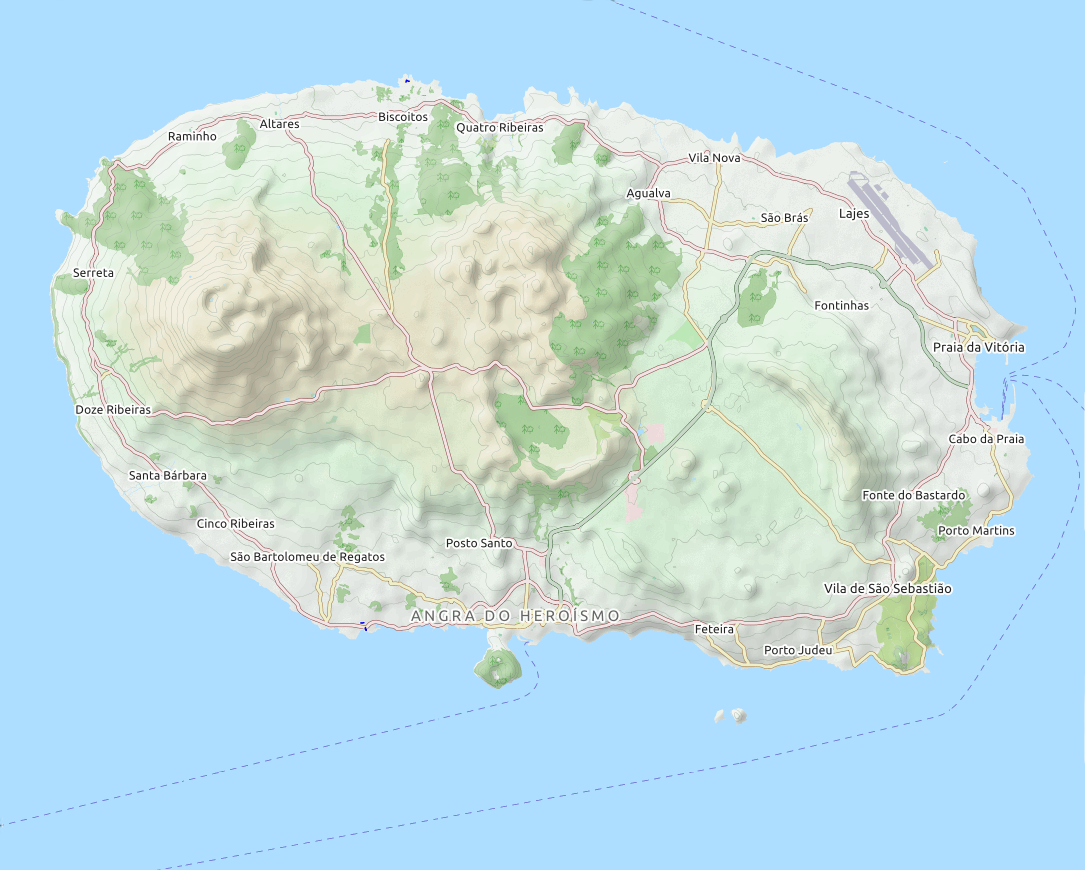
- Location of the fort within the municipality of Praia da Vitória
- Coordinates: 38°43′52.97″N 27°3′1.25″W

Site history
- Built: 16th century
- Materials: Basalt

The Fort of the Espírito Santo (Portuguese: Forte do Espírito Santo (literally, the Fort of the Holy Spirit)) is the remains of a 16th-century fortification located on the extreme northern edge of the Bay of Praia da Vitória, in the Portuguese civil parish of Santa Cruz, municipality of Praia da Vitória, on the island of Terceira, in the Azores.

Positioned along the point of Facho, in a commanding position over the coastal stretch, it served as a fortification for the defense of the anchorage of Praia. This defensive structure was crucial in protecting against attacks by pirates and corsairs who frequently traversed the waters of the mid-Atlantic, targeting ships returning from the newly discovered territories of the Far East. It crossed its cannons with the Fort of Nossa Senhora da Conceição and the Fort of the Port, that existed across the bay. Today, the ruins of the small fort is part of the protective northern pier that shelters shipping and refuelling ships supporting the Lajes Air Field.

== History ==
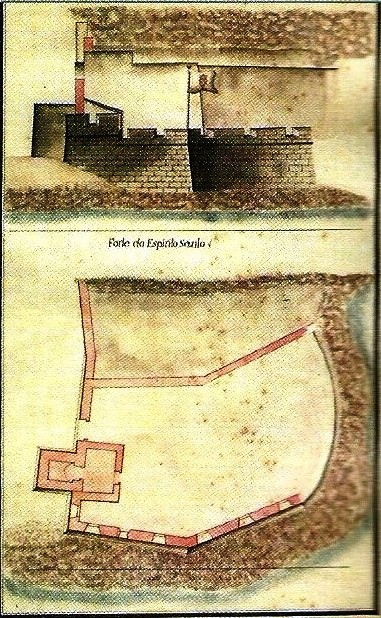
Anonymous drawing of the Fort of Espírito Santo (in the Arquivo Histórico Militar)

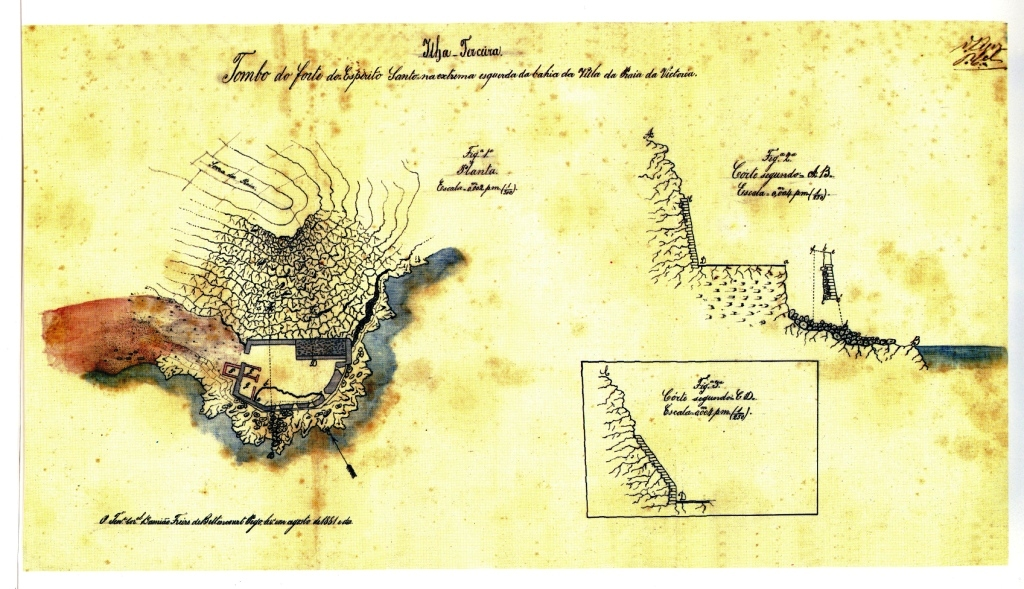
Plan of the Fort of Espírito Santo (Damião Pego, August 1881)

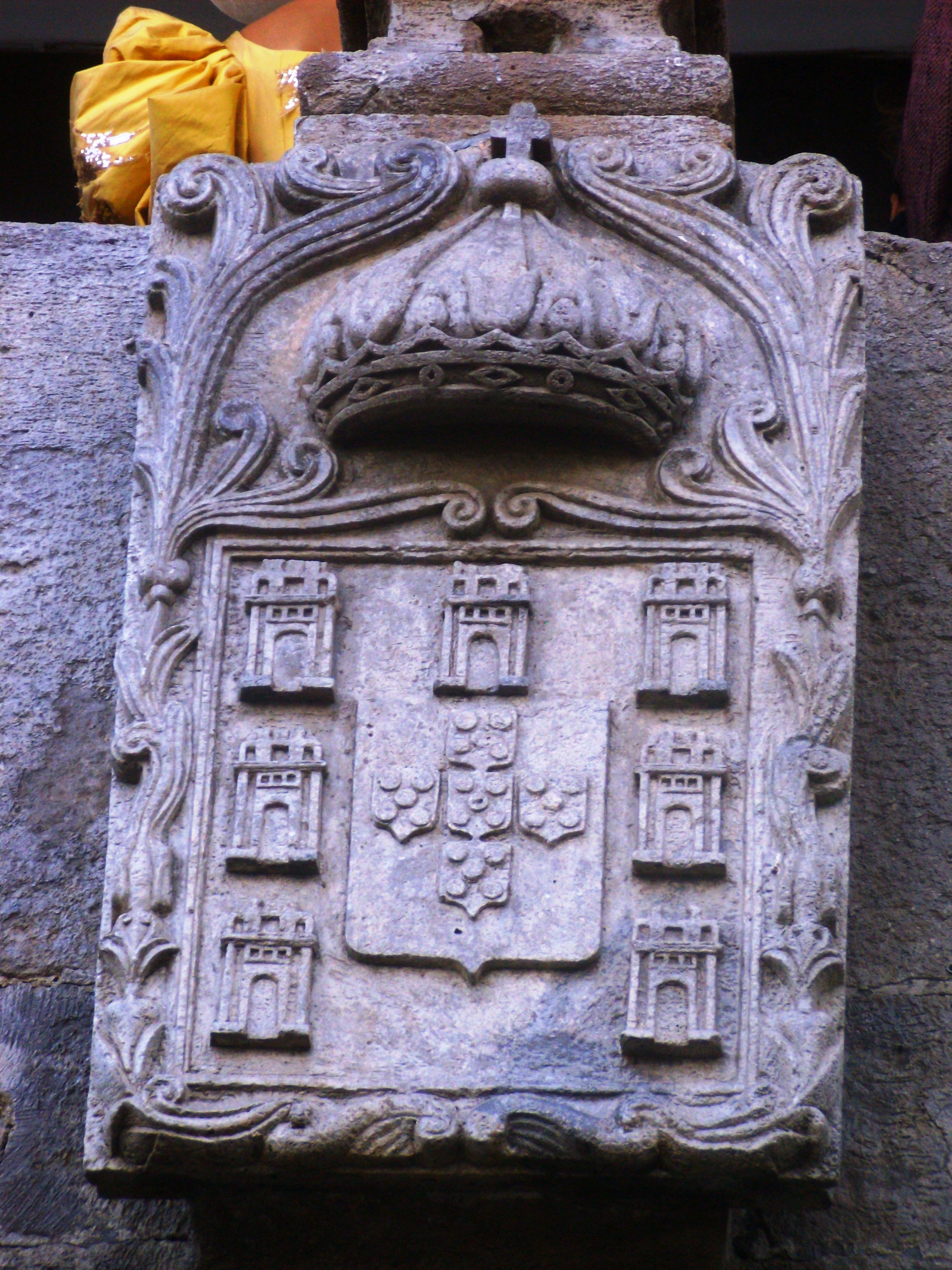
Unproven tradition suggests that the council hall coat-of-arms originated from the Fort of Espirito Santo after the fort was destroyed and abandoned

The fort was erected in 1576 by the Corregedor of the Azores, Ciprião de Figueiredo e Vasconcelos, from defensive plans first elaborated by Tommaso Benedetto.

During the War of Spanish Succession (1702–1714) it was called "The Fortress of the Holy Spirit on the Point of Facho", in the report "Fortificações nos Açores existentes em 1710".

Father António Cordeiro, writing in 1717, indicated that the fort included eleven iron and bronze artillery-pieces.

With the establishment of the Captaincy-General of the Azores, the fort was referred in the following terms:

"29 - Fort of Holy Spirit. Reformed anew, needs its gate repaired; it has ten cannon emplacements and seven good iron pieces, and its repairs necessary, requires another three pieces with its repairs and stave ten gunners and forty assistants. This fort and that of Santa Catarina are those which defend the entrance of the town in the bay of Praia."

In the reports of Manoel Correa Branco (1776), the fort is "...the last situated in the bay, and the main one defending [the bay] crossing fire with the many forts that defend the bay", noting the need for its repairs, including grout in the guardhouse, garrison cots, the wooden ceiling, and the roof of the small house that served as a powder magazine, which lacks door and stored the artillery during the winter. At this time, the fort had an irregular polygonal plan, with the walls protected by six cannon emplacements towards the sea and one towards the town.

The 1805 plan of the town of Praia also includes the design of the Fort at that time. Twenty years later (around 1822), Sousa (1995) records that the port of Praia was "...tolerably defended by the fort...of the Holy Spirit. A Regiment of National Militia, taking the name of the village, is its defence."

Later, during the context of the Liberal Wars, the fort was fired upon by a squadron of Absolutist ships, during a battle on 11 August 1829. At the time, the fort was garrison by eight artillerymen and four auxiliaries, under the command of ensign Manoel Franco, supporting only two cannon. Under continuous enemy artillery bombardment, it was the only fort silenced during the battle; the fort was damaged by rocks falling from the clifftop in the bombardment, which damaged the structures, forcing the soldiers to abandon the fort. When forces loyal to Miguel I of Portugal (1828–1834) made landfall between the Fort of the Port and Fort of the Espírito Santo, they were impeded from advancing by a small Liberal contingent. These forces, therefore, converged towards the fort, beginning their invasion from that site, occupied the terraplan with 400 soldiers. These men then attempted to scale the escarpment in order to take a position that was dominant over the cliffs along the Serra de São Tiago, but were repelled and massacred by Liberal forces as they tried to take the semaphore station located on its summit.

The report of Field Marshal Barão de Bastos in 1862 informed:

"The walls facing the sea and the cannon emplacements require some repair, the lodging includes little more than walls that can be reused; I believe its budget has been approved, but not placed in execution, due to a lack of pecuniary means."

Yet, by 1881, the structure was already in ruins, the stones from the walls were sold systematically for the construction of other buildings.

In the 20th century, between the 1950s and 1960s, the construction of the northern protective pier by American military forces in order to help shelter offloading, resulted in further investigation of the fort's ruins. A compromise was signed between the Americans and Portuguese to permit the construction of the dock, while reconstructing the old fort. Yet, unable to fulfill this compromise, the remains of the fort was used to support the arriba at the end of the bay, between Chagas and Ribeira de Beljardim, sometime during the 1960s. Little remains of the vestiges except some portions of the rock used in the walls. The ruins are neither classified or protected by the national or regional registry, nor included in the tourist itineraries published by the city. Local tradition suggest that the royal coat-of-arms from the fort was used in the construction of the municipal council hall of Praia, although unproven.

== Architecture ==
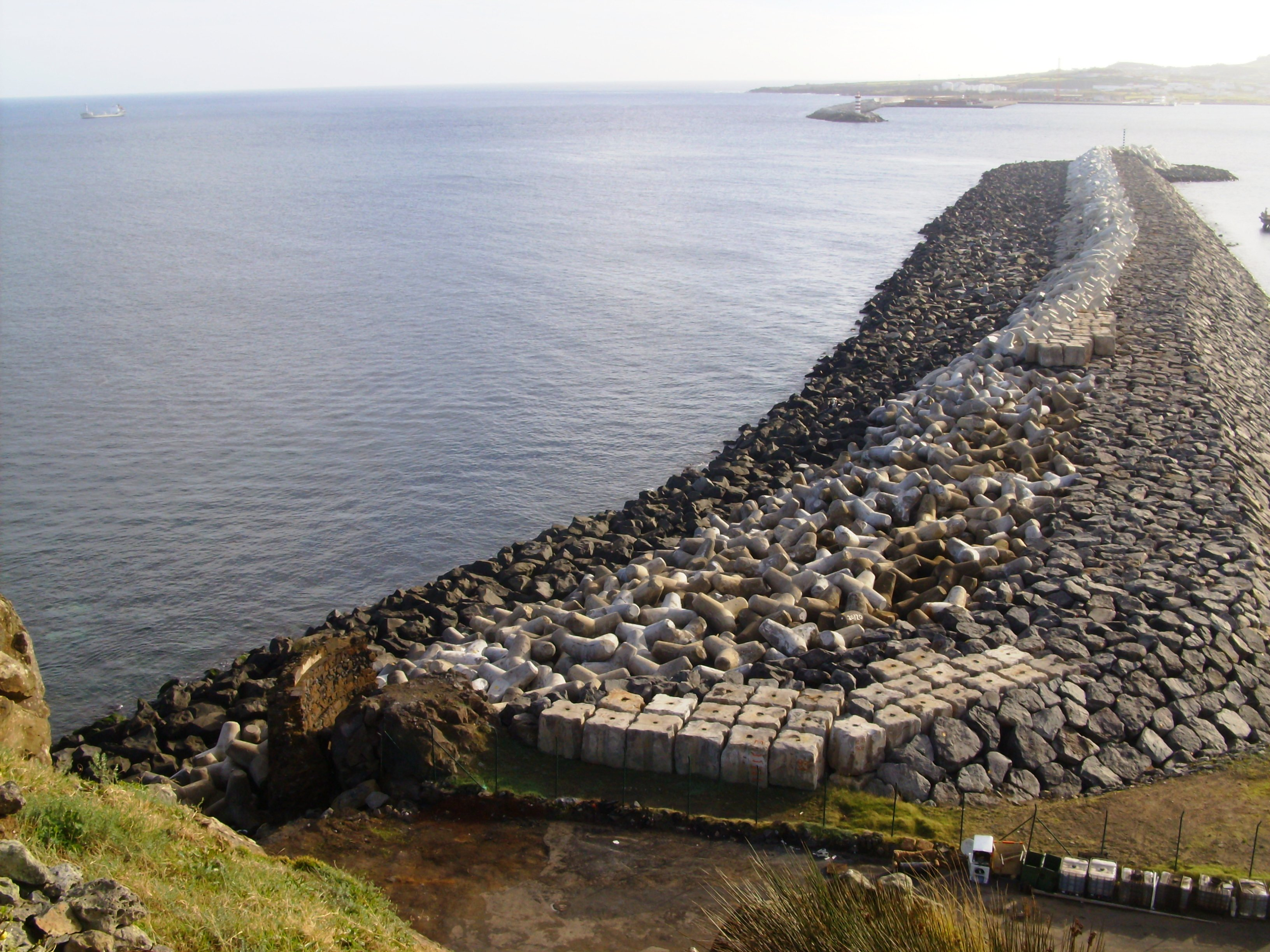
A panoramic view of the remaining portion of the fort's wall

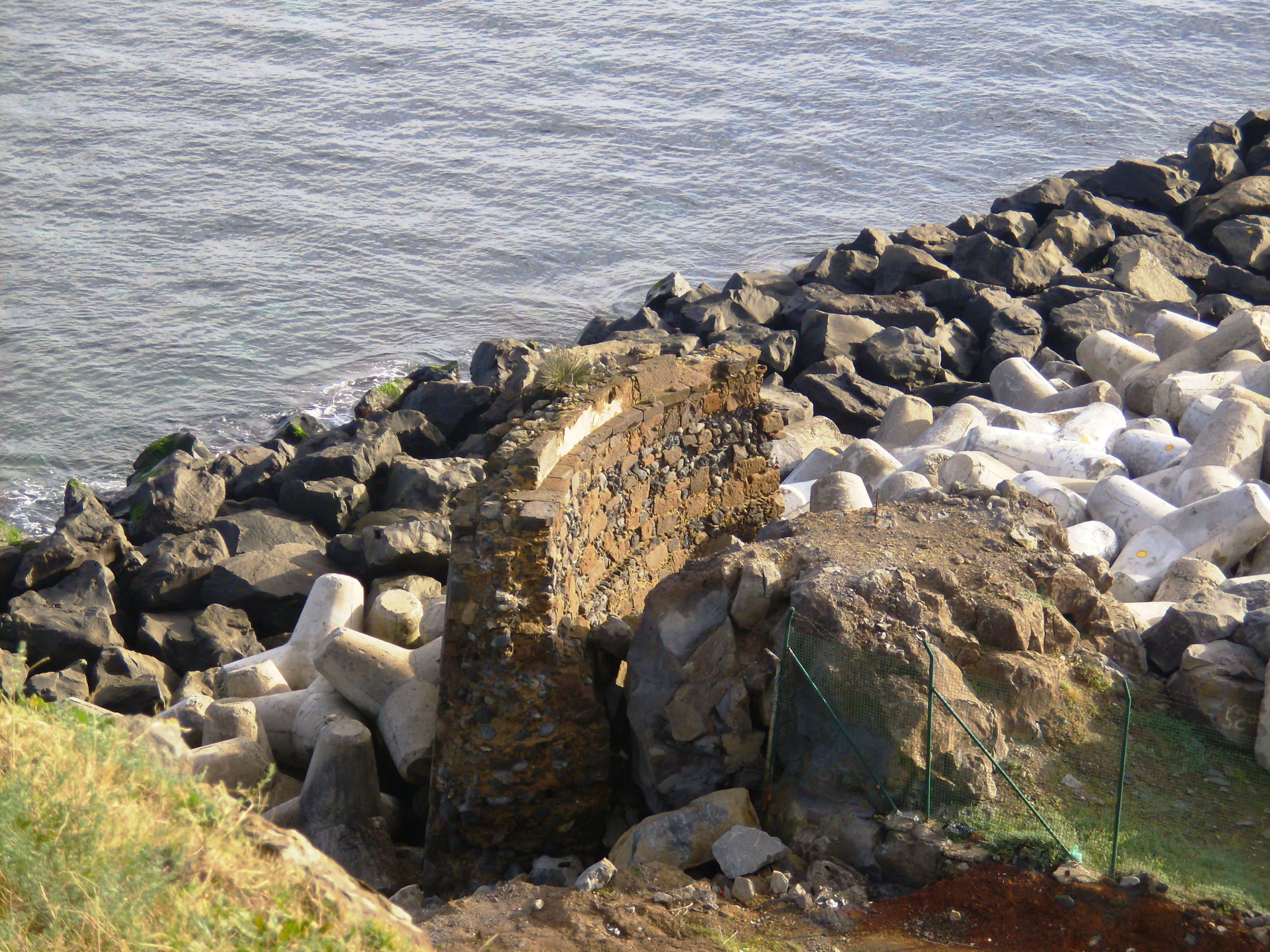
A detail of the wall; little remains of the main structure, although detail of mortar and stone are visible

A bastion-type defensive position, the fort had polygonal shape and was implanted into the cliff of Facho, adapting into the relief on which it was built. A structure of mortar and natural basalt stone, the fort covered an area of 500 square metres (5,400 ft^{2}).

Originally with a capacity for seven pieces of artillery, by 1881, the structure only supported a battery of five cannons. The terraplane included a guardhouse (with two volumes) and in addition to a powder magazine, which anchored the western wall. Access to the fort was made from the beach.
