= Battle of Praia da Vitória =

1829 battle of the Liberal Wars

Battle of Praia Bay
- Part of Liberal Wars
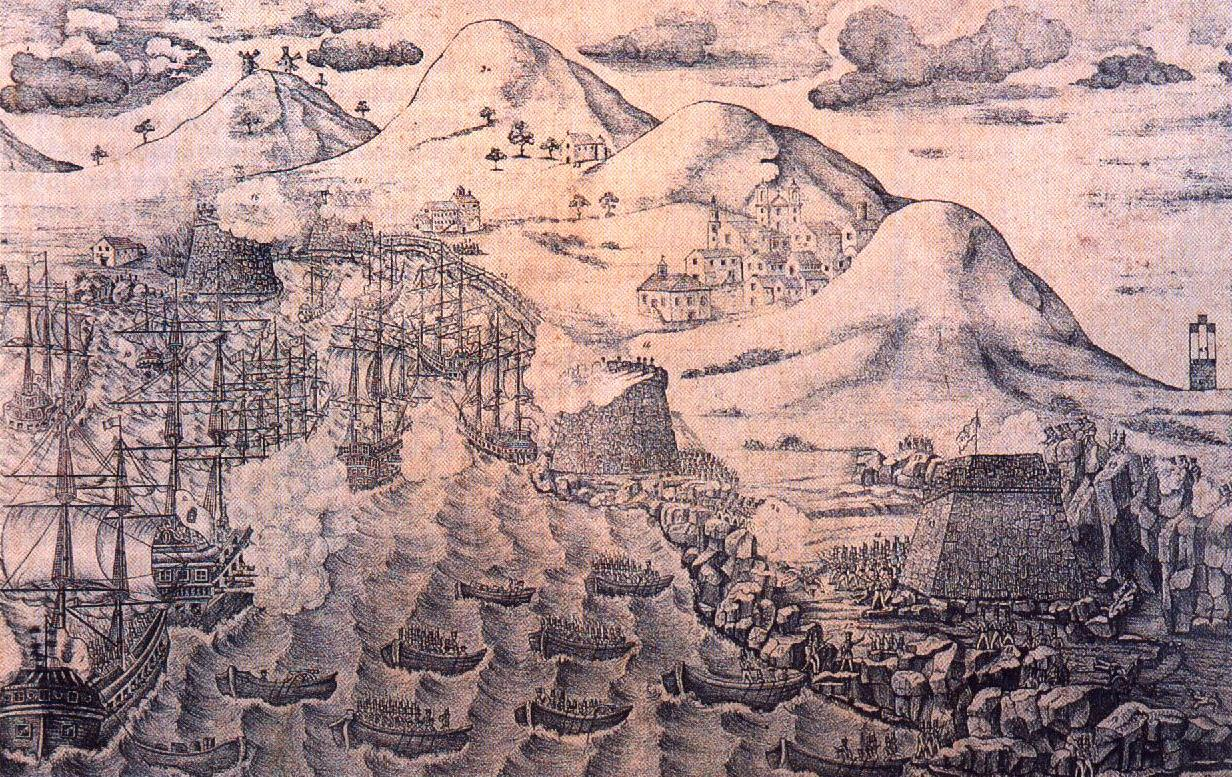
Date	11 August 1829
Location	Praia Bay, Terceira island, Azores
Result	Liberal victory

Belligerents
Liberals	Miguelites

Commanders and leaders
Duke of Terceira	José António Azevedo e Lemos

The Battle of Praia Bay was fought by the coast of Terceira Island on August 11, 1829, between Portuguese liberals and a Miguelite fleet as part of the Portuguese civil war.

The Miguelites under command of José António Azevedo e Lemos attempted to disembark troops on Terceira island, but were defeated by the liberal troops under command of the Duke of Terceira who controlled a dozen small forts and artillery batteries along five kilometers of the coast. The defeat of the miguelites in this battle was decisive for the affirmation and posterior victory of the liberal ideas in Portugal.

After the war, the municipality of Praia was renamed as Praia da Vitória.
