= Praia da Vitória =

- Municipality
- Very Notable City of Praia da Vitória
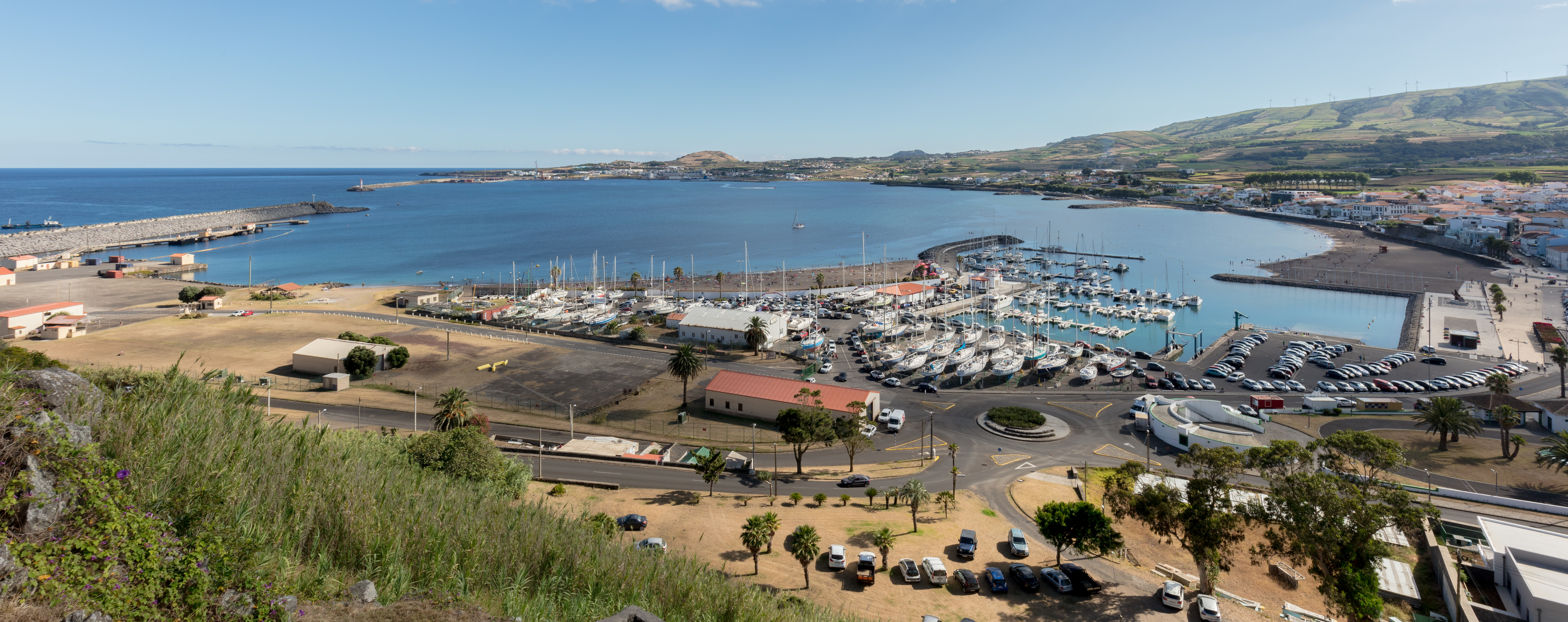
- View of Praia da Vitória from the outlook of Facho.

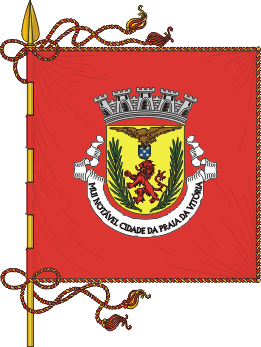
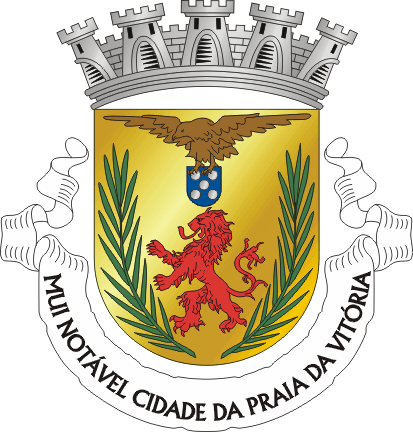
- Flag Coat of arms
- Interactive map of Praia da Vitória
- Coordinates: 38°44′0″N 27°3′59″W
- Country: Portugal
- Auton. region: Azores
- Island: Terceira
- Established: Settlement: fl. 1400; Municipality: c. 1480
- Parishes: 11

Government
  - President: Tibério Dinis

Area
  - Total: 161.27 km^{2} (62.27 sq mi)
- Elevation: 27 m (89 ft)

Population (2011)
  - Total: 21,035
  - Density: 130.43/km^{2} (337.82/sq mi)
- Time zone: UTC−01:00 (AZOT)
  - Summer (DST): UTC+00:00 (AZOST)
- Postal code: 9760-851
- Area code: 292
- Patron: Santa Cruz
- Local holiday: 11 August
- Website: http://www.cmpv.pt

Praia da Vitória, (Note: Portuguese: Beach of Victory) (Note: Portuguese pronunciation: [ˈpɾajɐ ðɐ viˈtɔɾi.ɐ]) officially the Very Notable City of Praia da Vitória, is a municipality in the Portuguese archipelago of the Azores. With a population of 21,035 (in 2011), the second largest administrative authority on the island of Terceira, it covers an area of 162.29 square kilometres (62.66 mi^{2}), that extends from the northern coast halfway into the interior.

== History ==
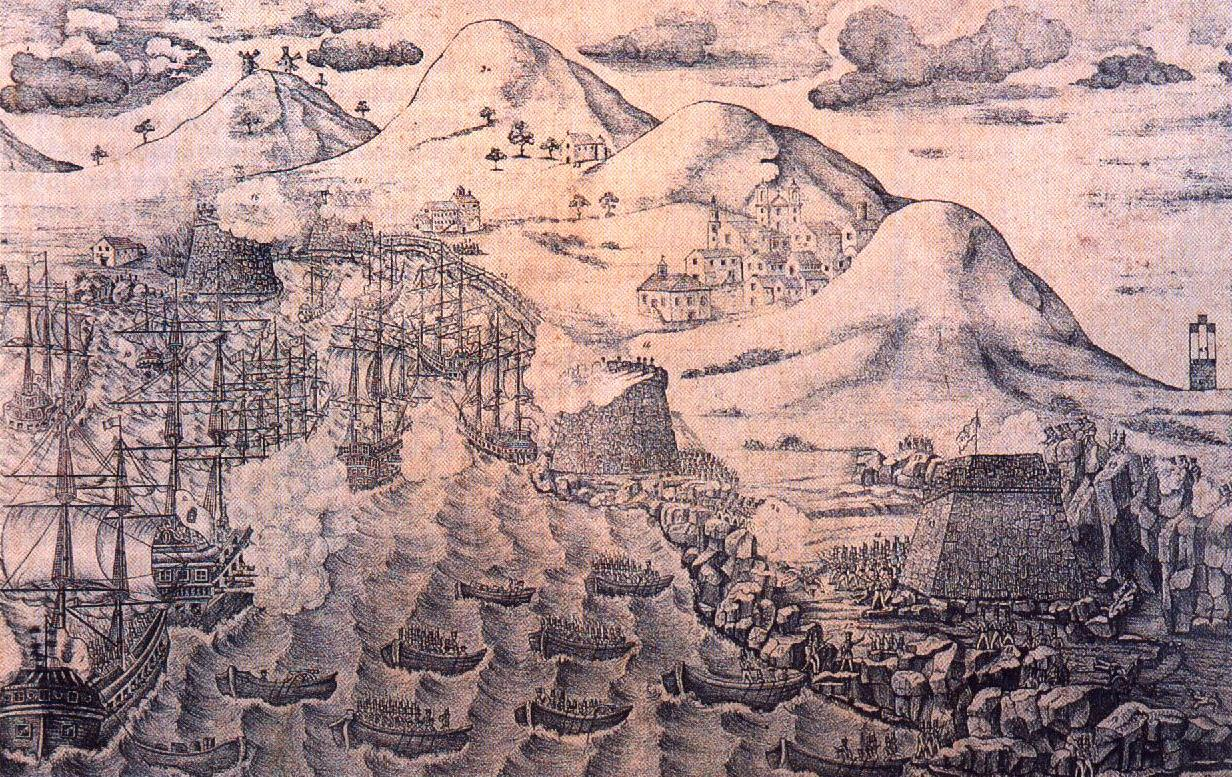
Engraving from the Batalha da baía da Praia (Battle of the Bay of Praia)

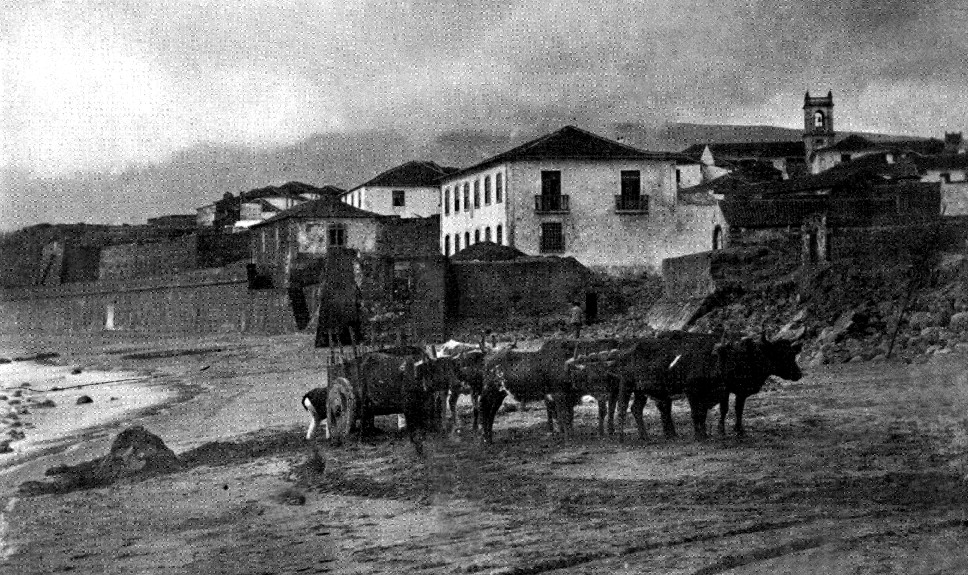
Camponeses transporting sand from the beaches for building purposes

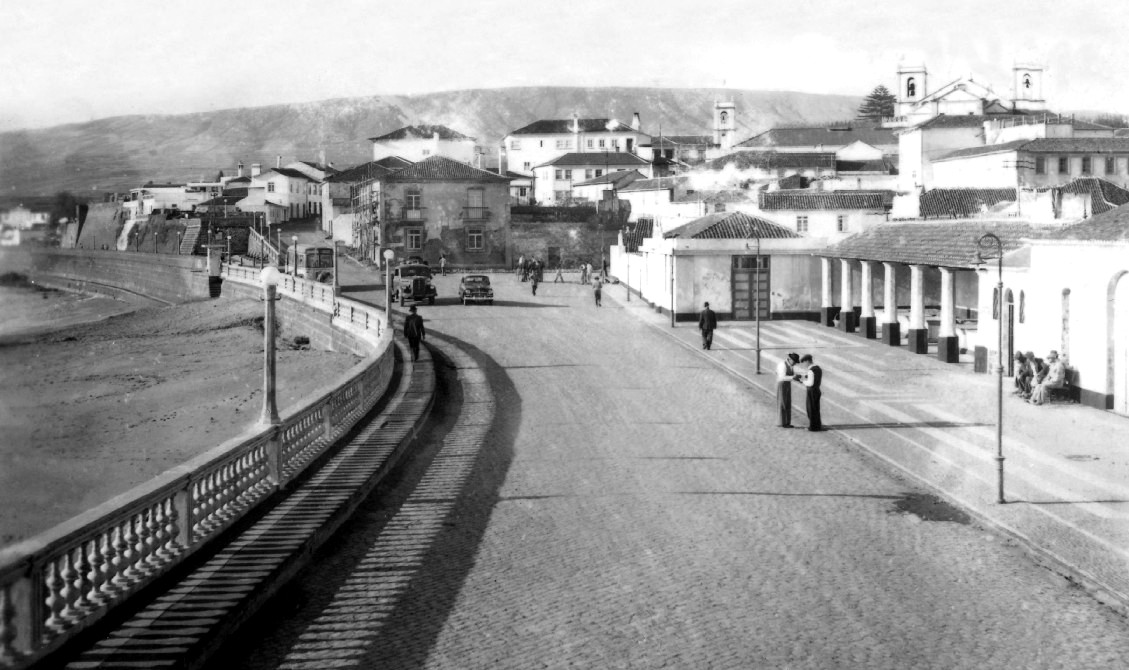
A view of the main strip in Praia da Vitória during the middle of the 20th century

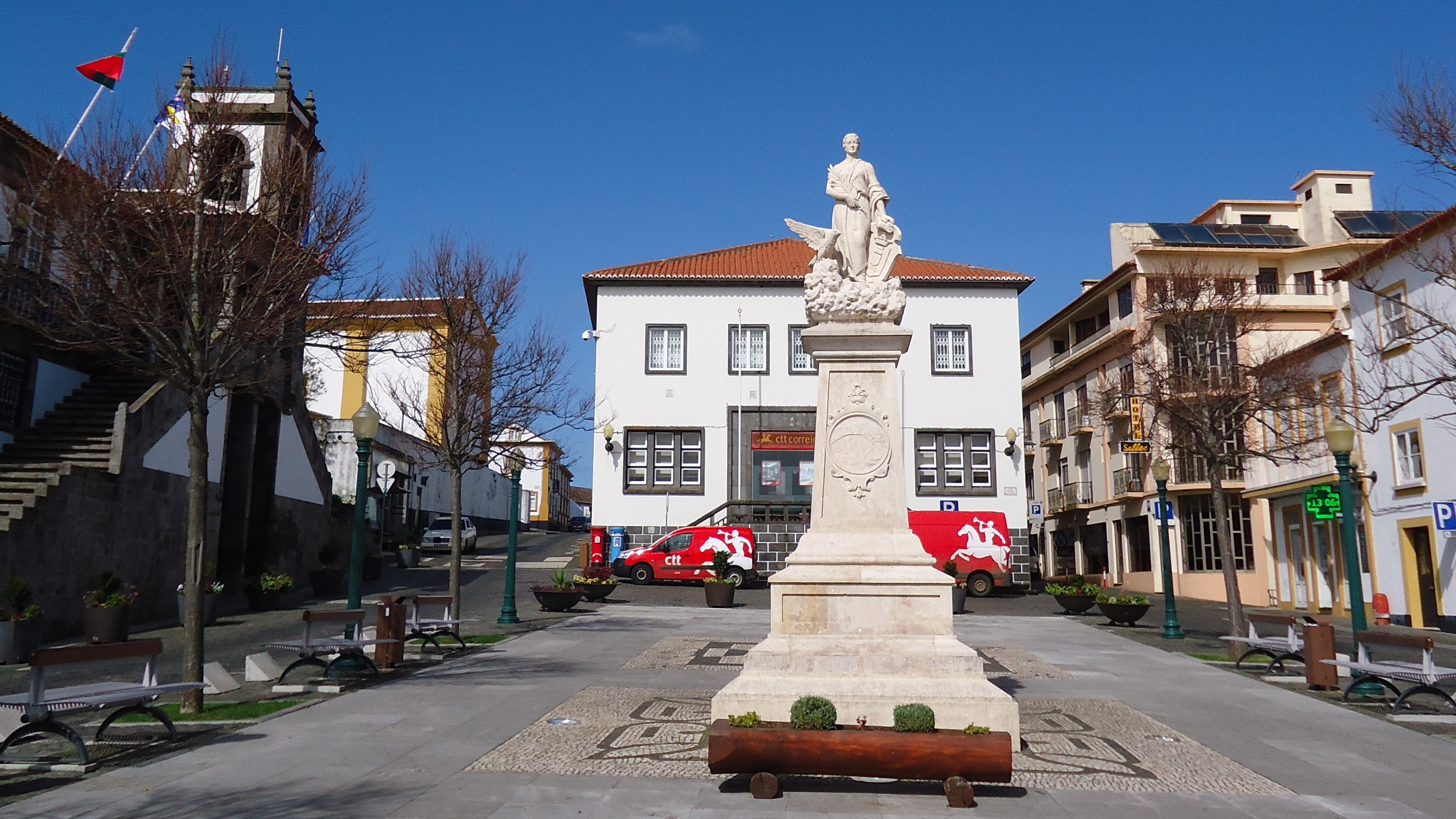
Main square

The area of Praia, was one of the first points colonized on the island of Terceira. Praia constituted the seat of the Donatary-Captaincy of Terceira between 1456 and 1474; the island's first Captain, Jácome de Bruges along with his first lieutenant, Diogo de Teive, established their residency at this site. By 1474, the island was divided into two captaincies (Praia and Angra): the Captaincy of Praia reverted to Álvaro Martins Homem, Bruges' successor. The growth of the woad industry and export wheat market concentrated along the fertile Ramo Grande area, allowed Praia to grow rapidly. Consequently, Praia was elevated to the status of vila (comparable to town) in 1480 (then still within the administration of Álvaro Martins Homem).

By the last quarter of the 16th century, Gaspar Frutuoso (the celebrated Azorean historian), wrote of Praia in these terms:

...and shortly there is the town of Praia, noble and sumptuous and with good buildings, built in a very good style, circled by a good wall, with its forts and bulwarks all around, populated by nobles and older residents, with one of the older settlements of the island, circled by famous and rich farms of nobles and grandiose nobility, with a parish and sumptuous church of three naves, with a vaulted main chapel and porticoes and pillars of well worked marble, all circled by chapels of the grand first-born...its principal invocation is to the Holy Cross...where the house of Mercy and hospital, with two churches, one the hospital of the Holy Spirit and the other to Our Lady, with a nave down the middle...; it's a famous monastery of Saint Francis where there still continue to reside ten or twelve religious, where there are many chapels of the grand first-born similar to the above indicated; three monasteries for nuns, the more principal of the those is to Jesus..., with forty nuns with black veils and two, one of Our Lady of the Light and the other Our Lady of the Stigmata, give obedience and observation to Saint Francis, where there are few religious

During the Iberian Union, King Philip II of Spain ordered an armada to Terceira to impose the governorship of Ambrósio de Aguiar Coutinho on his unruly subjects in the Azores and facilitate shipping to the Indies. Under the command of Pedro de Valdez, the fleet arrived in Santa Maria with seven large carracks and 1000 troops, took on provisions and sailed for São Miguel in the spring (where Governor Ambrósio de Aguiar Coutinho and his cousin supplied the group). After an initial assault on Angra, Valdez rushed to assault the island, disembarking troops at the Casa da Salga, in the valley of Porto Judeu (a mile from Vila de São Sebastião), incensed that King Phillip was sending a larger contingent to capture Terceira. The Battle of Salga became an important event in the village of São Sebastião (then a parish of Praia) broke out along the coast in 1582.

During the Restoration of Portuguese Independence, the citizenry of Praia acclaimed King John IV, when Francisco Ornelas da Câmara arrived in Terceira.

The settlement was destroyed during the 1614 Caída da Praia earthquake, with many of the residents along the coast lost to the sea. Along the 17th century, even as the community was being re-constructed, there were several seismic aftershocks.

During the Liberal Wars, the harbour was the scene of a naval battle (in 1829) between the Liberals and the Absolutists, competing factions in support of King Pedro IV and King Miguel, respectively, during the Liberal Wars. The Battle of Praia ensued when a squadron of Miguelist troops attempted to disembark at Praia (11 August 1829). As a result of this victory, Queen Maria II after being restored to the throne, acted to recognize its residents for their heroism by appending "Mui Notável" (Very notable) and "da Vitória" (of the Victoria) to its name (12 January 1837): it was at this time that Praia became known as Praia da Vitória.

Its importance in the economy of the north continued, even after the second Caída da Praia earthquake (on 15 June 1841), that partially destroyed the settlement. Its reconstruction, at the end of the 19th century was motivated by councillor José Silvestre Ribeiro. As priest Jerónimo Emiliano de Andrade (who lived in the town at the time), referred to Praia da Vitória:

The traveller who leaves Cabo da Praia is quickly encounters the magnificent and majestic Vila da Praia da Vitória, which is located a short distance, no less than a quarter league ...

The town was elevated to city on 20 June 1981, although it continued to be referred to as the Vila da Praia da Vitória (until 1983). In the second half of the 20th century, a large aerodrome was constructed along the southwestern side of the Portuguese Air Base No.4. In addition, the port of Praia was expanded to include a 1400-metre extension. These two projects have supported the municipality's growth, along with its large industrial centre.

The United States Army's presence in the Azores began in 1952 with the arrival of the 501st Transportation Battalion. The 501st set up operations and established the military port of Praia da Vitoria. At one point, Military Traffic Management Command employed a combined workforce of over 200 military and civilian employees. The 501st eventually became the 1324th Medium Port Command which was redesignated the 952d Transportation Co. in October 1997.

In 2000, the 952nd Transport Company was redesignated the Azores Detachment and switched over to totally civilian staffing.

== Geography ==
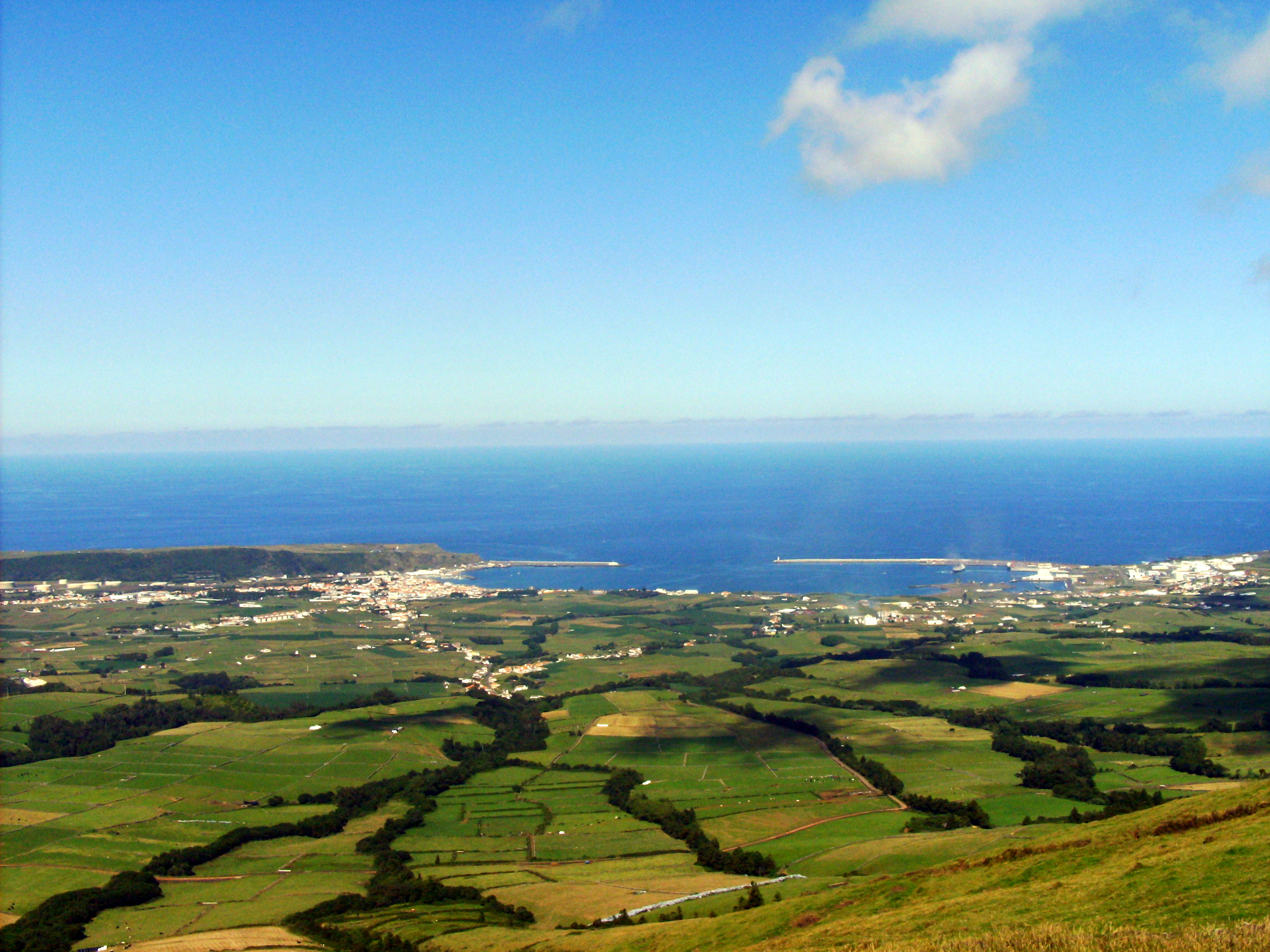
A view of the municipality of Praia da Vitória

Praia da Vitória occupies the northern and eastern coasts of Terceira, bisecting it from northwest to southeast, through a varied geomorphology.

Administratively, the municipality of Praia da Vitória is divided into the following civil parishes, which handle local distribution of services and support the local residents:

- Agualva
- Biscoitos
- Cabo da Praia
- Fonte do Bastardo
- Fontinhas
- Lajes
- Porto Martins
- Santa Cruz
- Quatro Ribeiras
- São Brás
- Vila Nova

The urban centre, that includes the parishes of Lajes and Santa Cruz, fronts a ridge known as Facho that overlooks the airport of Lajes. It was used as a lookout for pirates and invaders, and later as marine military semaphore station and primitive lighthouse (lasting for 400 years). Apart from pasture-lands, the ridge was occupied by marine/naval housing and support buildings for Portuguese Air Base 4. At the far end is a monument dedicated to the Sacred Heart of Mary and lookout.

== Economy ==
Praia da Vitória is a services, fishing and agricultural municipality and boasts a large marina, popular with the yachting community, with the only sizeable sand beach on Terceira.

Lajes Air Base, a joint United States and Portuguese air force base, lies three kilometers to the north of the town. American servicemen frequent the restaurants and clubs in the town and add considerably to the local economy.

== Architecture ==
The town boasts two notable churches, several public squares, and a number of hotels and restaurants.

=== Civic ===
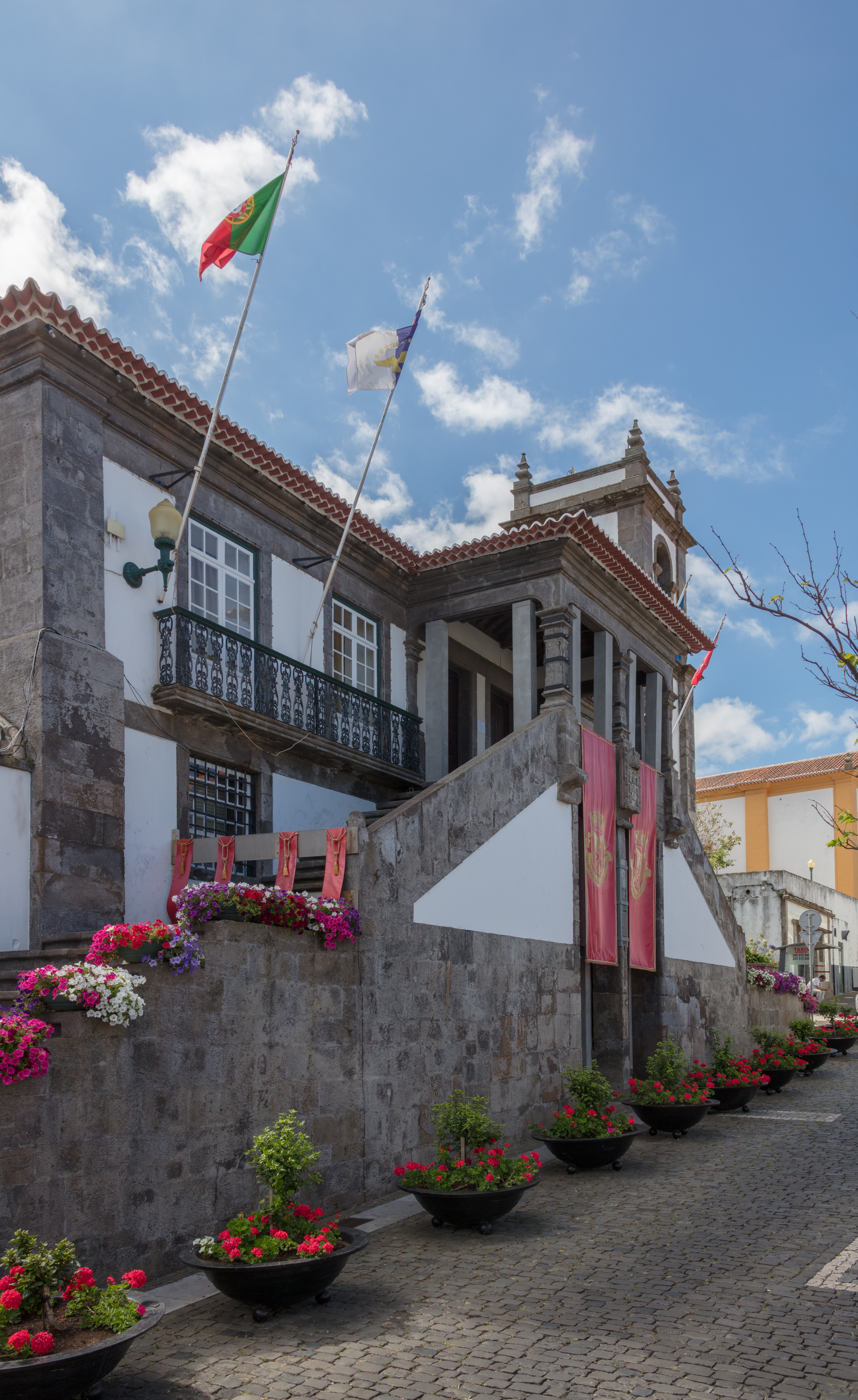
The heritage and municipal council building constructed during the Captaincy of Praia da Vitória

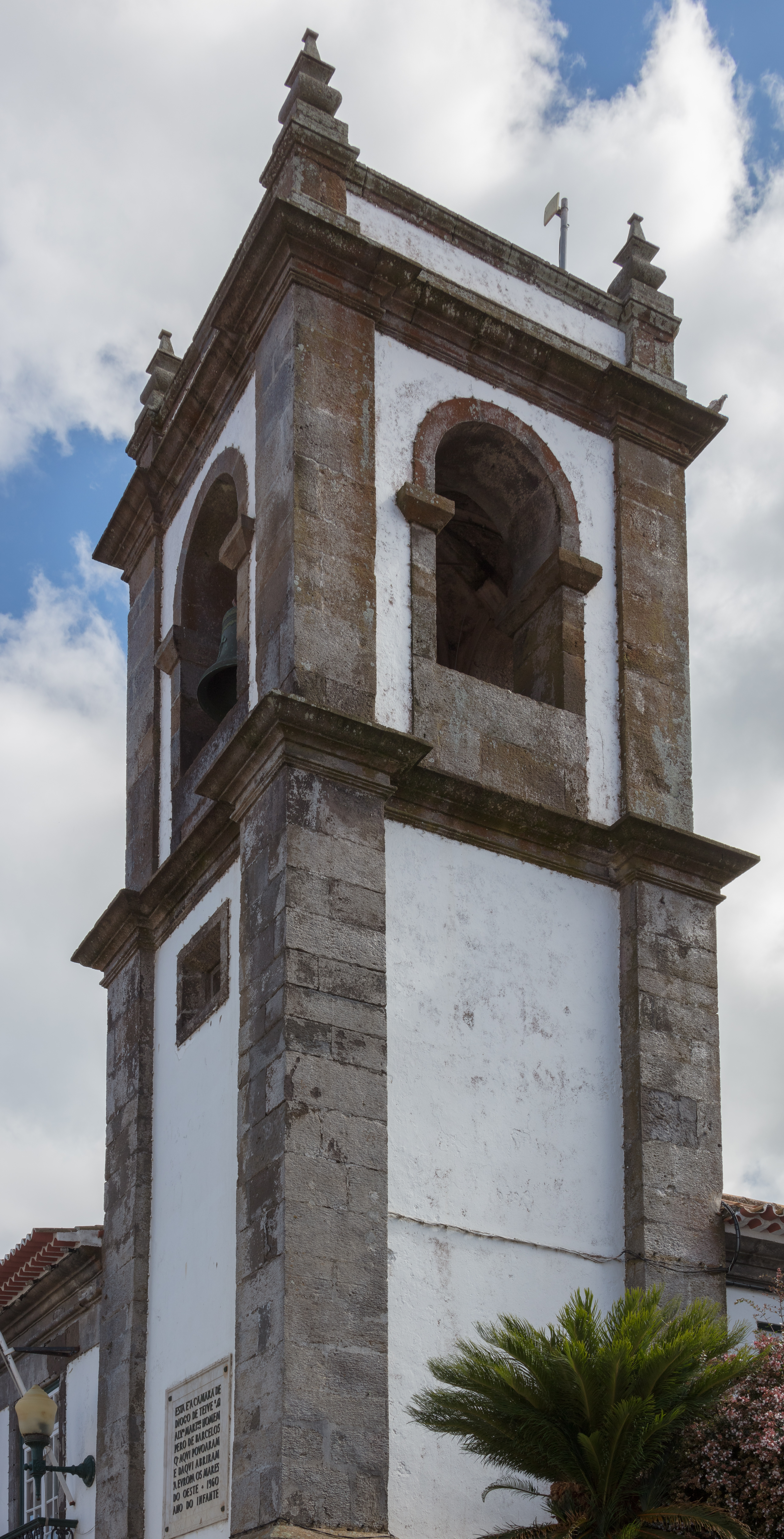
Tower of the municipal council building

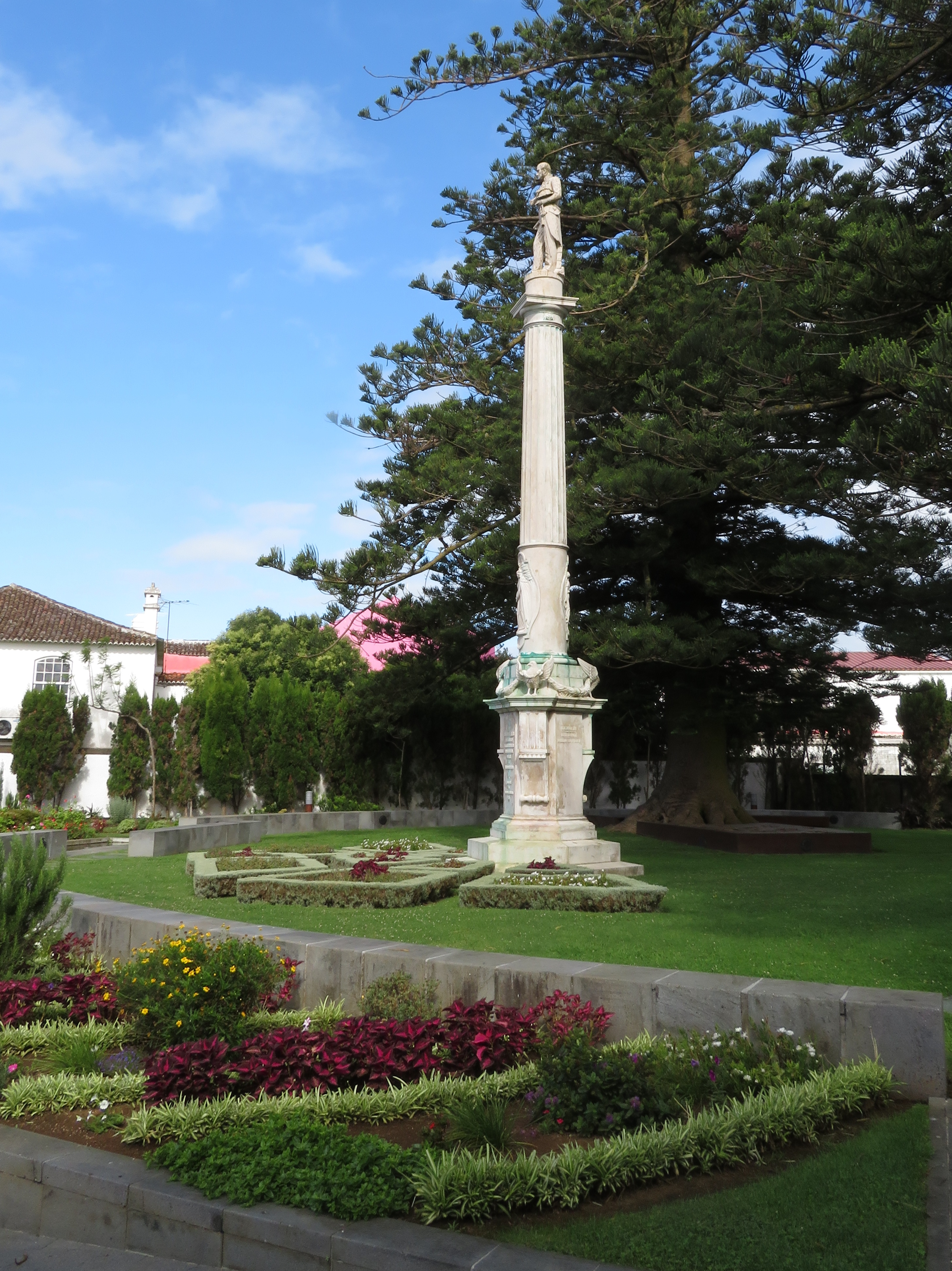
Public park Jardim municipal

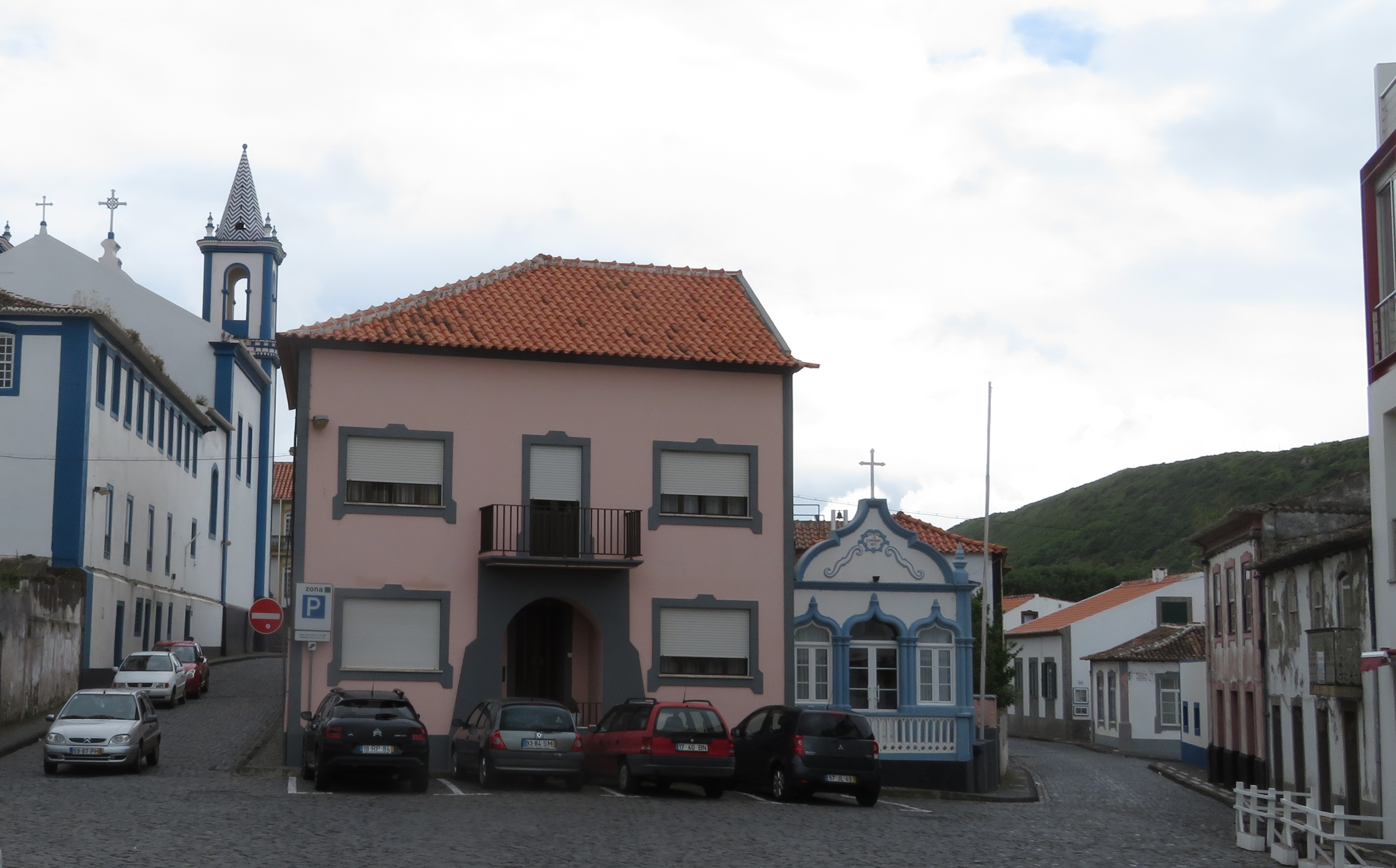
Largo José S. Ribeiro square with Império dos Marítimos chapel

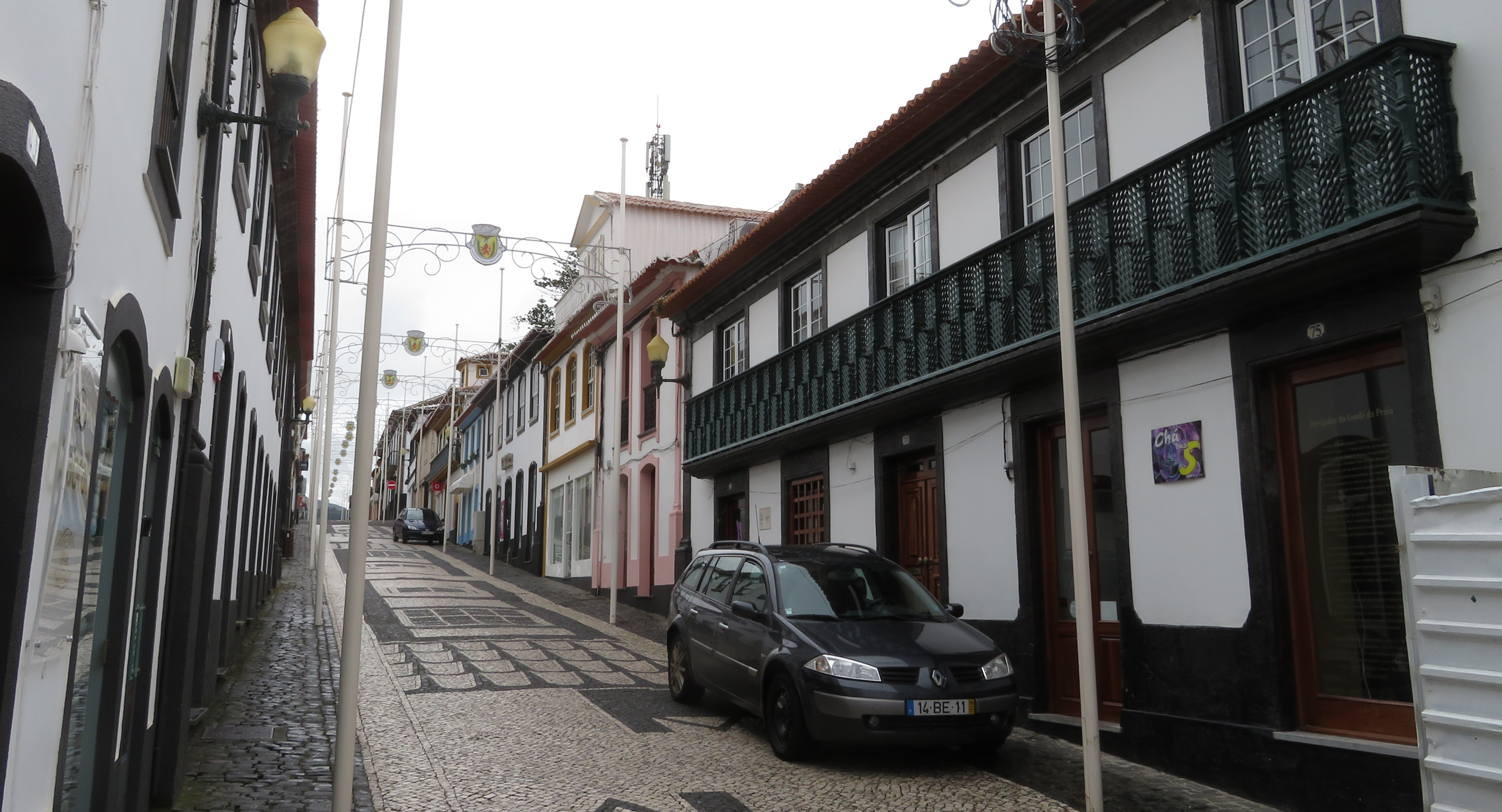
Main street Rua Jesus

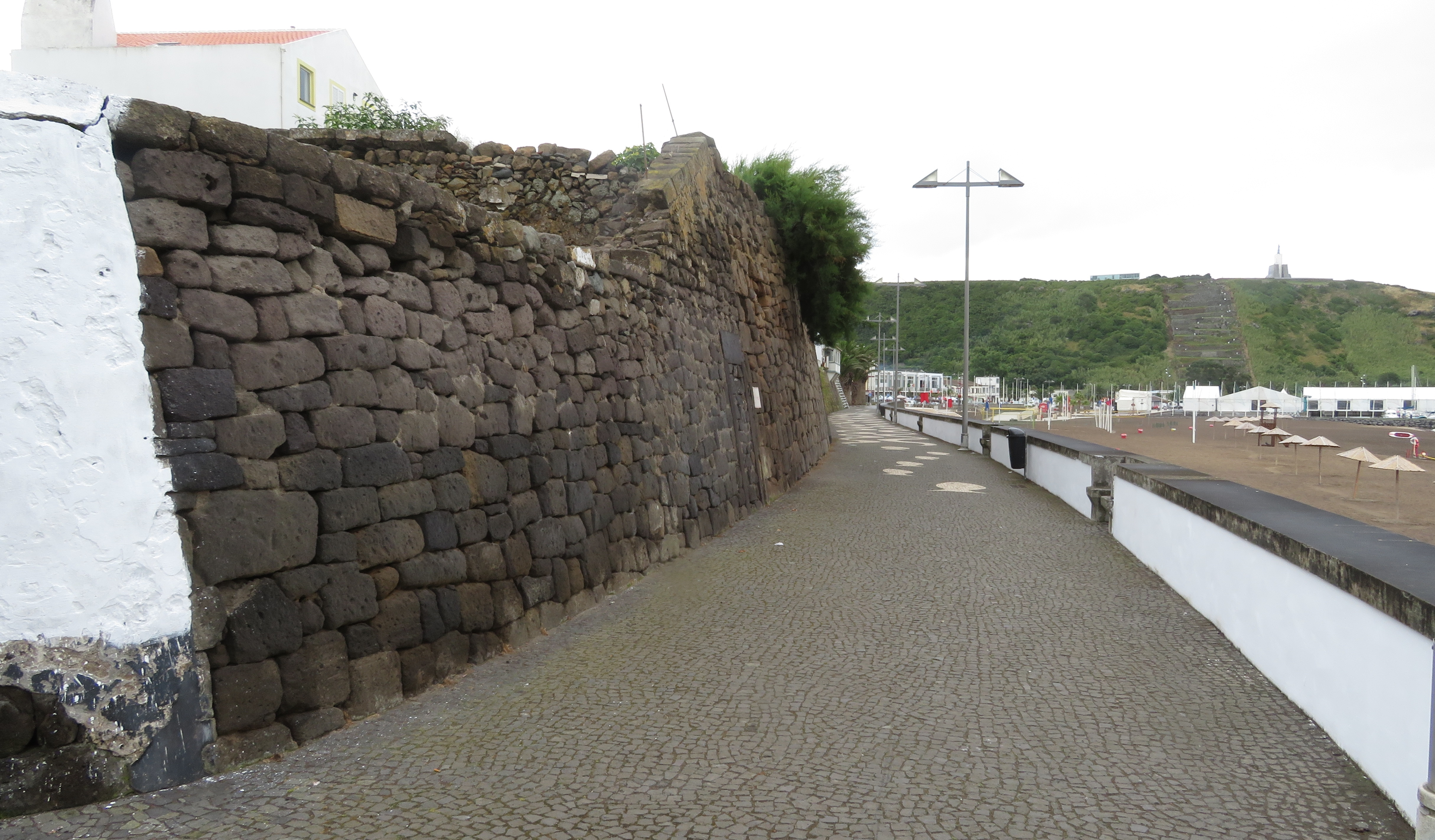
Old city wall

- Cocklestove of Boa Vista (Forno da Telha da Boa Vista)
- Cocklestove of Rua Gervásio Lima (Forno de Telha à Rua Gervásio Lima)
- Customshouse of Praia da Vitória (Casa da Alfândega)
- Fountain of Biscoito Bravo (Chafariz do Biscoito Bravo)
- Fountain of Caminho Novo (Chafariz do Caminho Novo)
- Fountain of Cruz do Pico (Chafariz da Cruz do Pico)
- Fountain of Largo Comendador Pamplona (Chafariz do Largo Comendador Pamplona)
- Fountain of Largo Conde da Praia da Vitória (Chafariz do Largo Conde da Praia da Vitória)
- Fountain of Largo da Luz (Chafariz do Largo da Luz)
- Fountain of Ribeira da Areia (Chafariz da Ribeira da Areia)
- Fountain of Pico da Rocha (Chafariz do Pico da Rocha)
- Fountain of Largo Francisco Maria Brum (Chafariz do Largo Francisco Maria Brum)
- Fountain of the Amoreiras (Chafariz das Amoreiras)
- Fountain of the Barreiro (Chafariz do Barreiro)
- Fountain of the Caldeira of Lajes (Chafariz da Caldeira das Lajes)
- Fountain of the Canada da Bezerra (Chafariz da Canada da Bezerra)
- Fountain of the Cruzeiro (Chafariz do Cruzeiro)
- Fountain of the Cruzeiro of Lajes (Chafariz do Cruzeiro das Lajes)
- Fountain of the Fontinhas (Chafariz das Fontinhas)
- Fountain of the Fundões (Chafariz dos Fundões)
- Fountain of the Ladeira do Cardoso (Chafariz da Ladeira do Cardoso)
- Fountain of the Malícias (Chafariz das Malícias)
- Fountain of the Quatro Canadas (Chafariz das Quatro Canadas)
- Hospital of the Misericórdia (Hospital da Misericórdia)
- Hospital of São Lázaro (Hospital de São Lázaro)
- Municipal Hall of Praia da Vitória (Câmara Municipal da Praia da Vitória)
- Municipal Market of Praia da Vitóra (Mercado Municipal da Praia da Vitória)
- Ramo Grande Auditorium (Auditório do Ramo Grande)
- Residence of Vitorino Nemésio (Casa de Vitorino Nemésio)
- Residence of Roda (Casa da Roda)
- Watermill of Rua dos Moinhos (Azenha da Rua dos Moinhos)
- Watermill of Agualva (Azenha da Ribeira da Agualva)
- City wall (Muralha), built of volcanic stones on the beach to protect the city against tsunamis and pirates

=== Military ===
- Fort of Chagas (Forte das Chagas)
- Fort of São João (Forte de São João)
- Fort of Luz (Forte da Luz)
- Fort of Nossa Senhora da Nazaré (Forte de Nossa Senhora da Nazaré)
- Fort of Rua Longa (Forte da Rua Longa)
- Fort of São Bento (Forte de São Bento)
- Fort of São Caetano (Forte de São Caetano)
- Fort of Santa Catarina (Forte de Santa Catarina)
- Fort of São Filipe (Forte de São Filipe)
- Fort of Santo Antão (Forte de Santo Antão)
- Fort of the Espírito Santo (Forte do Espírito Santo), little remains of this 16th century fort situated on the northern edge of the Bay of Praia, which was bombarded and nearly destroyed during the Liberal conflict. Its remnants survived to the 20th century, but were obliterated during the construction and support of the northern pier, even after a Luso-American compromise was established for its recuperation.
- Fort of the Porto (Forte do Porto)
- Fort of São Pedro, Port of Biscoitos (Forte do Porto dos Biscoitos)
- Fort Grande (Forte Grande)
- Post of the Fiscal Guard of Praia da Vitória (Posto Fiscal da Praia da Vitória)

=== Religious ===
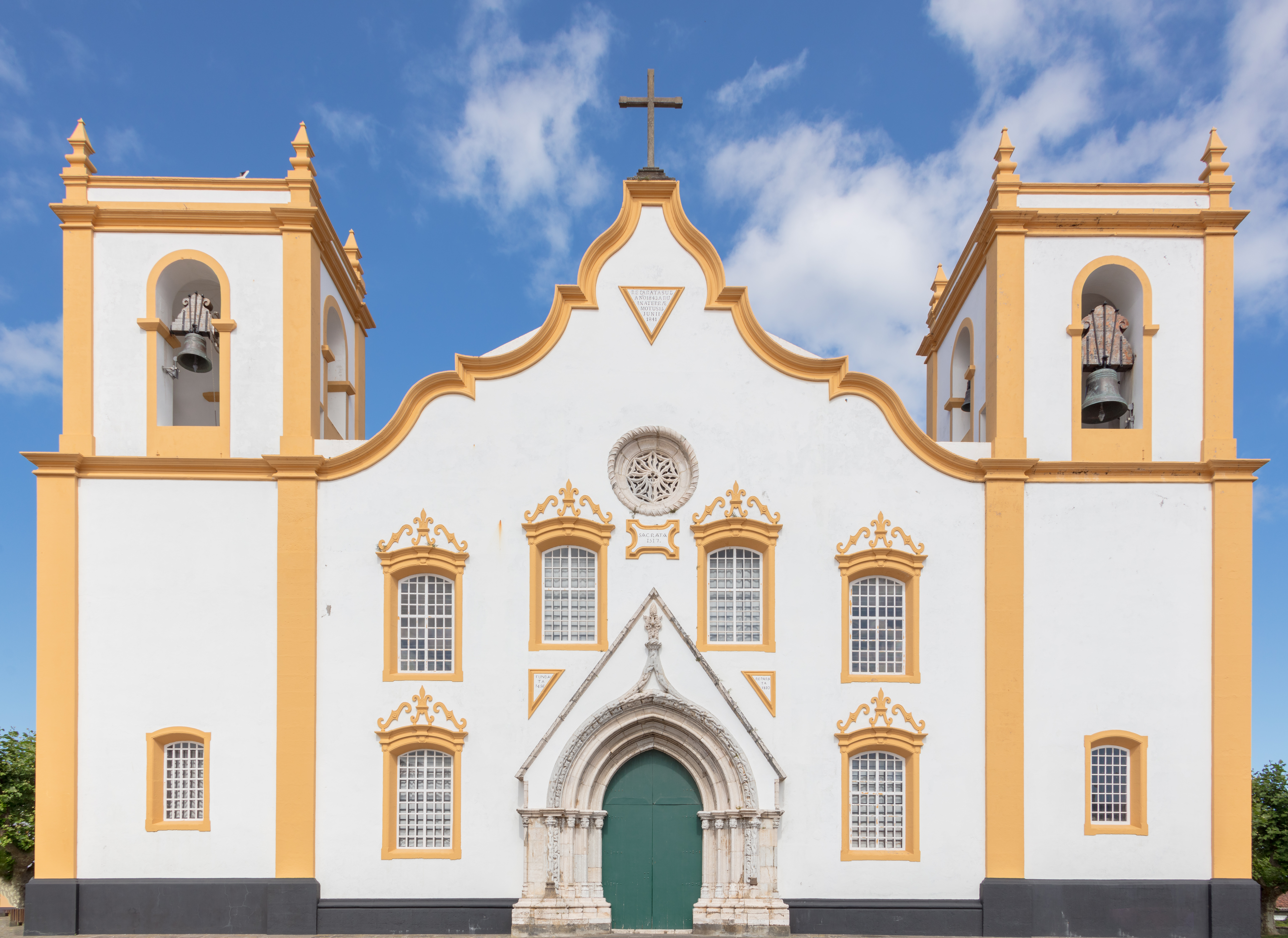
The parochial Matriz Church of Santa Cruz

- Church of Santa Cruz (Igreja de Santa Cruz)
- Church of Santa Bárbara (Igreja de Santa Bárbara)
- Church of Santa Beatriz (Igreja de Santa Beatriz)
- Church of São José, Santa Luzia e Santa Cruz (Igreja de São José, Santa Luzia, Santa Cruz)
- Church of Senhor Santo Cristo das Misericórdias (Igreja do Senhor Santo Cristo das Misericórdias)
- Hermitage of Nossa Senhora do Loreto (Ermida de Nossa Senhora do Loreto)
- Hermitage of Nossa Senhora dos Remédios (Ermida de Nossa Senhora dos Remédios), located in Santa Cruz, the early 17th century chapel survived the 1755 Lisbon earthquake, but it was only in the second half of the 18th century that any efforts were invested in restoring the chapel. Following the earthquake and effects of the tsunami, parishioners marched through the streets in procession for their deliverance;
- Hermitage of Santa Catarina (Ermida de Santa Catarina)
- Hermitage of Santa Rita (Ermida de Santa Rita)
- Hermitage of Santo António (Ermida de Santo António)
- Hermitage of São Lázaro (Ermida de São Lázaro)
- Hermitage of São Salvador (Ermida de São Salvador)
- Império of the Holy Spirit of Fonte do Bastardo (Império do Espírito Santo da Fonte do Bastardo)
- Império of the Holy Spirit of Quatro Ribeiras (Império do Espírito Santo das Quatro Ribeiras)
- Império of the Holy Spirit of Santa Cruz (Império do Espírito Santo de Santa Cruz)
- Império of the Holy Spirit of São Pedro (Império do Espírito Santo de São Pedro)
- Império of the Sailors (Império dos Marítimos), built in 1877 by fishermen from the neighbouring island of Pico at Largo José Silvestre Ribeiro Square

== Parks ==
In the municipal park (Jardim municipal) a monument was erected in 1879 in memory of José Silvestre Ribeiro (1807–1891), a Portuguese politician who organized the reconstruction of the city after the earthquake in 1841.

== Sport ==
It is popular with windsurfers because of the constant seabreezes. Praia da Vitoria hosts an annual triathlon and is known for its unique style of bullfighting, tourada à corda.

== Notable citizens ==
- Álvaro Martins Homem III (c. 1490 in Praia da Vitória – 1535) a nobleman, 3rd Donatary-Captain of Praia da Vitória
- Alberto del Canto (1547 in Praia da Vitória – 1611) conquistador and explorer of the north of Mexico
- Alexandre Martins Pamplona Ramos (1864 in Santa Cruz – 1933) a physician and politician.
- Vitorino Nemésio (1901 in Praia da Vitória – 1978) a poet, author and intellectual
- Luis Gil Bettencourt (born 1956 in Praia da Vitória) a Portuguese-American musician, songwriter and music producer.
- Artur Lima (born 1963 in Santa Cruz) a dentist and politician
- Nuno Bettencourt (born 1966 in Praia da Vitória) a Portuguese-American guitarist, singer-songwriter, and record producer; lead guitarist of the Boston rock band Extreme
