= Porto Martins =

- Civil parish
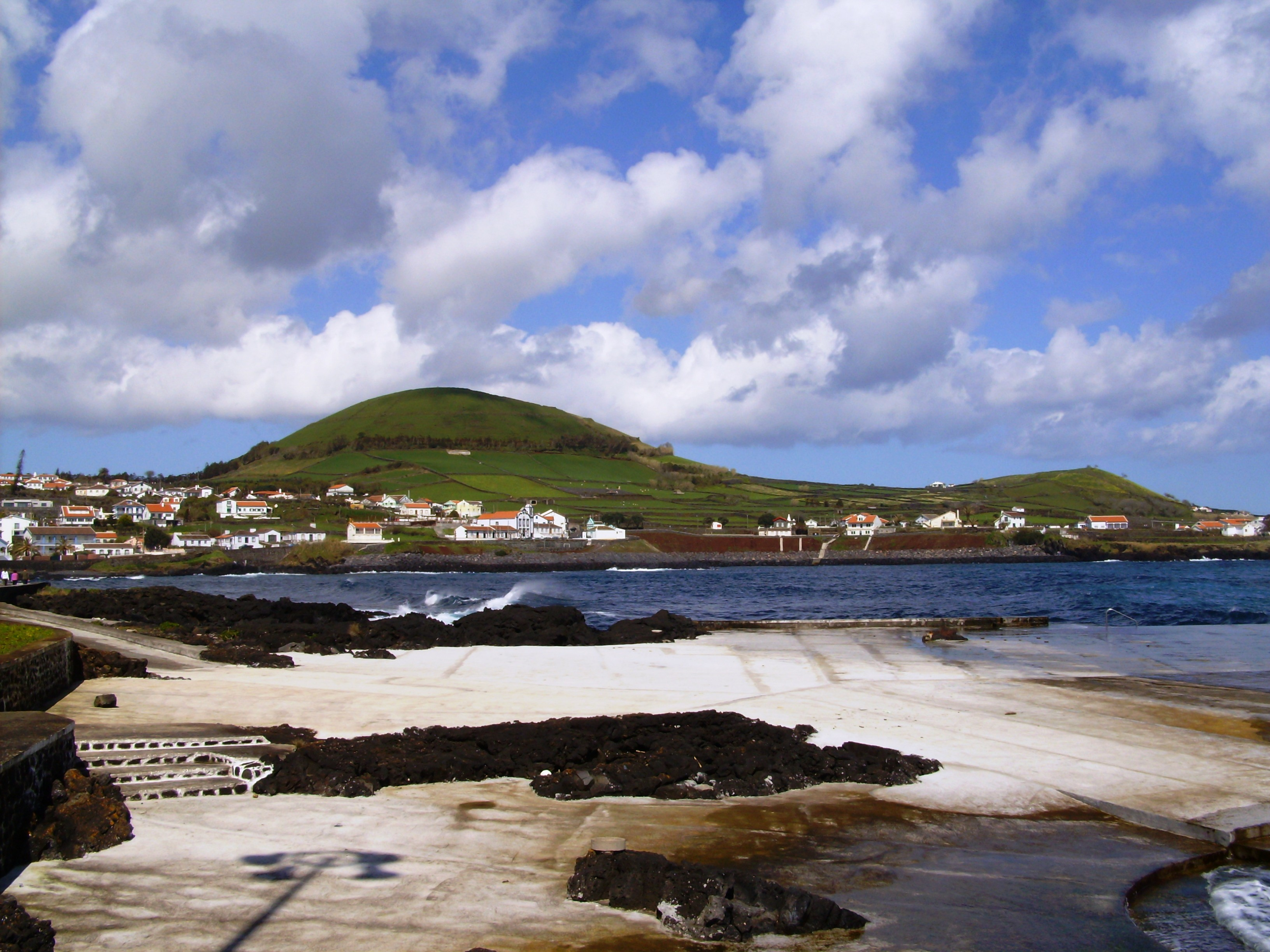
- A panoramic vista of the coast of Porto Martins, and the extinct spatter cone Capitão

- Location in the Azores Porto Martins (Terceira)
- Coordinates: 38°41′8″N 27°3′44″W
- Country: Portugal
- Auton. region: Azores
- Island: Terceira
- Municipality: Praia da Vitória

Area
  - Total: 3.43 km^{2} (1.32 sq mi)

Population (2011)
  - Total: 1,001
  - Density: 292/km^{2} (756/sq mi)
- Time zone: UTC−01:00 (AZOT)
  - Summer (DST): UTC+00:00 (AZOST)
- Postal code: 9760-090
- Area code: 292
- Patron: Santa Margarida
- Website: www.freguesiaportomartins.com

Porto Martins is a civil parish in the municipality of Praia da Vitória, on the island of Terceira in the Portuguese Azores. The population in 2011 was 1,001, in an area of 3.43 km^{2}.

== History ==
Porto Martins was deannexed from the neighbouring parish of Cabo da Praia on 9 May 2001.

The parish owes a lot to the philanthropy of José Coelho Pamplona, 1st Viscount of Porto Martim, a native of the parish, who donated funds towards the construction of the parochial church, expanding the older Chapel of Santa Margarida, the primary school, in addition to the primitive system of fountains, which supported the local population. The Viscount was an illustrious figure in the Portuguese community in São Paulo.

== Geography ==
Porto Martins landscape is varied, characterized by rock-covered vineyards and orchards, particularly olive fields, which are uncharacteristic of the humid climate. The parish contains the localities Ponta da Maria, Ponta Negra, Porto do São Fernando, Porto Martins, Praia de Porto Martins, Nossa Senhora dos Remédios, Recanto, Santo António, Serra and Santa Margarida.

== Architecture ==
=== Civic ===
- Chafariz do Largo Comendador Pamplona

=== Military ===
- Fort of Nossa Senhora da Nazaré (English: Fort of Our Lady of Nazareth)
- Fort of São Bento (English: Fort of Saint Benedict)
- Fort of São Filipe (English: Fort of Saint Phillip)

=== Religious ===
- Parochial Church of Porto Martins
- Império of the Divino Espírito Santo

== Gallery ==
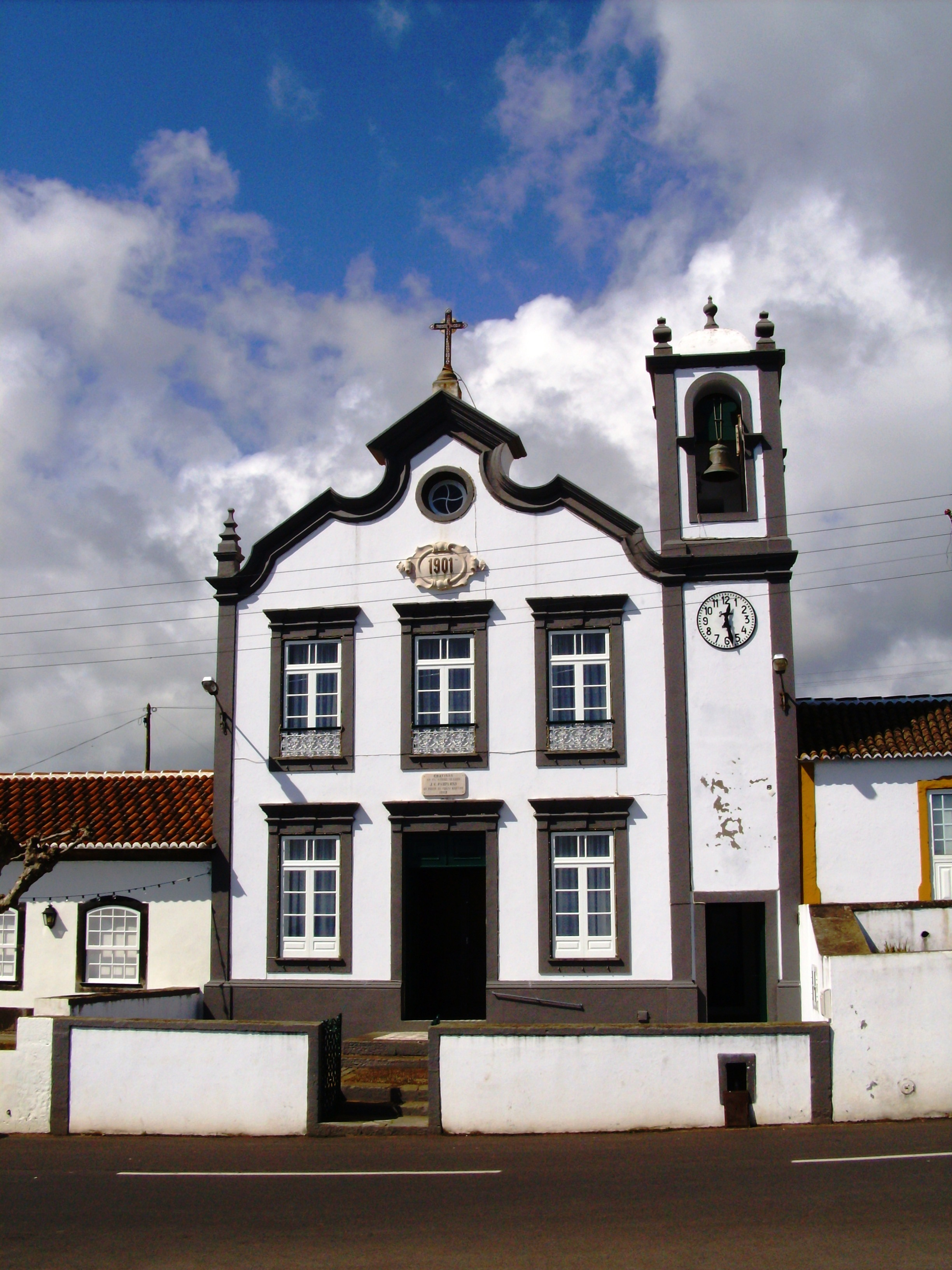
Church of Santa Margarida, constructed by the 1st Viscount of Porto Martins.

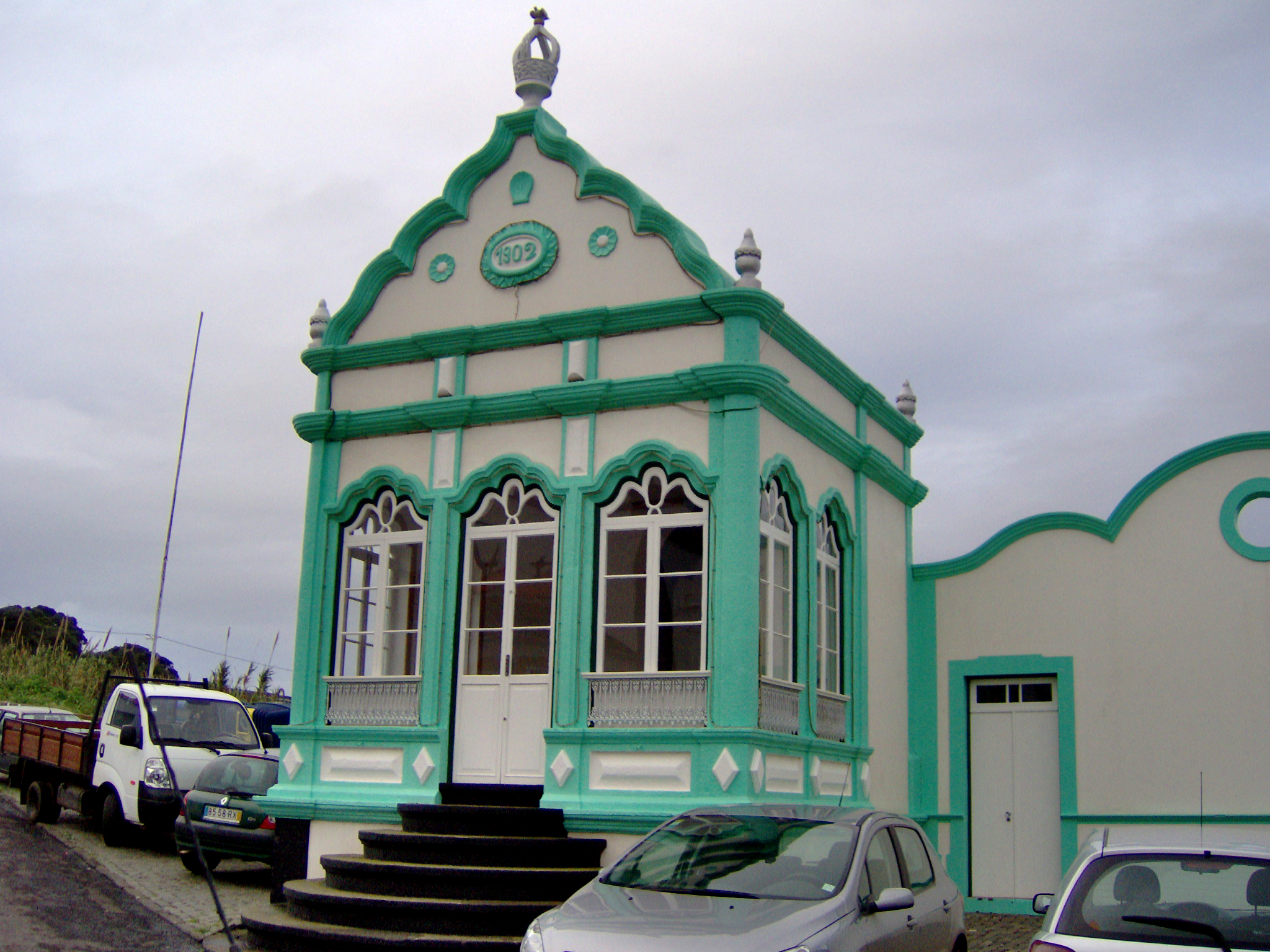
The Império Divino Espírito Santo, used in the annual festivals to the Holy Spirit in Porto Martins.

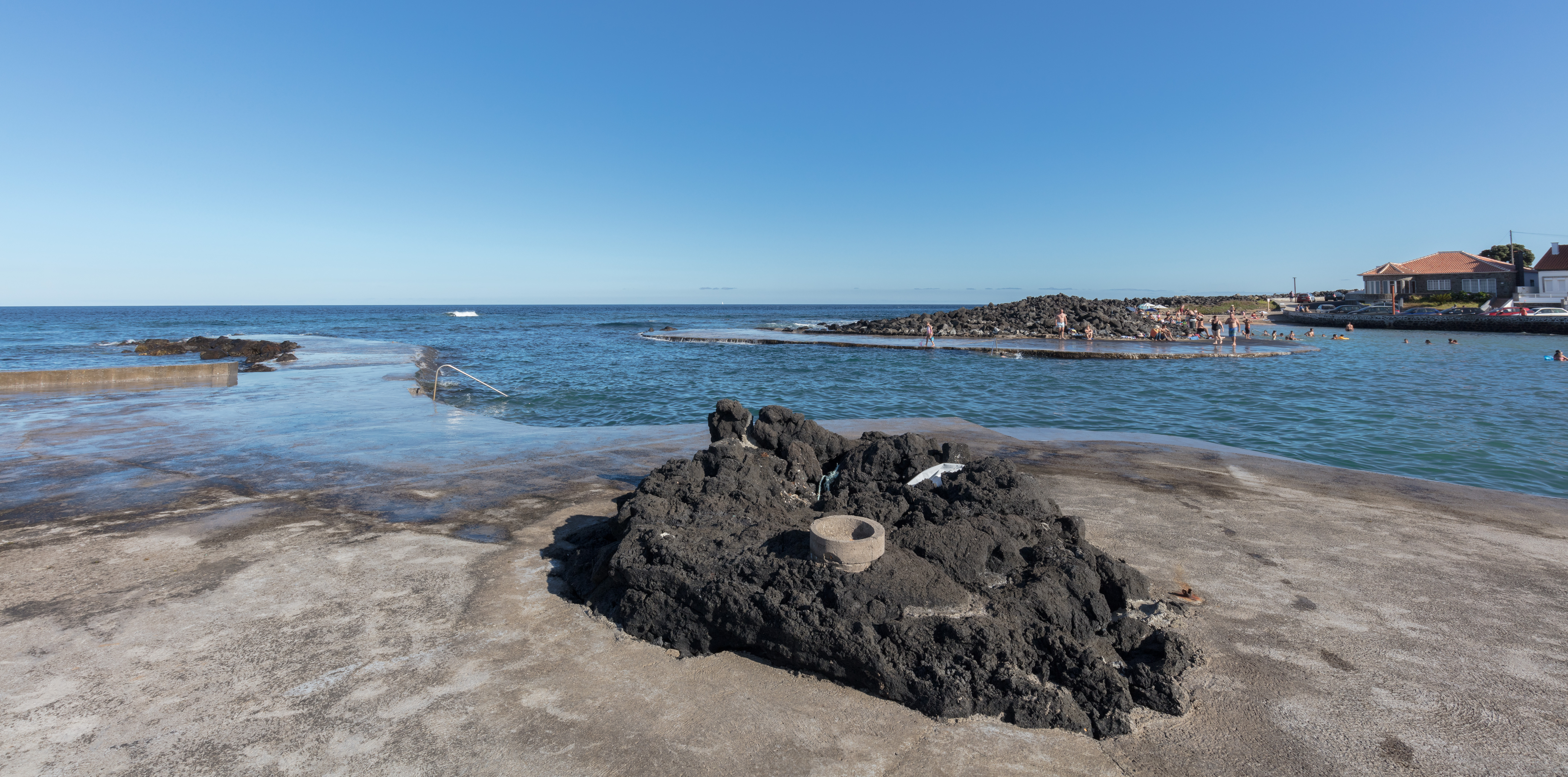
Natural pools.
