= Alexandre Martins Pamplona Ramos =

Portuguese physician and politician

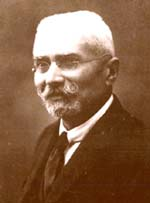
- Portrait of Alexandre Ramos (1910)

Civil Governor of the Autonomous District of Angra do Heroísmo
- In office 1925–1925
- President: Manuel Teixeira Gomes
- Prime Minister: Vitorino Máximo de Carvalho Guimarães; António Maria da Silva

Personal details
- Born: Alexandre Martins Pamplona Corte Real; 6 June 1864 Santa Cruz
- Died: 4 February 1933 (aged 68) Angra do Heroísmo
- Cause of death: Heart attack
- Resting place: Angra do Heroísmo
- Citizenship: Portuguese
- Party: Partido Progressista
- Other political affiliations: Partido Regenerador
- Spouse: Hermínia (or Armínia) Amélia Moniz da Maia
- Parents: Maria do Livramento Martins Pamplona Ramos (father); António Ramos Moniz Corte-Real (mother)
- Education: Escola Médico-Cirúgica de Lisboa
- Occupation: Physician
- Profession: Medicine, Clinical Scientist
- Known for: Medical career and participation in treatment of bubonic plague on the island of Terceira

Alexandre Martins Pamplona Ramos (6 June 1864, Santa Cruz – 4 February 1933) was a Portuguese physician and politician.

== Biography ==
Son of António Ramos Moniz Corte-Real and Maria do Livramento Martins Pamplona Ramos, Alexandre Ramos was the descendant of an important line of hereditary seigneurs from the Ramo Grande region of Terceira. His family was linked, on his father side, to Manuel Inácio Martins Pamplona Corte Real, the 1st Count of Subserra.

=== Medic ===
A proficient scholar in medicine, the young Ramos completed his preparatory studies in Praia, before joining the Escola Médico-Cirúgica de Lisboa ("Lisbon Medical-Surgical School") where he became a surgeon, obtaining recognition and praise for his competency. In 1891, as a 5th year student, Alexandre Ramos was the first to diagnose a case of paroxysmal hemoglobinuria in Portugal, a rare form of Autoimmune hemolytic anemia, which he later studied as part of his licentiate thesis (oriented by Professor José Curry da Câmara Cabral, that was published in 1895).

Following his studies, he concentrated on treating the sick, in addition to studying plague, in order prevent its spread, where his exhaustive studies put his life at risk. Eventually, Ramos became a doctor in the municipal hospital of Praia da Vitoria. During an outbreak of the infectious bubonic plague (spreading from house-to-house on the island), he worked with colleague António Joaquim de Sousa Júnior to treat patients and discovered solutions to reduce the propagation of the infection. For his work, professors Fernand Widal and Francisco Pulido Valente, recognized him for his work as a clinical scientist and helping in the treatment of the sick.

=== Politician ===
At 35 years of age, Alexandre Ramos entered the political arena, leading the Partido Regenerador in Praia da Vitória, and then island-wide, where he obtained several electoral majorities. He, later, switched parties joining the Partido Progressista following the fall of the monarchy (5 October 1910), assuming the leadership of the Partido da União Republicana of Manuel de Brito Camacho, where he was able to juggle both a professional and political career.

For his work, he was made Knight in the Order of St. James of the Sword (on 22 July 1901), and appointed sub-legate for health in Praia da Vitória, where he continued to serve the community in a modest, humble clinic. Along with Manuel António Lino and Maria Teodora Pimetal, Ramos was awarded for his dedication and zeal in the fight against the plague, until 31 December 1909.

For a few months in 1925, he was appointed as the Civil Governor of the Autonomous District of Angra do Heroísmo.

=== Later life ===
Alexandre Ramos married Hermínia (or Armínia) Amélia Moniz da Maia, and had five children.

He died of a heart attack on 4 February 1933, at home, along Rua de São João in Angra do Heroísmo. Accounts indicate that his last words were:

...if you believe in resurrection of man, there you will find us.

A medic who believed in service and charity, rarely interested in the privilege of class and society, he died a pauper. He was buried the following day.
