= Agualva (Praia da Vitória) =

- Civil parish
- Location in the Azores Agualva (Terceira)
- Coordinates: 38°46′27″N 27°10′22″W
- Country: Portugal
- Auton. region: Azores
- Island: Terceira
- Municipality: Praia da Vitória
- Established: Parish: 29 February 1588

Area
  - Total: 38.75 km^{2} (14.96 sq mi)
- Elevation: 130 m (430 ft)

Population (2011)
  - Total: 1,432
  - Density: 37/km^{2} (96/sq mi)
- Time zone: UTC−01:00 (AZOT)
  - Summer (DST): UTC+00:00 (AZOST)
- Postal code: 9760-020
- Area code: 292
- Patron: Nossa Senhora da Guadalupe
- Website: www.jf-agualva.pt

Agualva is a civil parish in the municipality of Praia da Vitória on the island of Terceira in the Azores. The population in 2011 was 1,432, in an area of 38.75 km². The parish lies at a mean of 186 metres above sea level. It contains the localities Ladeira de Nossa Senhora, Portela, Outeiro Filipe, Outeiros, Cabouco de Trás and São Joões.

== Geography ==
Agualva is the largest civil parish on the island. The church of this village, Igreja Paroquial, is dedicated to the Our Lady of Guadalupe. The feast dedicated to her is celebrated beginning on the 15th of August each year. There are some mills that have been well preserved, which give Agualva beauty and charm. In this village, there are many orchards and groves as well as an abundance of water. To the west of the village of Agualva, on the border with Quatro Ribeiras, are the twin volcanic peaks of "Pico Alto", at 807 meters, and "Pico Agudo", at 798 meters, some of the highest mountains on the island.

Along Agualva’s rivers, the Agualva River (Ribeira de Agualva) and its tributary the Filipe River (Ribiera de Filipe), there are 48 mills that formerly ground flour for the island's inhabitants. Agualva is the main civil parish that supplies the municipality of Praía da Vitória with water.

Agualva’s well-irrigated and fertile land allows for large production of produce from its orchards of various fruits. Currently, the main economic activity is agro-livestock, followed by the sawing of wood thanks to the village's large forest, metal mechanics and arboriculture.

About 200 years ago, Agualva was little more than a large orchard, with just a few houses. Back then, the produce cultivated in its orchards included chestnuts, walnuts, pears, apples, and oranges. Later on, this agricultural focus has changed, with the fields essentially being used only as pastures for dairy cows, including the cattle of Ramo Grande, which is a breed native to the Azores.

In the past, cattle goats existed in Agualva in large numbers and would destroy and harm the natural vegetation. Because of this, Captain-General Francisco António de Araújo e Azevedo forced a reduction of the goat population to a minimum.

Agualva, also known as the land of Ramo Grande cattle, possesses some of the best and flattest lands on the island. In 1643, these lands yielded between 500 and 600 “moios” of wheat as a feudal payment to the king of Portugal.

== History ==
The exact date when the first inhabitants of Agualva settled in the village is unknown. It is known, however, that the settlement began sometime before the year 1588. On the 29th of February in 1588, the village of Agualva along with its parish was formally established with a documented charter. Agualva parish had previously been part of the parish of Vila Nova.

On February 3 of 1594, João Homem Guadalupe established a hermitage, which would eventually become the Church of Our Lady of Guadalupe, its name honouring the parish's founder as well as Our Lady of Guadalupe.

A letter from Pêro Anes do Canto to the King of Portugal, dated the 16th of August 1552, refers to Agualva: "Sire – I have some properties in Terceira, in places known as Aguaalva and Lajes....” It is notable that in this letter the spelling is "Aguaalva," which combines the Portuguese words água (water) and alva (clear). The original document is preserved in the Torre do Tombo, the Portuguese National Archive in Lisbon.

The village was fully operational by the end of the 16th century. This is attested by the recording of a baptism that occurred on 18 December 1607. The document shows that the parents of the girl being baptised came from the parish of Our Lady of Guadalupe.
