= Quatro Ribeiras =

Quatro Riberias
- Civil parish
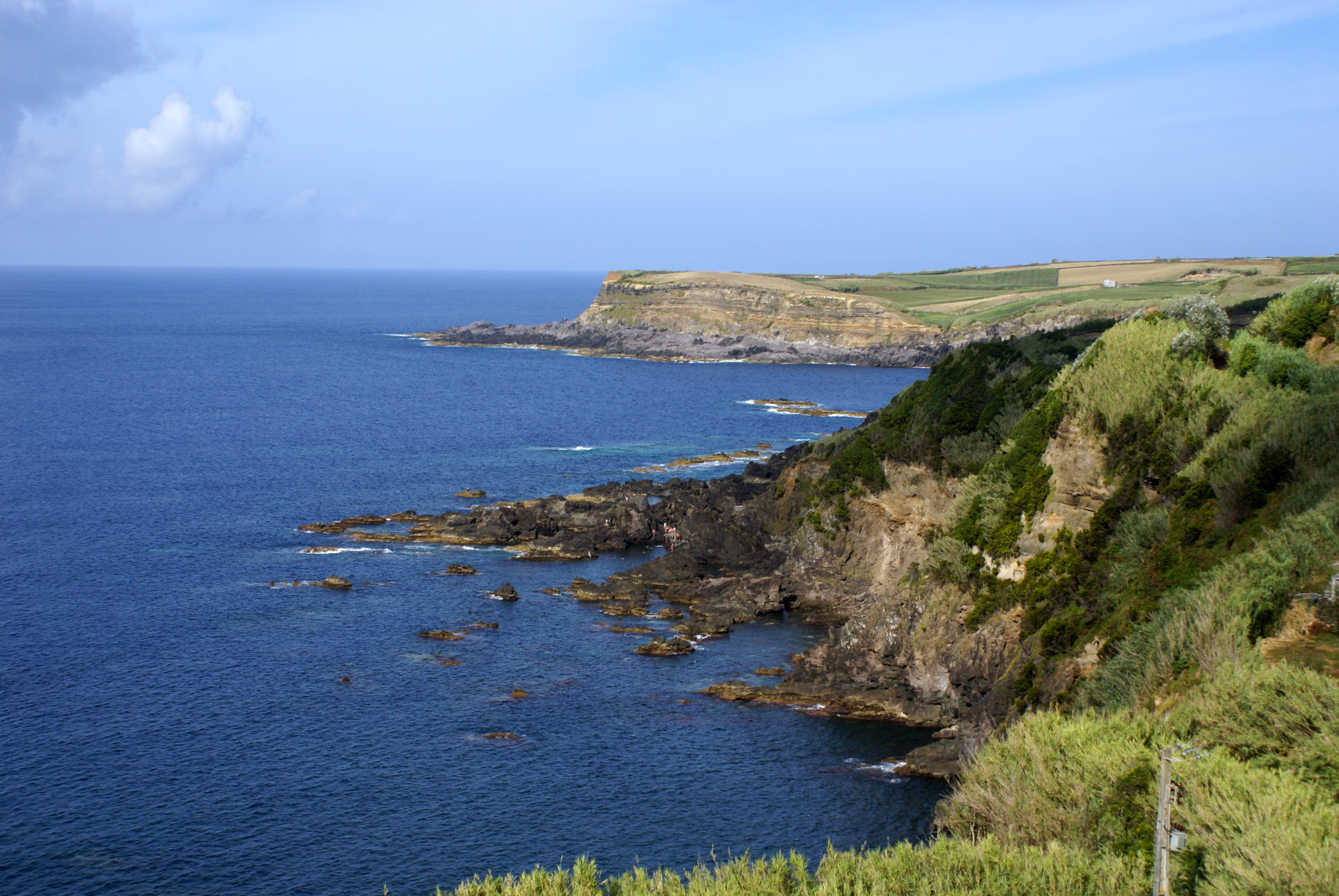
- The northern coast of Quatro Ribeiras, as seen from the Miradouro dos Moinhos English: Lookout of the Windmills)

- Location in the Azores Quatro Riberias (Terceira)
- Coordinates: 38°47′24″N 27°13′28″W
- Country: Portugal
- Auton. region: Azores
- Island: Terceira
- Municipality: Praia da Vitória

Area
  - Total: 12.83 km^{2} (4.95 sq mi)
- Elevation: 52 m (171 ft)

Population (2011)
  - Total: 394
  - Density: 30.7/km^{2} (79.5/sq mi)
- Time zone: UTC−01:00 (AZOT)
  - Summer (DST): UTC+00:00 (AZOST)
- Postal code: 9760-351
- Area code: 292
- Website: www.jf4ribeiras.com

Quatro Ribeiras is a civil parish in the municipality of Praia da Vitoria on the northern coast of the Portuguese island of Terceira in the Azores. The population in 2011 was 394, in an area of 12.83 km^{2}. It is the least populous parish in the municipality. It contains the localities Boqueiro, Canada do Cruzeiro, Canada do Saco, Canada do Velho, Farroco, Quatro Ribeiras and Rebentão do Bom Jesus.

Situated on a rocky massif by seaside, this locality is crossed by four streams - Ribeira Grande, Ribeira Pequena, Ribeira Seca and Ribeira do Almeida -, thus the name Quatro Ribeiras.

== History ==
According to the chronicles, it was one of the first settlements of the island. Built in devotion to Santa Beatriz, one of the first churches of the island was built here in the fifteenth century.

== Natural Heritage ==
- Gruta das Pombas
- Baía das Quatro Ribeiras
- Costa das Quatro Ribeiras
- Pico dos Loiros
- Zona Balnear das Quatro Ribeiras

== Architectural Heritage ==
- Chafariz do Cruzeiro
- Igreja de Santa Beatriz
- Império do Espírito Santo de Quatro Ribeiras
- Miradouro da Rocha Alta
- Miradouro dos Moinhos
