= São Brás (Praia da Vitória) =

- Civil parish
- Location in the Azores São Brás (Terceira)
- Coordinates: 38°45′48″N 27°7′55″W
- Country: Portugal
- Auton. region: Azores
- Island: Terceira
- Municipality: Praia da Vitória
- Established: Settlement: fl. 1480; Parish: fl. 1500; Civil parish: 17 February 1951

Area
  - Total: 4.68 km^{2} (1.81 sq mi)
- Elevation: 114 m (374 ft)

Population (2011)
  - Total: 1,088
  - Density: 230/km^{2} (600/sq mi)
- Time zone: UTC−01:00 (AZOT)
  - Summer (DST): UTC+00:00 (AZOST)
- Postal code: 9760-664
- Area code: 292
- Website: www.jfsaobras.com

São Brás (Portuguese: Saint Blaise) is a landlocked civil parish in the municipality of Praia da Vitória on the Portuguese island of Terceira in the Azores. The population in 2011 was 1,088, in an area of 4.68 km². It contains the localities Baldio, Canada da Quinta, Canada das Covas, Cruz, Fundões, Ladeira do Cardosa, Lourais, Quatro Canadas and São Brás.
