= Cabo da Praia =

- Civil parish
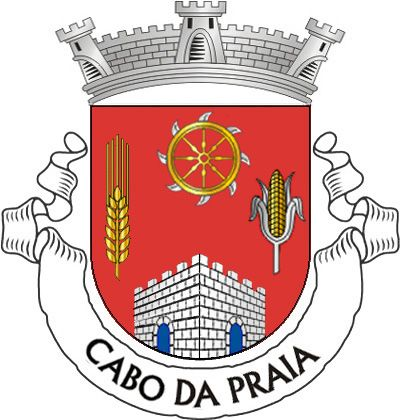
- Flag

- Location in the Azores Cabo da Praia (Terceira)
- Coordinates: 38°42′20″N 27°3′23″W
- Country: Portugal
- Auton. region: Azores
- Island: Terceira
- Municipality: Praia da Vitória

Area
  - Total: 3.18 km^{2} (1.23 sq mi)
- Elevation: 18 m (59 ft)

Population (2011)
  - Total: 712
  - Density: 220/km^{2} (580/sq mi)
- Time zone: UTC−01:00 (AZOT)
  - Summer (DST): UTC+00:00 (AZOST)
- Postal code: 9760-127
- Area code: 292

Cabo da Praia is a civil parish on the east coast of the municipality of Praia da Vitória on the island of Terceira in the Portuguese Azores. The population in 2011 was 712, in an area of 3.18 km^{2} (1.23 sq mi). It contains the localities Cabo da Praia, Caminho do Meio and Santa Catarina.
