= Santa Cruz, Praia da Vitória =

Santa Cruz
- Civil parish
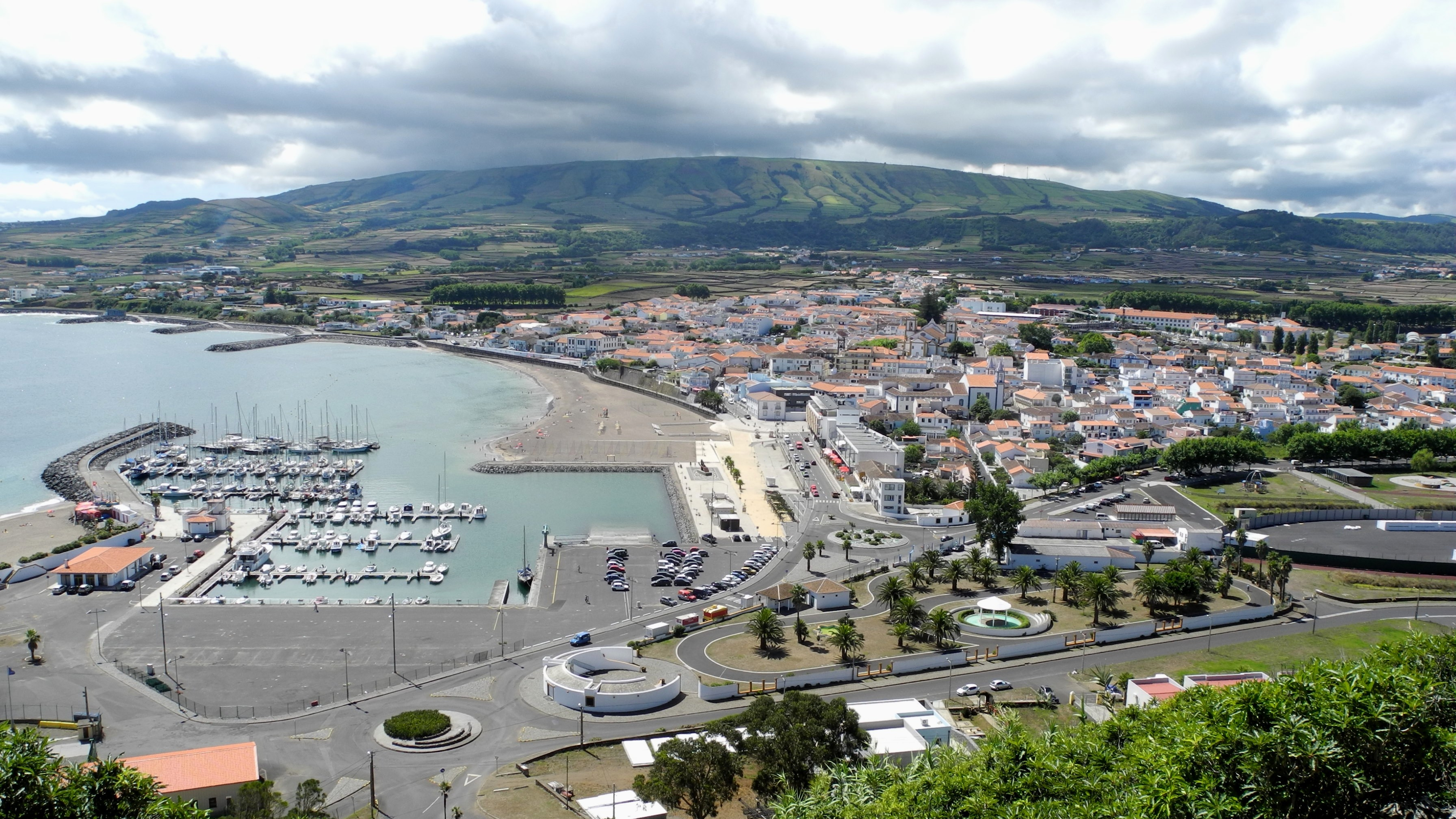
- A view of the city centre of Praia da Vitória, the core of the civil parish of Santa Cruz

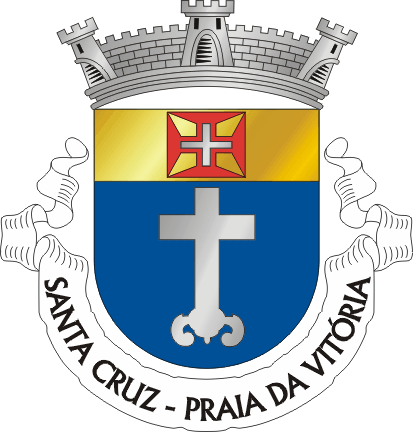
- Coat of arms

- Location in the Azores Santa Cruz (Terceira)
- Coordinates: 38°43′46″N 27°03′58″W
- Country: Portugal
- Auton. region: Azores
- Island: Terceira
- Municipality: Praia da Vitória

Area
  - Total: 30.09 km^{2} (11.62 sq mi)

Population (2011)
  - Total: 6,690
  - Density: 222/km^{2} (576/sq mi)
- Time zone: UTC−01:00 (AZOT)
  - Summer (DST): UTC+00:00 (AZOST)
- Postal code: 9760-438
- Area code: 295
- Patron: Holy Cross
- Website: www.jfsantacruz.com

Santa Cruz is a parish in the municipality of Praia da Vitória on the island of Terceira in the Portuguese Azores. The population in 2011 was 6,690, in an area of 30.09 km^{2}. It contains the localities Santa Luzia, Santa Rita, Juncal, Casa da Ribeira and Santa Cruz.
