= Cinco Ribeiras =

- Civil parish
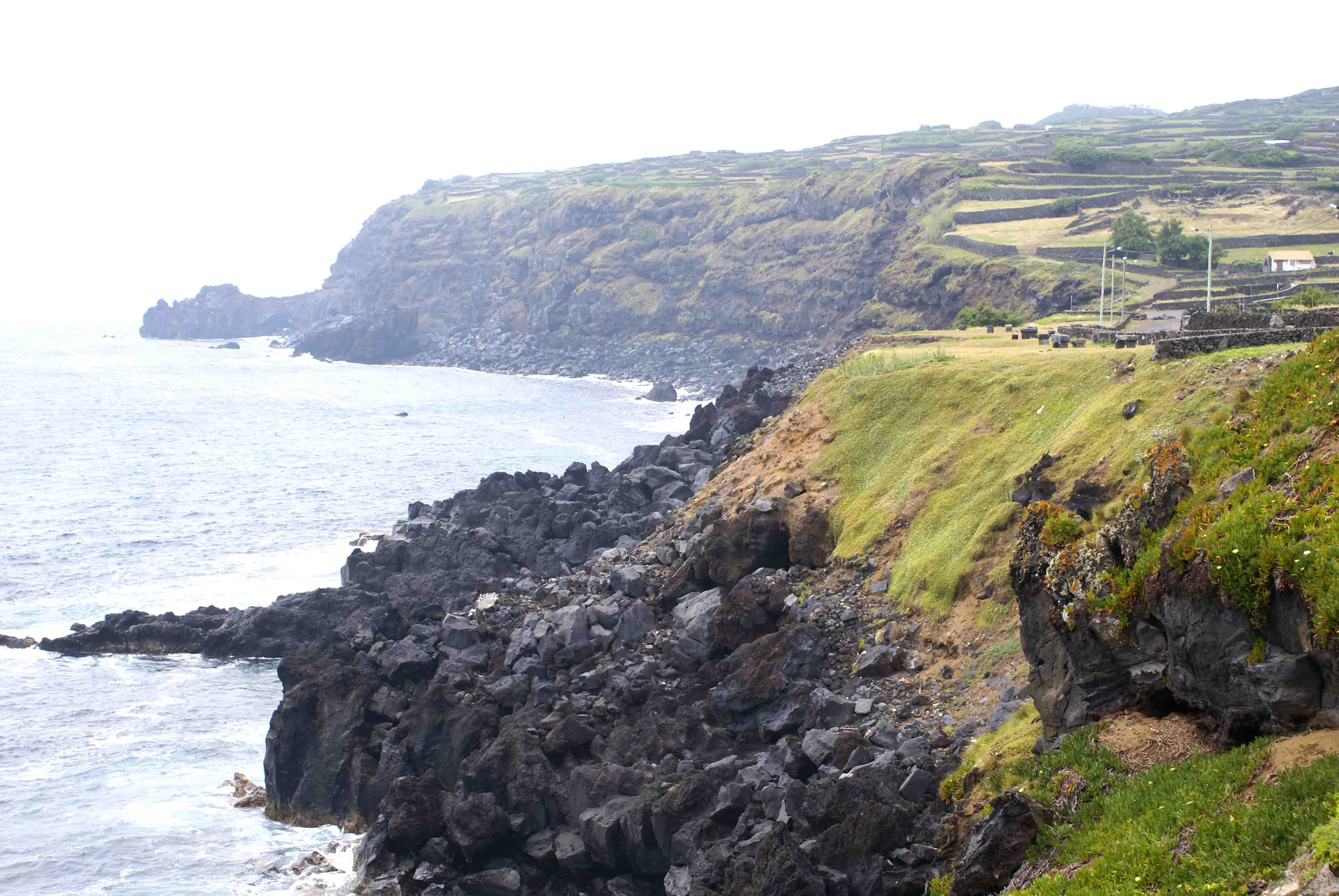
- The coastline along the southern frontier of Cinco Ribeiras near the cave of the same name

- Location of the civil parish in Terceira
- Coordinates: 38°41′0″N 27°19′1″W
- Country: Portugal
- Auton. region: Azores
- Island: Terceira
- Municipality: Angra do Heroísmo
- Established: Settlement: fl. 1800; Parish: c. 1867; Civil parish: c. 1879

Area
  - Total: 10.80 km^{2} (4.17 sq mi)
- Elevation: 121 m (397 ft)

Population (2011)
  - Total: 704
  - Density: 65.2/km^{2} (169/sq mi)
- Time zone: UTC−01:00 (AZOT)
  - Summer (DST): UTC+00:00 (AZOST)
- Postal code: 9700-321
- Area code: 292 XXX XXX
- Patron: Nossa Senhora do Pilar
- Website: www.jf5ribeiras.com

Cinco Ribeiras (pronounced [ˈsĩ.ku ʁi.ˈbɐj.ɾɐʃ]) is a civil parish in the municipality of Angra do Heroísmo on the island of Terceira in the Portuguese archipelago of the Azores. The population in 2011 was 704, in an area of 12.80 km^{2}.

== Geography ==
=== Physical geography ===
The parish of Cinco Ribeiras is situated on the southwest coast of the island of Terceira, occupying a roughly triangler swath from the coast to the summit of the volcano of Santa Bárbara in the island's interior. It is an area of approximately 11.38 square kilometres (4.39 mi^{2}), that reaches an altitude of 1,021 metres (3,350 ft) above sea level. It is bordered on the east by the civil parish of São Bartolomeu de Regatos and west by the parish of Santa Bárbara das Nove Ribeiras, as well as, along a short frontier to the north, with the parish of Altares.

The parish's southern coast is formed from a 20–30 metres (66–98 ft) high arriba, marked by its only major geological structure, the Ponta das Cinco, a rocky spur formed by a basaltic dike that penetrated one of the radial faults, along the Serra de Santa Bárbara. Yet, running through the region are several smaller volcanic cones composed of black or red basaltic rock. The lower part of the parish developed along a planar zone that corresponds with the terminal area of basaltic fissural flows from the region of Pico da Bagacina, resulting in a gently sloping area towards the northwest. This area is occupied by relatively recent lava flows, with little evidence of pyroclastic eruptive material, translating into shallow soils and rocky covering.

Towards the west and interior, the slope gradually increases, passing into a transition zone towards the cone of the Serra de Santa Bárbara. The highest part of the parish, the apex of the administrative frontier corresponds to the watercourses that divide the ravines of Praia da Vitória and Cinco Ribeiras, an area of accentuated slopes, reaching the summit of the caldera of Santa Bárbara (the highest point on the island of Terceira). Apart from this volcano, the parish is little accented, with only the Pico da Praia, at 323 metres (1,060 ft) above sea level, representing the highest altitude in the parish.

Cinco Ribeiras is crossed by three primary ravines: the Ribeira do Mouro, the Ribeira das Cinco and the Ribeira da Praia, that are part of the radial drainage system, of the Santa Bárbara Massif.

=== Climate ===
Situated along the southwest of the Serra de Santa Bárbara, the parish occupies a transition zone between oceanic and Mediterranean climate (on the Köppen-Geiger classification between Csb, on the lower areas, and Cfb, on higher altitudes), exposed to strong southwest winds, resulting in elevated humidity during periods of atmospheric instability, intense orthographic precipitation in the higher altitudes. Precipitation along the massif results in flooding along the shallow ravines, which are unable to transport the water that flows from the higher altitudes.

=== Human geography ===
Population of Cinco Ribeiras (1890 - 2011)
Year	Pop.	±%
1890	1,019	—
1900	1,180	+15.8%
1911	1,149	−2.6%
1920	1,017	−11.5%
1930	1,020	+0.3%
1940	1,072	+5.1%
1950	1,024	−4.5%
1960	1,018	−0.6%
1970	880	−13.6%
1981	657	−25.3%
1991	650	−1.1%
2001	684	+5.2%
2011	704	+2.9%

Urban development, much like the other settlements of Terceira, is constituted by a linear structure, that follows the main roadway that circles the island, with little expansion into the fields. The lateral roads normally accompany the ravines, except for the area between Ribeira do Mouro and Ribeira das Cinco, where smaller urban agglomerations developed along the municipal road of Canadinhas, the circuits 200 metres (660 ft) above the Regional Roadway to connect Cinco Ribeiras and Terra Chã (through São Bartolomeu de Regatos).

Another nucleus in development, constituted by primarily summer homes, developed around the porto of Cinco Ribeiras, circling the small hermitage of Nossa Senhora de Lurdes, in addition to a few homes in the Canada do Porto alongside.

Following the 1991 census the parish included 650 inhabitants (138 males and 114 female residents), included in the localities referred to as Ribeira das Cinco (51 inhabitants), Ribeira do Mouro (84 inhabitants) and Cinco Ribeiras (418 inhabitants). The population decreased during the 20th century, from its apex of 1180 residents around 1900.

The evolution of the parish has been marked by emigration, primarily to Brasil, then the United States and finally to Canada. During the 20th century, the population maintained stable until the middle of the 1960s; then, following facilitated emigration laws and the consequence of the Kennedy-Pastore Act, the population began a rapid decline until it stabilized following the Carnation Revolution.

== Architecture ==
The traditional architecture of Cinco Ribeiras resembles much of the rural homes of the western Terceira region, and is generally constructed around a single floor. The settlement is also distinguished for its many white-washed homes, bordered by multi-coloured trim around the corners, doors and windows (unique for the island of Terceira).

- Church of Nossa Senhora do Pilar (Portuguese: Igreja Paroquial de Cinco Ribeiras/Igreja de Nossa Senhora do Pilar)
- Império of Holy Spirit of Cinco Ribeiras Portuguese: Império do Espírito Santo de Cinco Ribeiras
