= Fort of São Pedro (Biscoitos) =

16th-century fort in the Azores, Portugal

- Forte de São Pedro
- Biscoitos, Terceira Island, Azores in Portugal
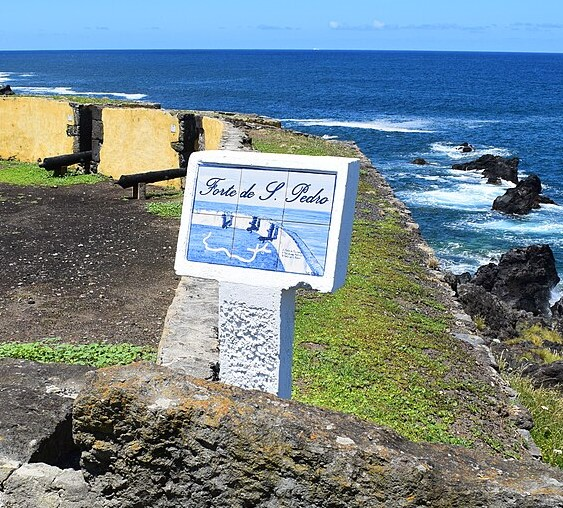

Site information
- Type: Bastion
- Open to the public: Yes.
- Condition: Partly preserved

Location
- Coordinates: 38°48′01″N 27°15′43″W

Site history
- Built: 1520
- Built by: Pedro Anes do Canto
- Battles/wars: Unknown

The Fort of São Pedro, also known as the Fort of the Port of Biscoitos, is located in the parish of Biscoitos, in the municipality of Praia da Vitória, on the north coast of Terceira Island in the Azores. It was designed to defend the Biscoitos bay against attacks by pirates and privateers, who were once frequent in this region of the Atlantic Ocean. It crossed fire with the Fort of Rua Longa, to the east.

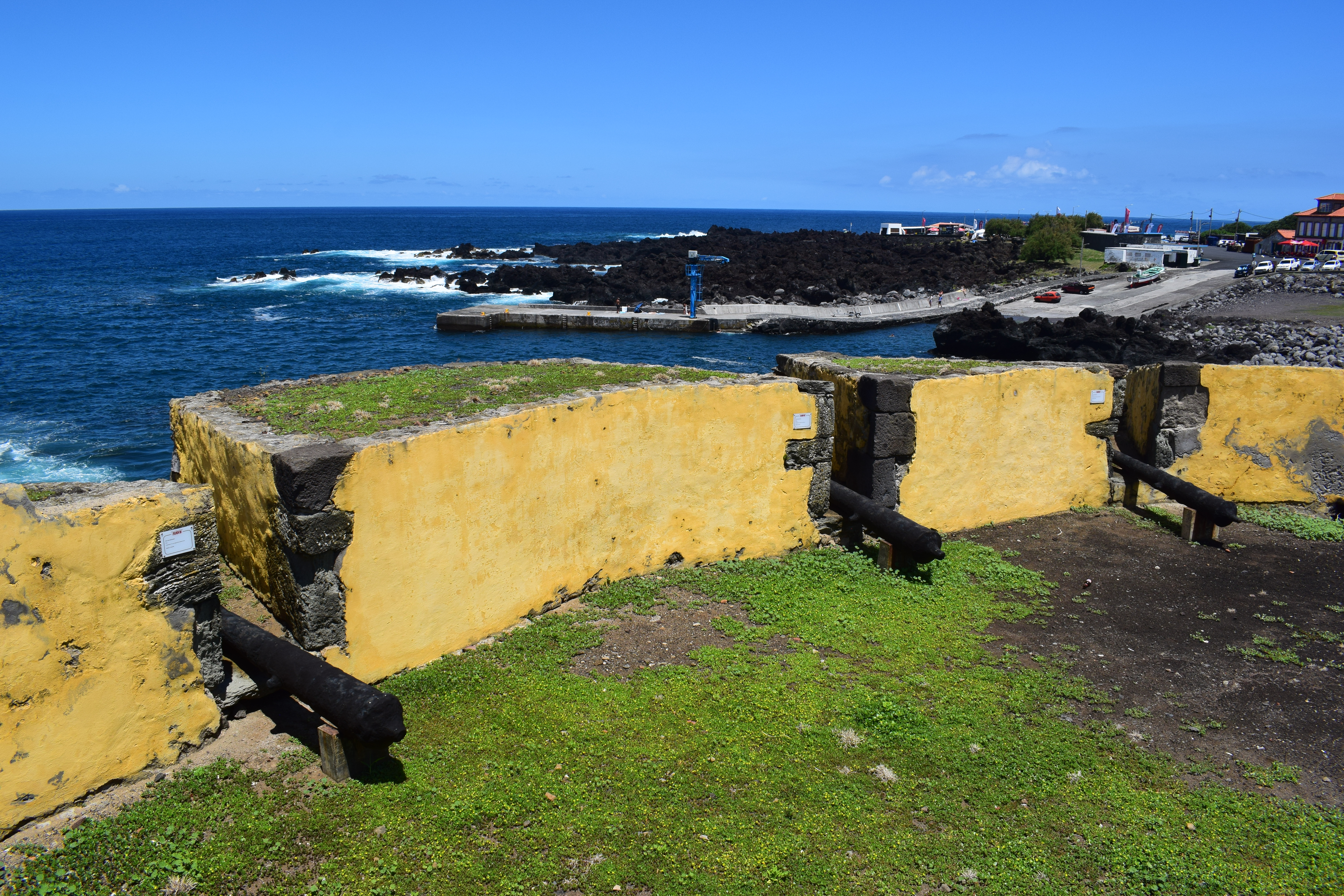
Fort of São Pedros, Terceira

== History ==
The fort was built around 1520 by the "Provider of Fortifications", Pedro Anes do Canto, to defend the anchorage that served not only his land, but also Portuguese ships during the Age of Discovery. It was named in his honour. Although precise information is lacking, it appears that it was rebuilt between 1579 and 1581 during the Portuguese succession crisis by order of the magistrate of the Azores, Ciprião de Figueiredo e Vasconcelos, as part of the island's defence plan.

In the context of the Portuguese Civil War (1828–1834), the fort was subject to reinforcement work in 1828, and began to house a detachment of troops with the function of preventing a possible landing attempt by absolutist forces opposing the liberal constitutionalist regime that was supported by Terceira. At the end of this conflict, it was left unguarded. Some minor repairs were carried out in 1862, because it was considered to be the area with the best chance on the north coast of the island for enemy forces to land.

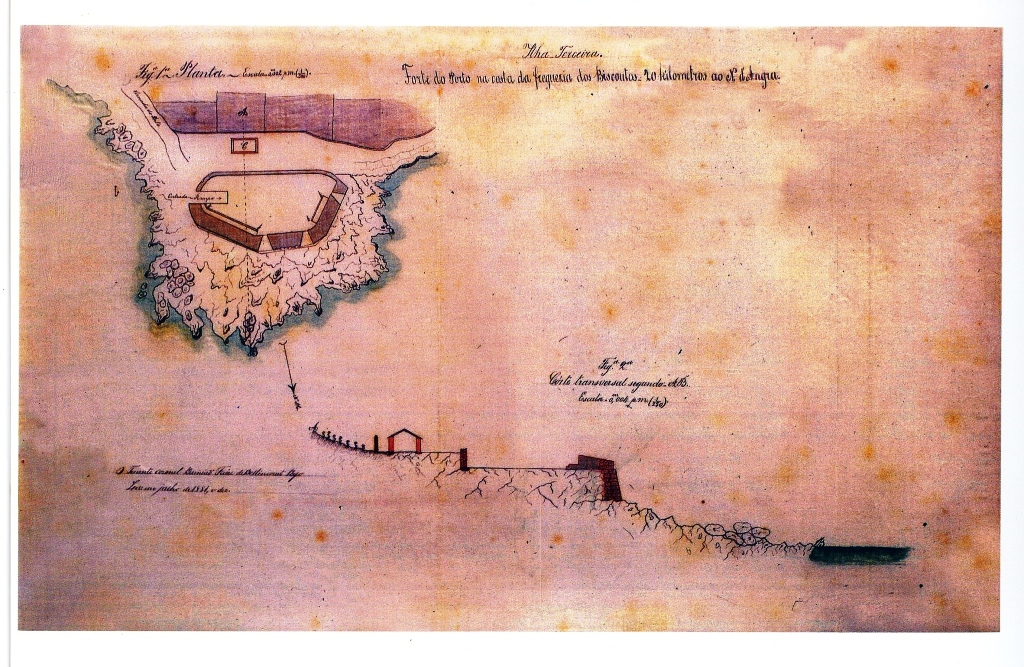
Plan prepared by Damião Pego in 1881

In 1881 the fort was reported as being abandoned and partially ruined, with the garrison house having been occupied by a fisherman. During World War II, it housed a machine gun emplacement. Today the remains are preserved on the initiative of the Biscoitos Parish Council.

== Characteristics ==
A plan of the fort produced in 1881 by Damião Pego shows it as having an irregular pentagonal plan. The outer walls, built in stone, have three gun emplacements. A house built of masonry with a thatched roof was built separately for the garrison, outside of the fort area.
