= Fort of Rua Longa =

Fort in the Azores, Portugal

- Forte da Rua Longa
- Biscoitos, Terceira Island, Azores in Portugal
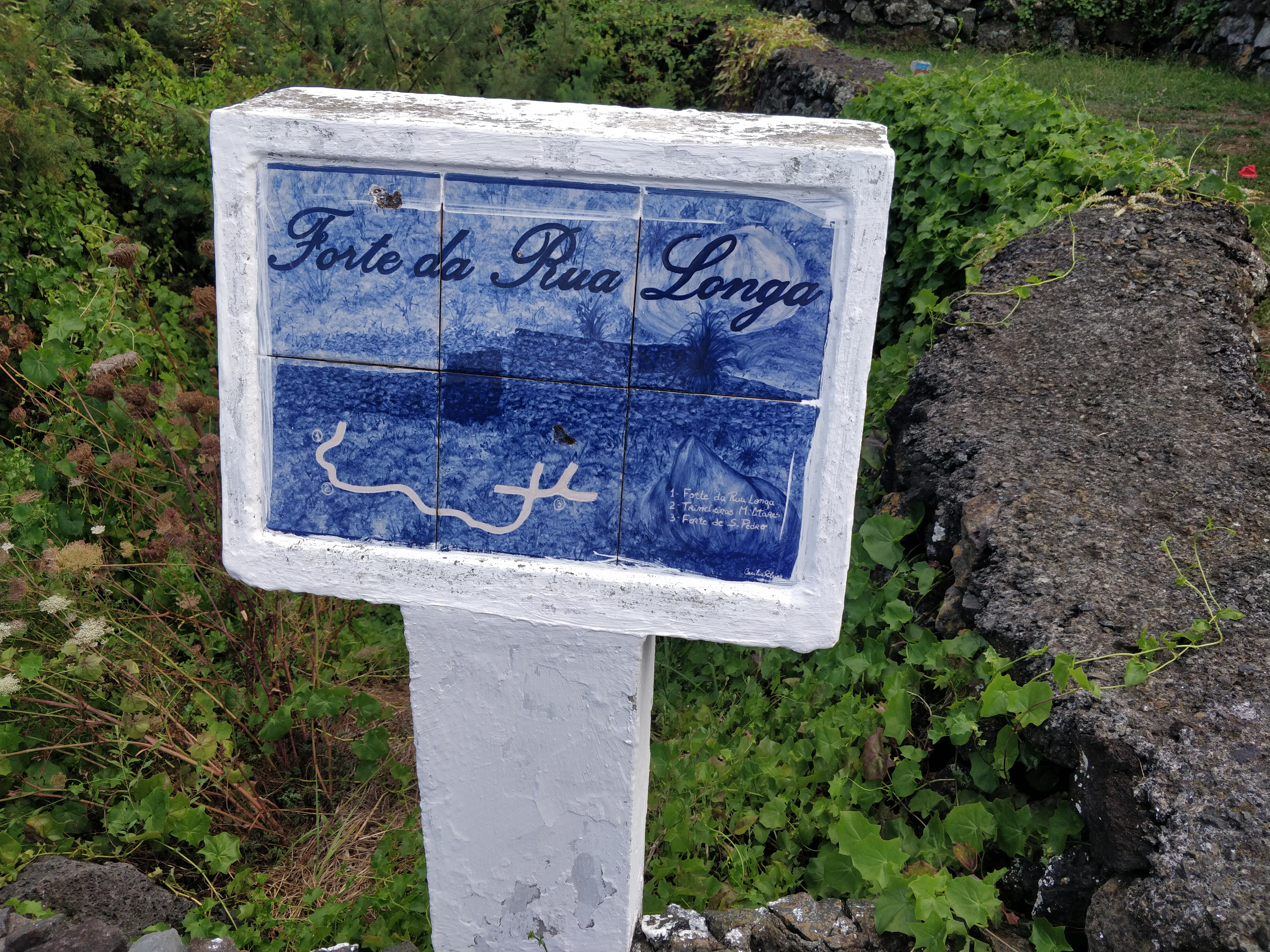

Site information
- Open to the public: Yes.
- Condition: Partly preserved

Location
- Coordinates: 38°47′54″N 27°14′46″W

Site history
- Built: Unknown, probably 16th-century
- Built by: Pedro Anes do Canto
- Battles/wars: Unknown

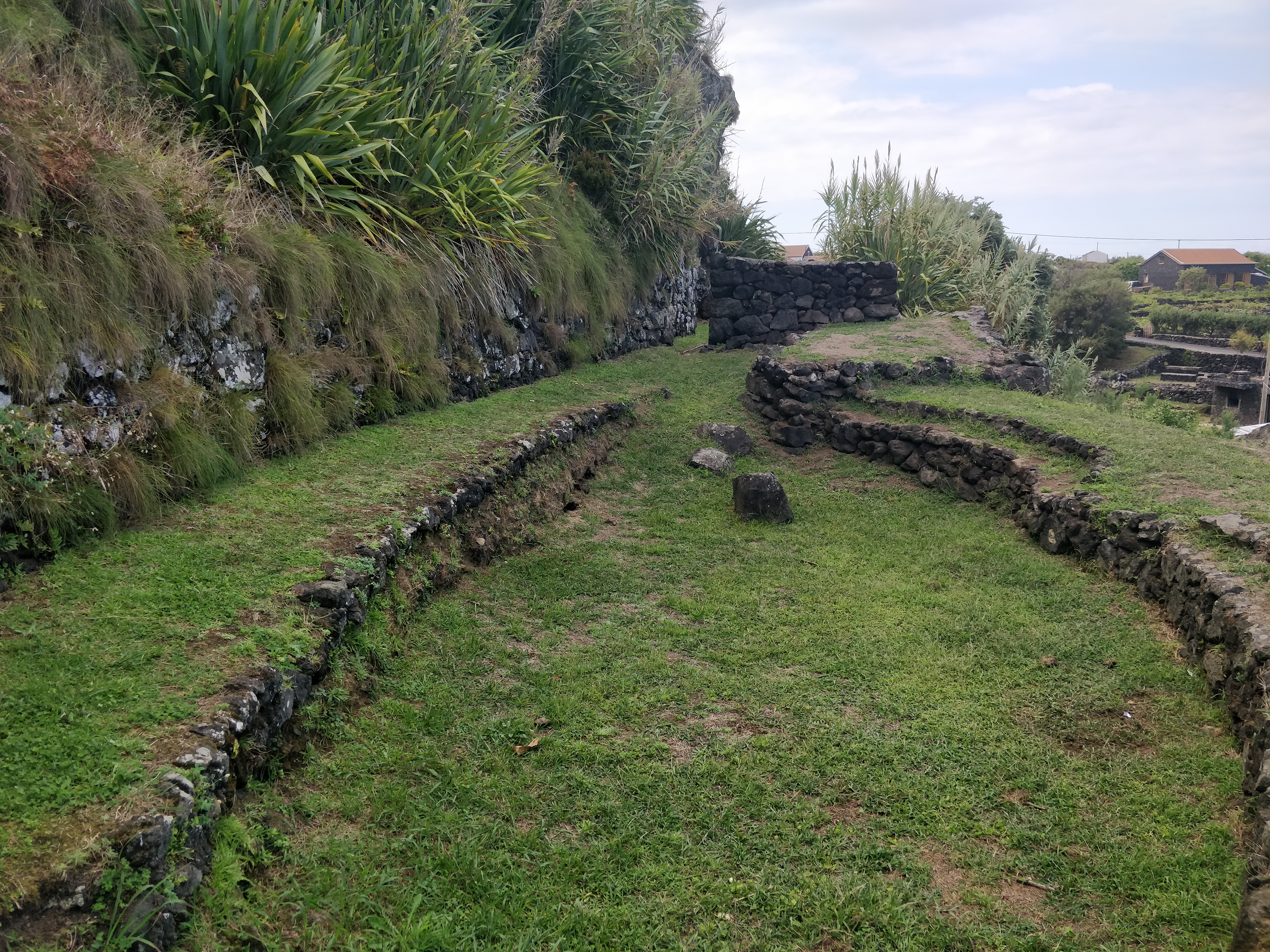
View of the fort

The Fort of Rua Longa was located in the Rolo bay or cove in the parish of Biscoitos, municipality of Praia da Vitória, on the north coast of Terceira Island, in the Azores. In a dominant position over this stretch of coastline, it was designed to defend the anchorage against attacks by pirates and privateers, which were once common in this region. It crosses fire with the Fort of São Pedro a short distance to the west.

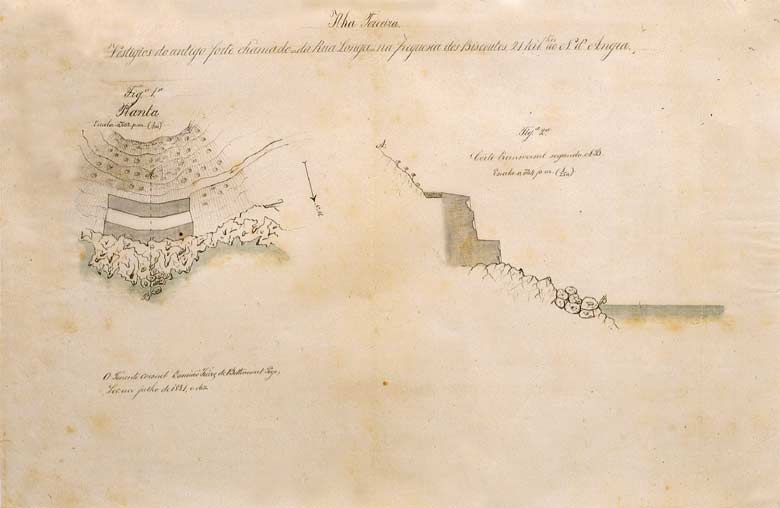
1881 plan of the fort

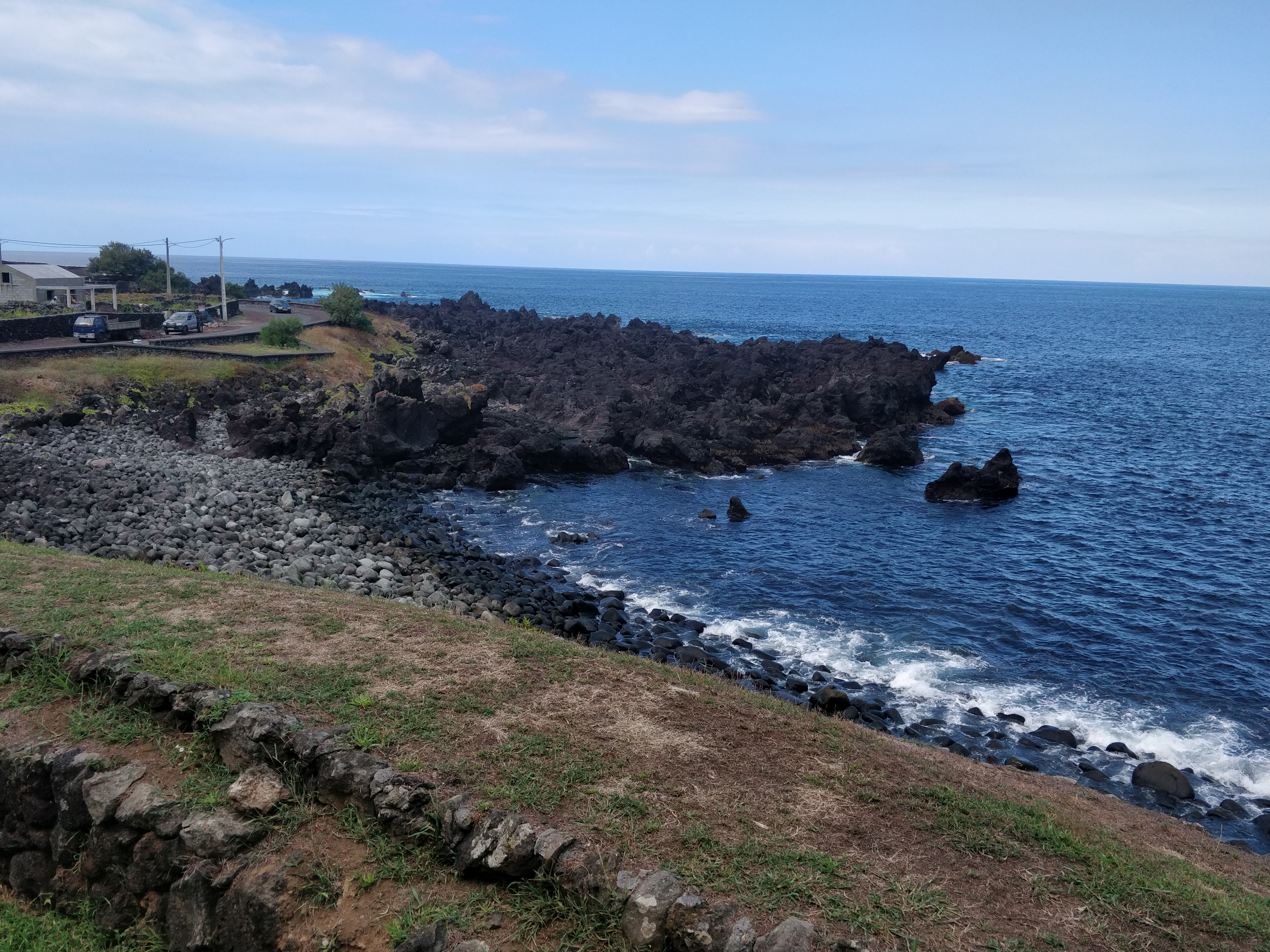
The fort had a commanding view of the Atlantic Ocean

== History ==
Little is unfortunately known about the fort’s construction or development. The assumption is that it was constructed by Pedro Anes do Canto, a large landowner in Biscoitos, who was responsible for the São Pedro fort, which was named after him, in order to cover the other possible landing area in Biscoitos. A review of forts carried out by Field Marshal Baron de Bastos in 1862 notes that the fort had been unfit for many years, stating that "It is simply a work of earth, built on private property, and should only be rebuilt when circumstances require it". Its present restored condition does, however, show considerable stonework. During World War II, it housed a machine gun nest. The ruins of a small house at its entrance must also be related to the work carried out during that conflict, since this building is not included in an 1898 plan.

Slightly to the north of the fort are World War II defences in the form of trenches cut into the volcanic rock by the sea.

== Characteristics ==
An 1881 survey by Pego and Almeida shows that it was a small fortification, although the plan did not indicate the existence of gun emplacements, service buildings or parapets for rifle fire. It is possible that in the years immediately following it underwent some work, as a plan dated 1898 shows two gun emplacements.
