= Altares =

- Civil parish
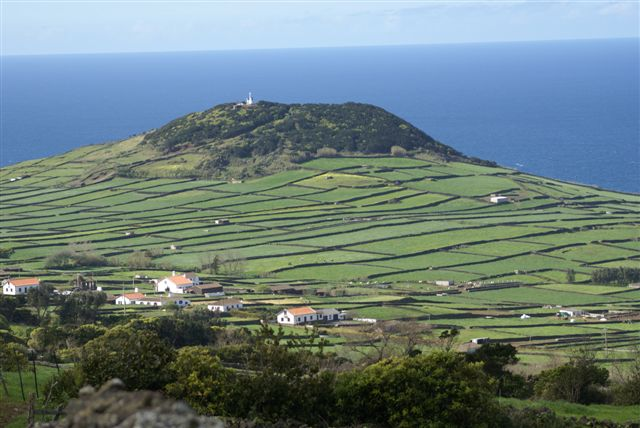
- Pico Matias Simão an ancient volcanic spatter cone located near the coast of Altares

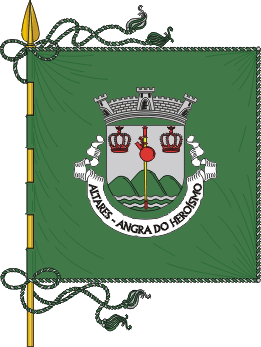
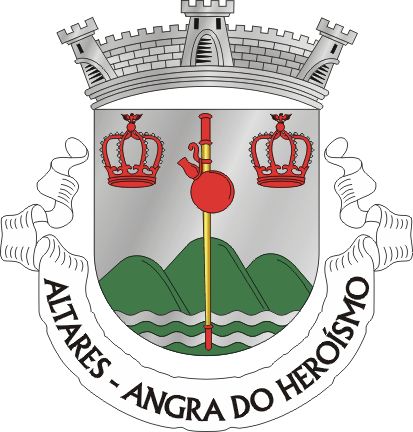
- Flag Coat of arms

- Location of the civil parish in Terceira
- Coordinates: 38°47′27″N 27°17′57″W
- Country: Portugal
- Auton. region: Azores
- Island: Terceira
- Municipality: Angra do Heroísmo
- Established: Settlement: c. 1480

Area
  - Total: 28.22 km^{2} (10.90 sq mi)
- Elevation: 132 m (433 ft)

Population (2011)
  - Total: 901
  - Density: 31.9/km^{2} (82.7/sq mi)
- Time zone: UTC−01:00 (AZOT)
  - Summer (DST): UTC+00:00 (AZOST)
- Postal code: 9700-306
- Area code: 295 9XX XXX
- Patron: São Roque
- Website: http://www.jfaltares.pt/

Altares (pronounced [ɐɫ.ˈta.ɾɨʃ]) is a freguesia ("civil parish") in the municipality of Angra do Heroísmo on the Portuguese island of Terceira in the archipelago of the Azores. The population in 2011 was 901, in an area of 28.22 km^{2}.

== History ==
Situated on relatively flat land with fertile soils, although situated far from major population centres, the region was settled early, sometime before the year 1480. Owing to the severity of the coast, access to this region was obtained from the port of Biscoitos, some 6 kilometres (3.7 mi) east, and from the early settlement along the ravines of Quatro Ribeiras. The clearing and logging that proceeded along the territory, and from the agrarian structure and morphology of the land, settlement must have progressed from east to west, until the parish of Raminho (which was then known as Folhadais) was last to be settled.

Due to the island's date of colonization and the progress of settlement along the north, the first occupation occurred around 1460, resulting in the foundation by the end of the 15th century. The fertility of the soils supported the establishment of agriculture and woad commerce (today remembered in the name of the Canada dos Engenhos) which helped establish the wealth of many of the Terceirense families. Referring to agriculture in Altares, Gaspar Frutuoso affirmed:

Until the Church of São Roque the land is flat, almost half a league from the square, and weak, providing little wheat and much, thin woad, that which has the lowest price among all the others, to have mixed "bagacina", almost like pumice; pastel costs little to do and less weeding for the land give little grass.

By the middle of the 15th century, the first important settlers arrived on the island, such as João Valadão, Gonçalo Álvares Pamplona (founder of Arrochela), Manuel Borges da Costa (descendant of João Borges "The Older", one of the first inhabitants on the island) and João Álvares Homem (relative of Álvaro Martins Homem), founder of the city of Angra. One of João Valadão daughters married Martim Simão (later identified with the toponymy of the parish, for example Pico de Matias Simão or Pico de Martim Simão).

It is unclear when the settlement was elevated to the status of parish, but it may have occurred before 1480, associated with a reference to a parish priest. The limits of the parish were relatively undefined, but included the northwest of the island, from Fajã (today an uninhabited site below Mata da Serreta and territory in the parish of Serreta) to the locality of Ponta Negra, including a part of Arrochela (today part of Biscoitos).

The centre of the parish, dominated by parochial church, was founded on the margins of the Ribeira de São Roque, in the immediate confluence of the Ribeira das Lajinhas, an area covered in vegetation and dominated by a large, evergreen bog. The settlement was supported by ravines and natural springs that ran from the mountainous Serra de Santa Bárbara, some 4 kilometres (2.5 mi) from the settlement.

== Geography ==
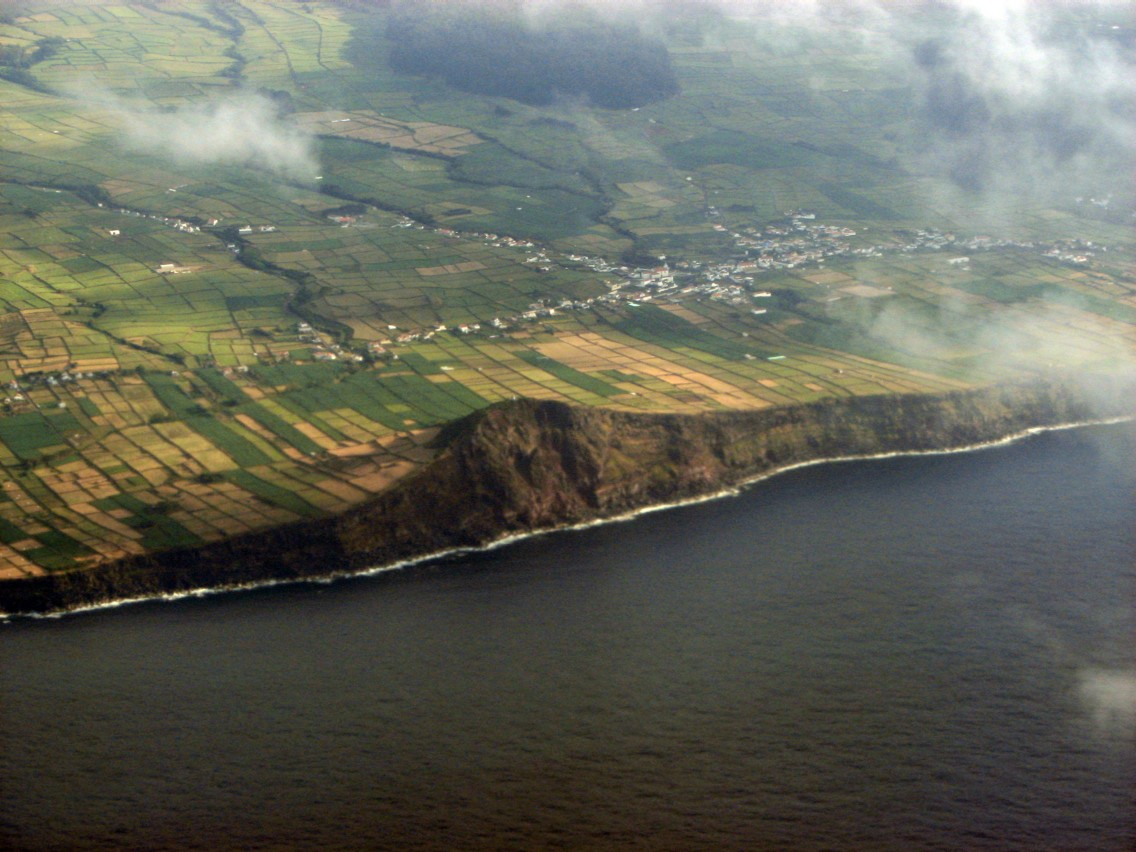
Seaside farms in Altares

The parish is located in the northwestern part of the island, about 19 kilometres from the city of Angra do Heroísmo. It is bounded on the east by the parish of Biscoitos, which belongs to the municipality of Praia da Vitória, on the west by the parish of Raminho, on the north by the Atlantic Ocean, and on the south and southwest by the caldera of the Santa Bárbara volcano and by the parish also called Santa Bárbara.

Altares is located along the northern flanks of the Serra de Santa Bárbara massif, extending from the northern and western edges of the caldera of Santa Barbara volcano to the seaside cliffs on the north coast of the island. Topographically, the civil parish is bounded on the east by the course of the Ribeira do Pamplona (Pamplona Ravine), which also serves as the border to the municipality of Angra do Heroísmo, and on the west by a line drawn from the 827 metres (2,713 ft) summit of Pico Rachado to the sea. This line follows the course of the Ribeira dos Gatos (Ravine of the Cats), but then it diverts to the west to include the hamlet of Cerro da Ribeira dos Gatos, a ridge of hills and miscellaneous buildings.

The territory of the parish rises gradually from the coast, first as a relatively gentle slope, but at an increasingly rugged grade as one approaches the heights of the Serra de Santa Bárbara, where five streams have their sources: the Riberia dos Gatos, the Ribeira de São Roque, the Ribeira das Lajinhas, the Ribeira da Lapa, and the Ribeira do Pamplona. Although crossed by various river courses, the parish is actually poor in hydrographic resources, since surface water is intermittent. In fact, ravine water is primarily from intense precipitation in the foothills, lasting a short time normally. This was not the case during the period of early colonization, since the forest and tuber vegetation would regulate waterflow, resulting in light continuously flowing streams throughout the year. From east to west, the following ravines are the primarily affluent in the parish:

- Ribeira do Pamplona, apart from delimiting the parish, it is also the frontier of Angra do Heroísmo;
- Ribeira de Lapa, one of the more intensely flowing watercourses;
- Ribeira da Luz;
- Ribeira de São Roque, alongside the parochial church (in the centre of the parish), and to its left the Ribeira das Lajinhas;
- Ribeira dos Gatos

== Architecture ==
=== Religious ===
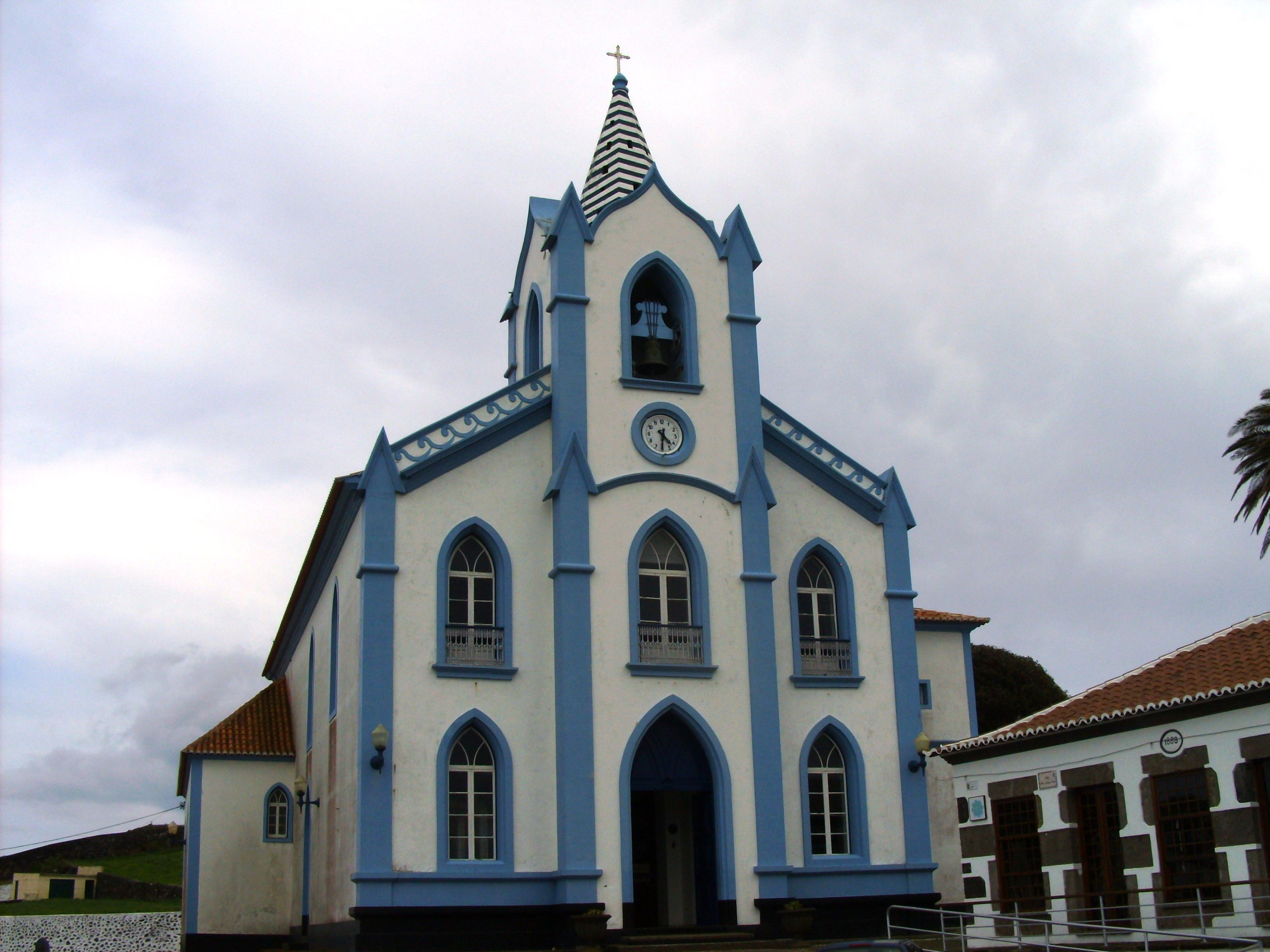
The single-nave parochial Church of São Roque dating to the 15th century

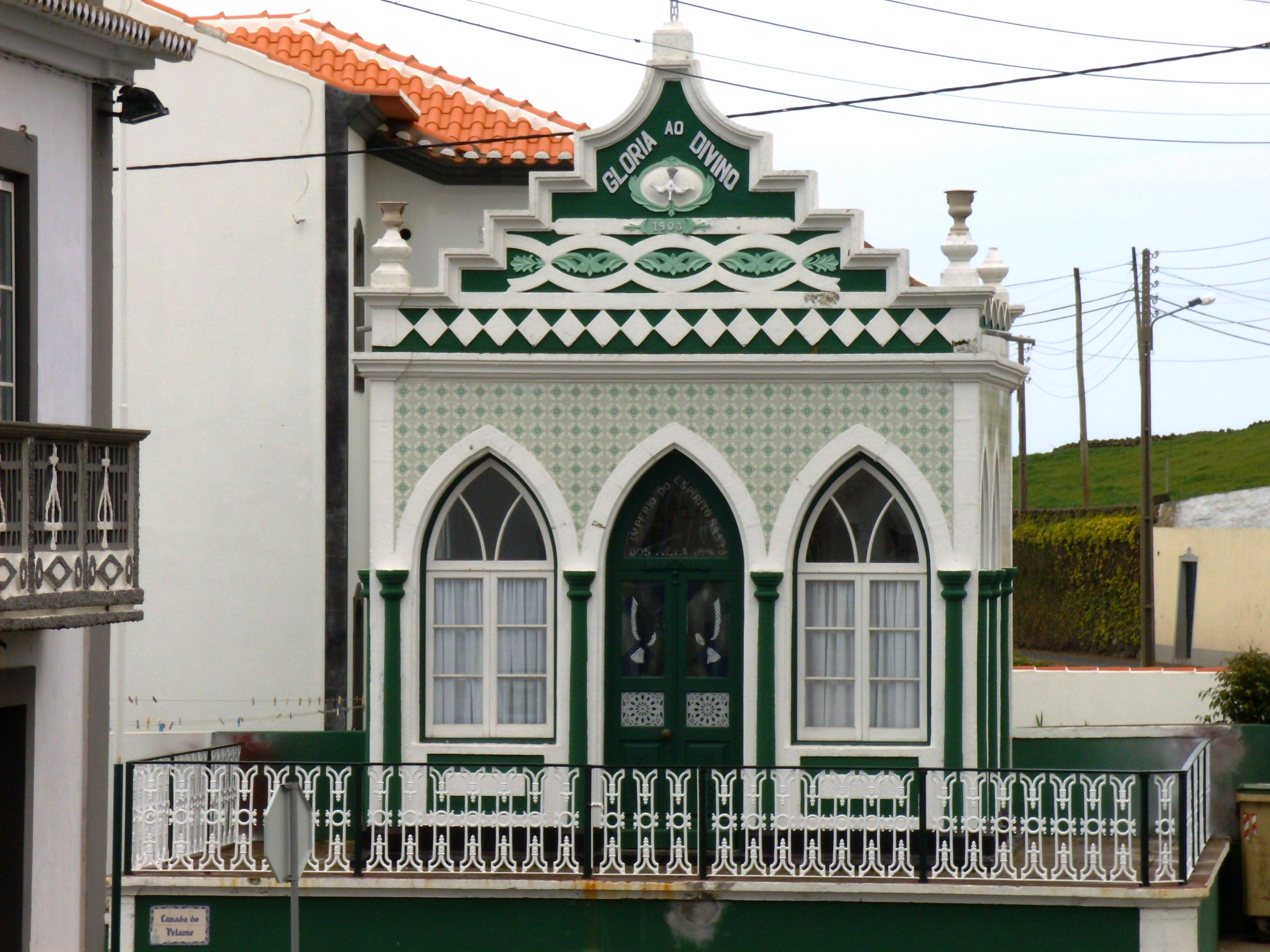
The Império of the Holy Spirit, a modern império used in religious celebrations annually

For many years after settlement, small nuclei coalesced around the roadways parallel the coast dominated by chapels and hermitages, transforming into centre of the religious cults: the Hermitage of Santa Catarina of the Pamplona family (constructed in 1525) centre of the locality of Arrochela; the Hermitage of São Mateus situated in Outeiro de São Mateus and pilgrim church during the 16th century, a hermitage erected in 1530, by Margarida Valadão, daughter of João Valadão); the Hermitage of Nossa Senhora da Luz, situated in Achadas, along the margins of Ribeira da Luz (where today stands a Marian niche), that pertained to the Pereira family of Faial, who hand lands here; and the Hermitage of Mãe de Deus, in Folhadais, today the parochial Church of São Francisco Xavier of Raminho. Most of these hermitages have since been abandoned and disappeared from the landscape, although (in 1843), Jerónimo Emiliano de Andrade affirmed the existence of many of the hermitages.

Today these religious structures have been classified as national patrimony:

- Church of São Roque (Igreja Paroquial de Altares/Igreja de São Roque), the parochial single-nave church, dedicated to Saint Roch, was completed in the 15th century, and is located on an elevated terrain occupied along with the parochial school, Museu Etnográfico dos Altares, with an important collection of instruments associated with agriculture and traditional Azorean activities (including exhibition of flora, fauna and ecologia of Terceira).
- Império of the Holy Spirit of Altares (Império do Espírito Santo de Altares), dating to the early 20th century, the single-room rectangular building is used the festivals associated the Cult of the Holy Spirit held annually by the Brotherhood of the Holy Spirit; it is a highly decorated facade with three gothic-style windows and door, and triangular frontispiece, but also includes annex when the events of the festivals extends.
