= Watermill of Agualva =

- Azenha da Ribeira da Agualva
- Location of the watermill on the island of Terceira

General information
- Type: Watermill
- Architectural style: Medieval
- Location: Agualva, Praia da Vitória, Portugal
- Coordinates: 38°47′14.11″N 27°10′12.69″W
- Opened: 18th century

Technical details
- Material: Basalt

The Watermill of Agualva (Portuguese: Azenha da Ribeira da Agualva) is a watermill located in the civil parish of Vila Nova, in the municipality of Praia da Vitoria, island of Terceira, in the Portuguese Azores. It is part of the inventory of historical and religious buildings registered as an Inventário do Património Imóvel dos Açores (English: Inventory of Heritage Buildings of the Azores) dating back to the eighteenth century.

== Architecture ==
Its designation as a buildings of historical significance includes two structures: a watermill/home, and an ancillary building, at one time used as a barn, located along the right margin of the Ribeira da Agualva and roadway. The watermill/house is a two-story structure, with only the residential floor visible from street-level, with an outdoor oven (constructed in a semi-circular shape) and rectangular chimney (on the left-side of the building). This simple structure was built from local volcanic rock and stone from other ruins, and painted lime white. The spans are composed of curved wicker, and the windows are guillotine-style single-pain double-hung sash. The roof is covered in traditional Azorean half-cane roof tiles with a simple awning. One of the exterior walls shows signs of the watermill's function, and site of the waterwheel.

To the left of the main house/watermill is a simple rectangular building of one floor, used as barn (now garage or storage) of the same material as the main house (no windows, but with the same rock/stone construction and roof tile). At one time it is likely that this building was used to house domesticated animals or storage of hay.

While the building is in reasonable condition, its use as a mill and associated mechanisms have been removed. Still remains an iconic example of this type of structure, common in the Azores until the late 19th century.
