= Serra de Santa Bárbara =

Peak of a dormant volcano in the Azores, Portugal

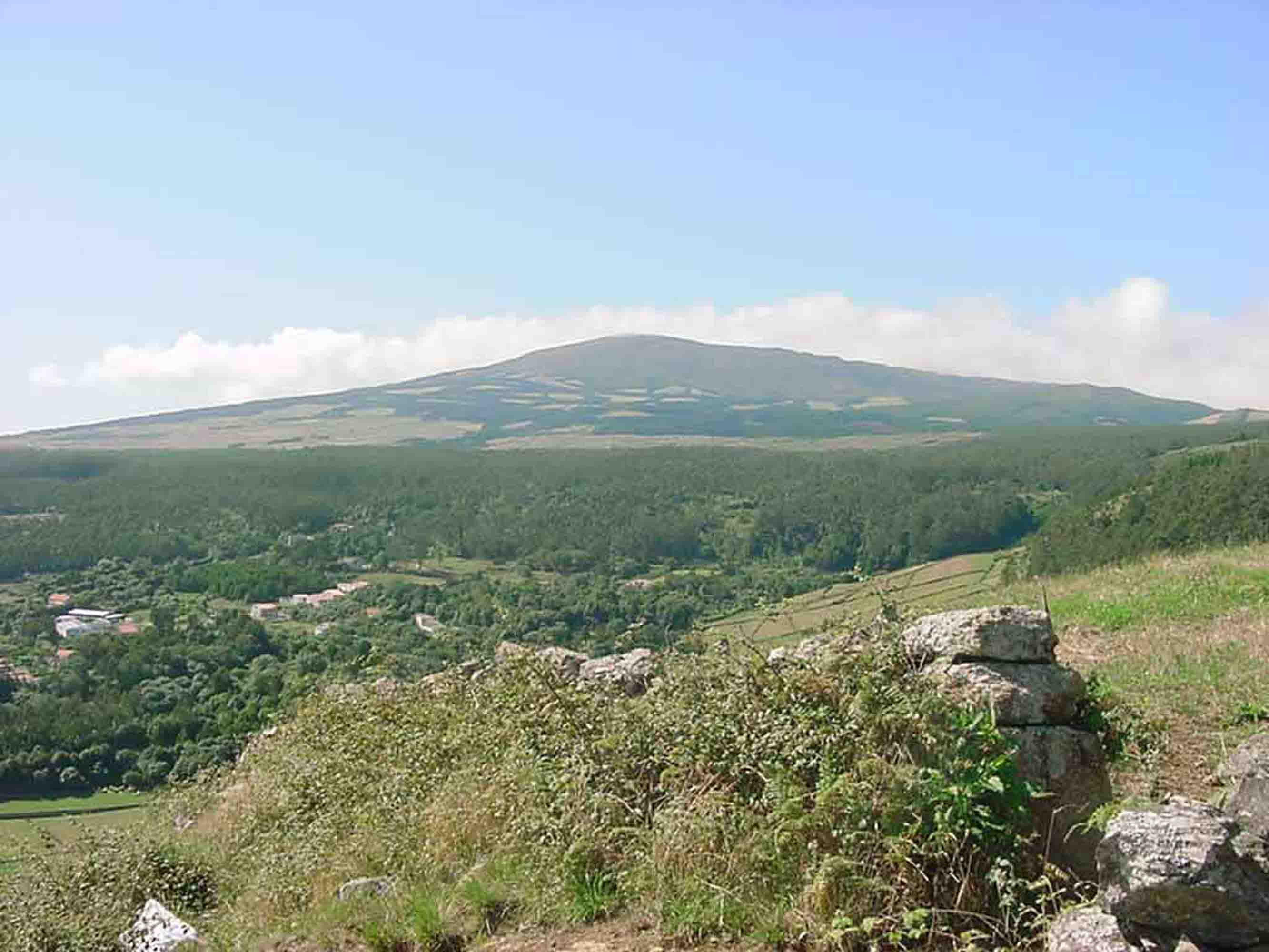
- Serra de Santa Bárbara from the south

Highest point
- Elevation: 1,021 m (3,350 ft)
- Prominence: 1,021 m (3,350 ft)
- Listing: Ribu
- Coordinates: 38°44′31″N 27°19′09″W

Geography
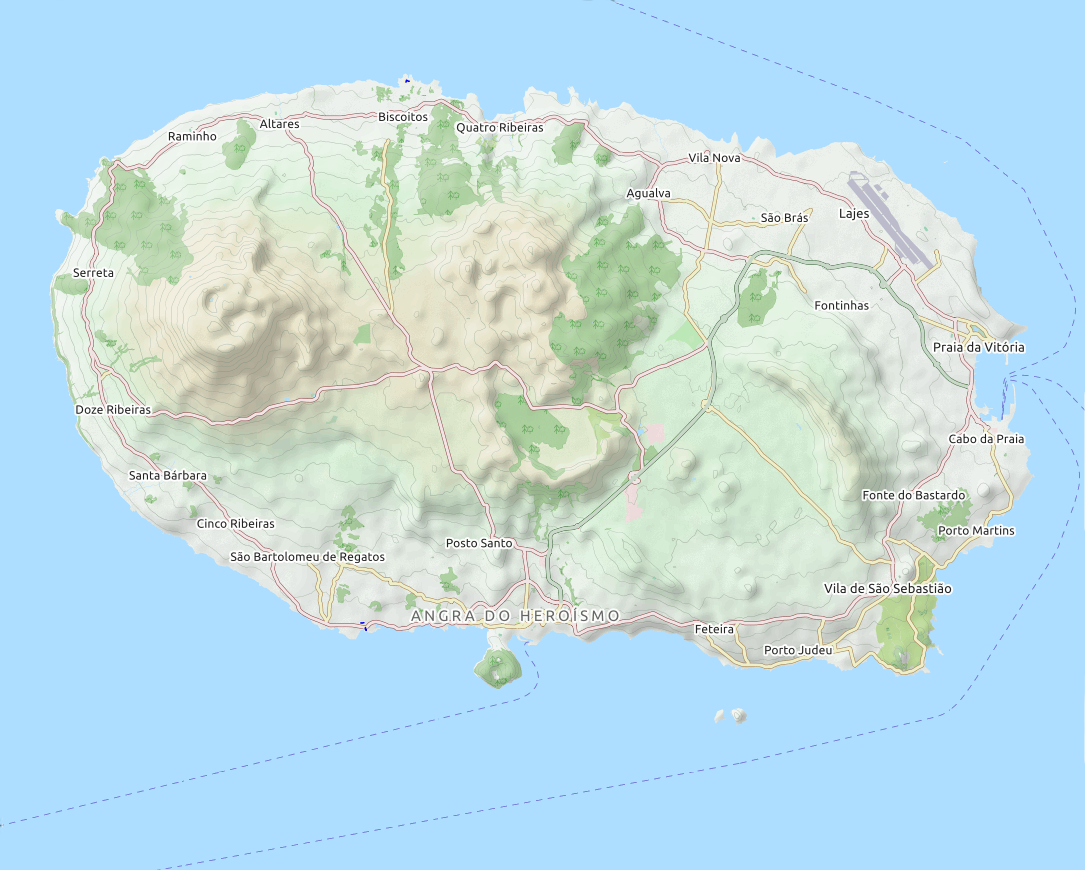
- Location within Terceira
- Location: Terceira Island, Azores

Geology
- Mountain type: Caldera
- Volcanic belt: Mid-Atlantic Ridge
- Last eruption: 2000

Serra de Santa Bárbara is the peak of an dormant volcano in the western part of the island of Terceira, Azores, Portugal. At 1,021 m (3,350 ft) elevation, it is the highest point of the island. It is named after the village located on the coast to the south, Santa Bárbara in the municipality of Angra do Heroísmo.

The peak lies on the south rim of the Santa Barbara Caldera which is approximately one kilometer wide, having two smaller peaks in the center of the caldera. The upper slopes and the floor of the caldera are covered by holly and juniper forests, almost all of which are protected in the Nature Reserve of Serra de Santa Barbara e dos Mistérios Negros.

In 1761 a portion of the volcano erupted, and according to local religious lore, the villagers took a holy relic up to the erupting lava, and the lava stopped.

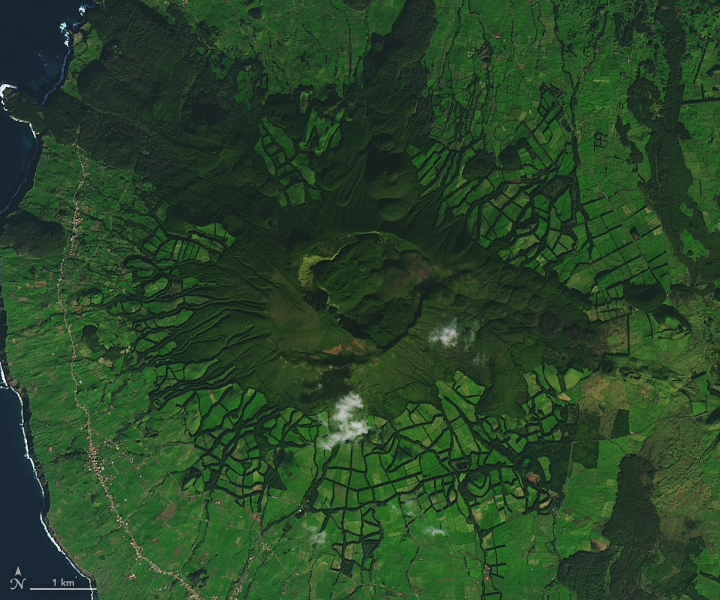
Serra de Santa Bárbara, Terceira 2020. The peak includes a double caldera, which formed from summit collapses 25,000 and 15,000 years ago. Also visible are small lava domes that formed on the eastern flank in 1761 during the last volcanic eruption to occur on land on Terceira. The flanks of the volcano are covered by agricultural fields and pastures. The Azores are famous for the production of wine and tea, as well as cattle, which were brought by settlers in the 15th century.
