= Vila Nova (Praia da Vitória) =

- Civil parish
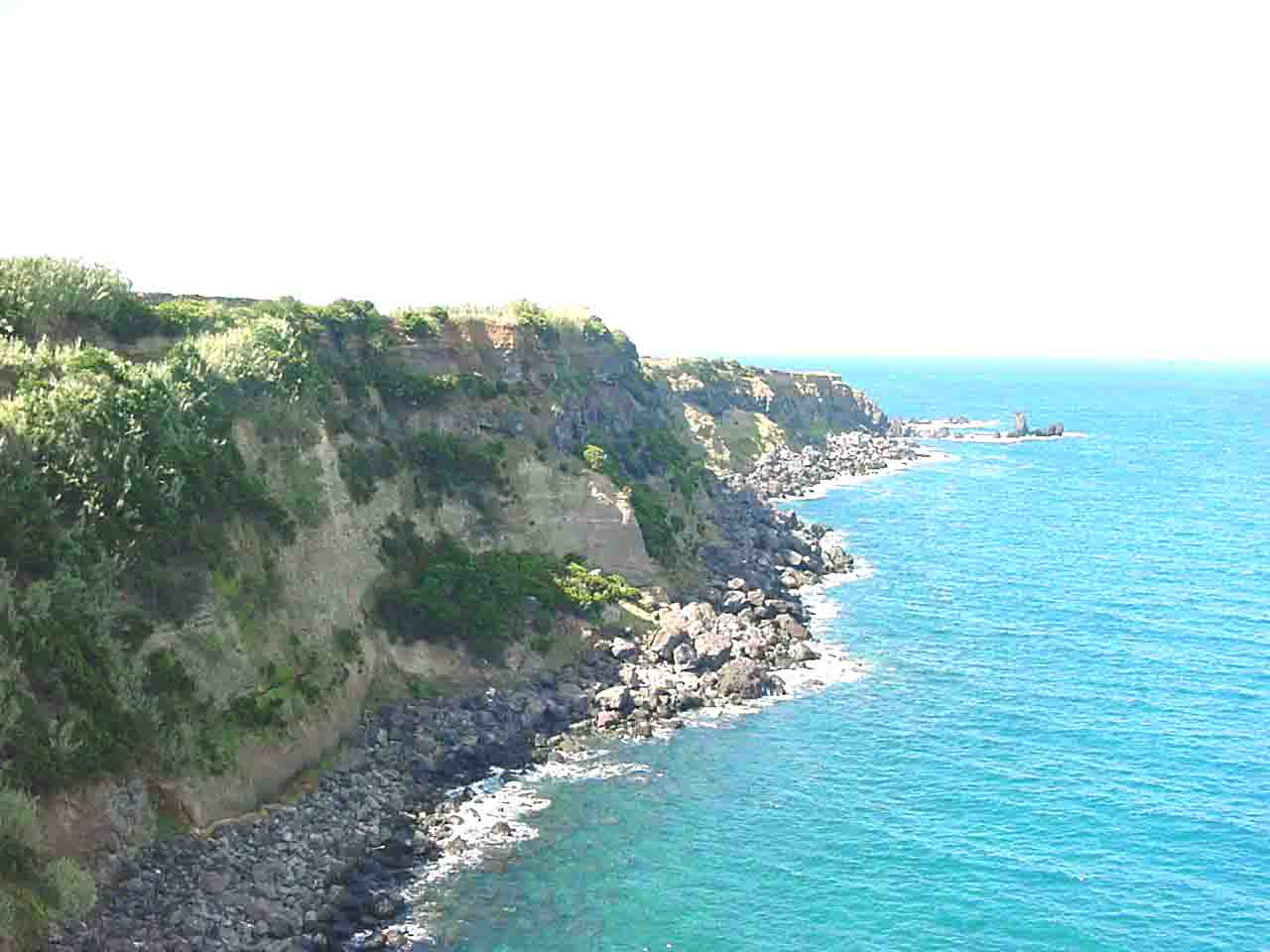
- Praia das Escaleiras, on the northern coast of Vila Nova

- Location in the Azores Vila Nova (Terceira)
- Coordinates: 38°46′51″N 27°8′43″W
- Country: Portugal
- Auton. region: Azores
- Island: Terceira
- Municipality: Praia da Vitória

Area
  - Total: 8.14 km^{2} (3.14 sq mi)
- Elevation: 56 m (184 ft)

Population (2011)
  - Total: 1,678
  - Density: 206/km^{2} (534/sq mi)
- Time zone: UTC−01:00 (AZOT)
  - Summer (DST): UTC+00:00 (AZOST)
- Postal code: 9760-701
- Area code: 292

Vila Nova is a civil parish in the municipality of Praia da Vitória on the island of Terceira in the Portuguese Azores. The population in 2011 was 1,678, in an area of 8.14 km². It contains the localities Alminhas, Canada da Bezerra, Canada da Estaca, Canada do Boqueiro, Faias, Nossa Senhora da Ajuda, Ribeira de Agualva and Vila Nova.

== History ==
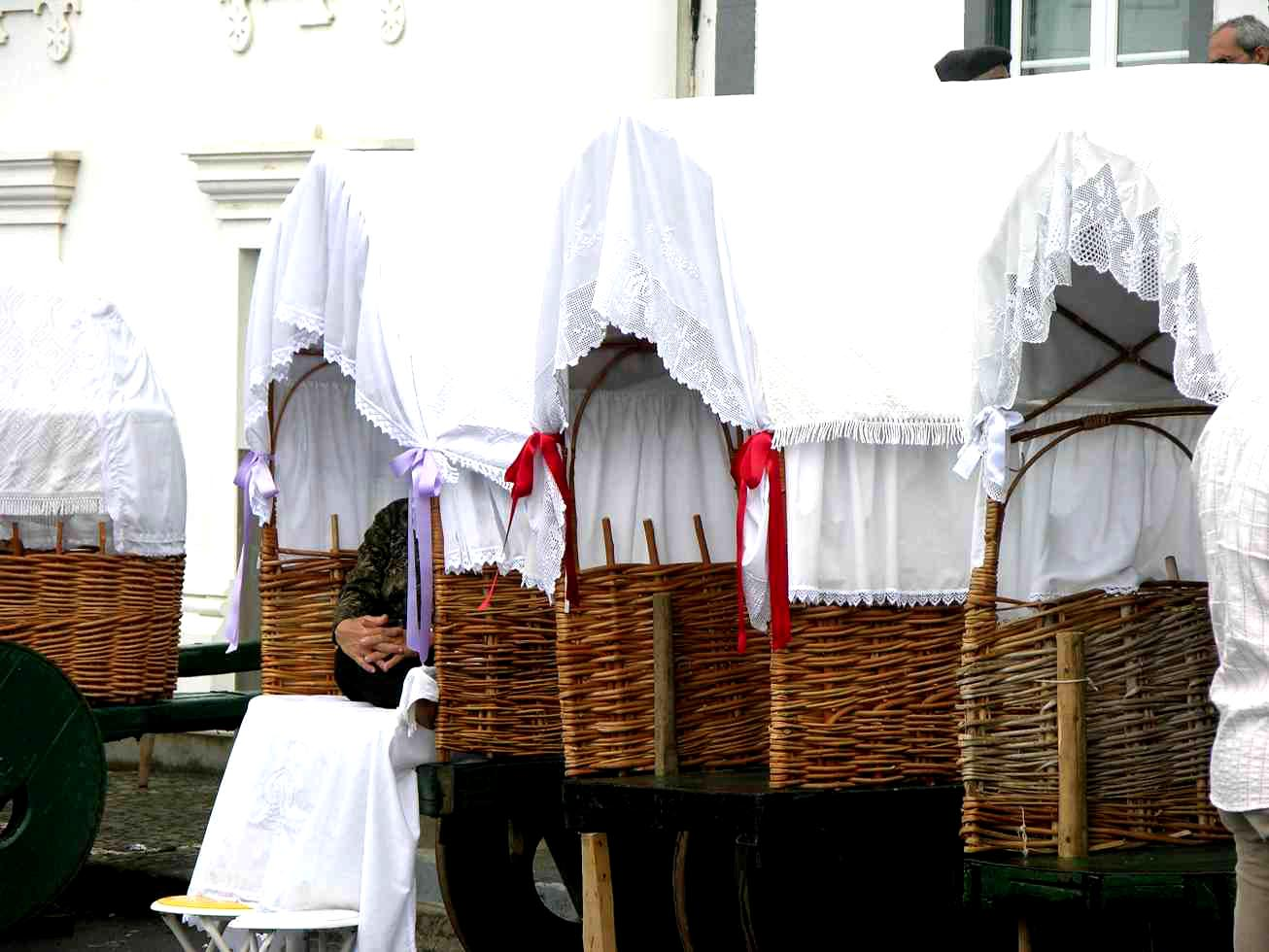
Allegorical carts during the Festas do Espírito Santo in Vila Nova

In its early settlement, the area of Vila Nova was known for its abundance of water; in 1891 there were 14 water fountains supplying potable water to the community. Although primarily a subsistence agriculture community, dominated by the harvesting of cereal crops, the area was also a refuge and settlement for many noble families.

== Geography ==
The area is characterized by rocky coastal zone, that includes the bay and beach of Praia das Escaleiras, and a more elevated area that includes prime agricultural lands in Alminhas, Canada do Boqueiro and Canada da Bezerra.

=== Ecoregions/Protected areas ===
- Praia das Escaleiras
- Calvário

== Architecture ==
=== Civic ===
- Chafariz da Canada da Bezerra
- Chafariz do Pico da Rocha
- Watermill of Agualva (Portuguese: Azenha da Ribeira de Agualva)

=== Religious ===
- Igreja Paroquial do Divino Espírito Santo
- Império do Divino Espírito Santo
- Ermida de Nossa Senhora da Ajuda
