= Raminho =

- Civil parish
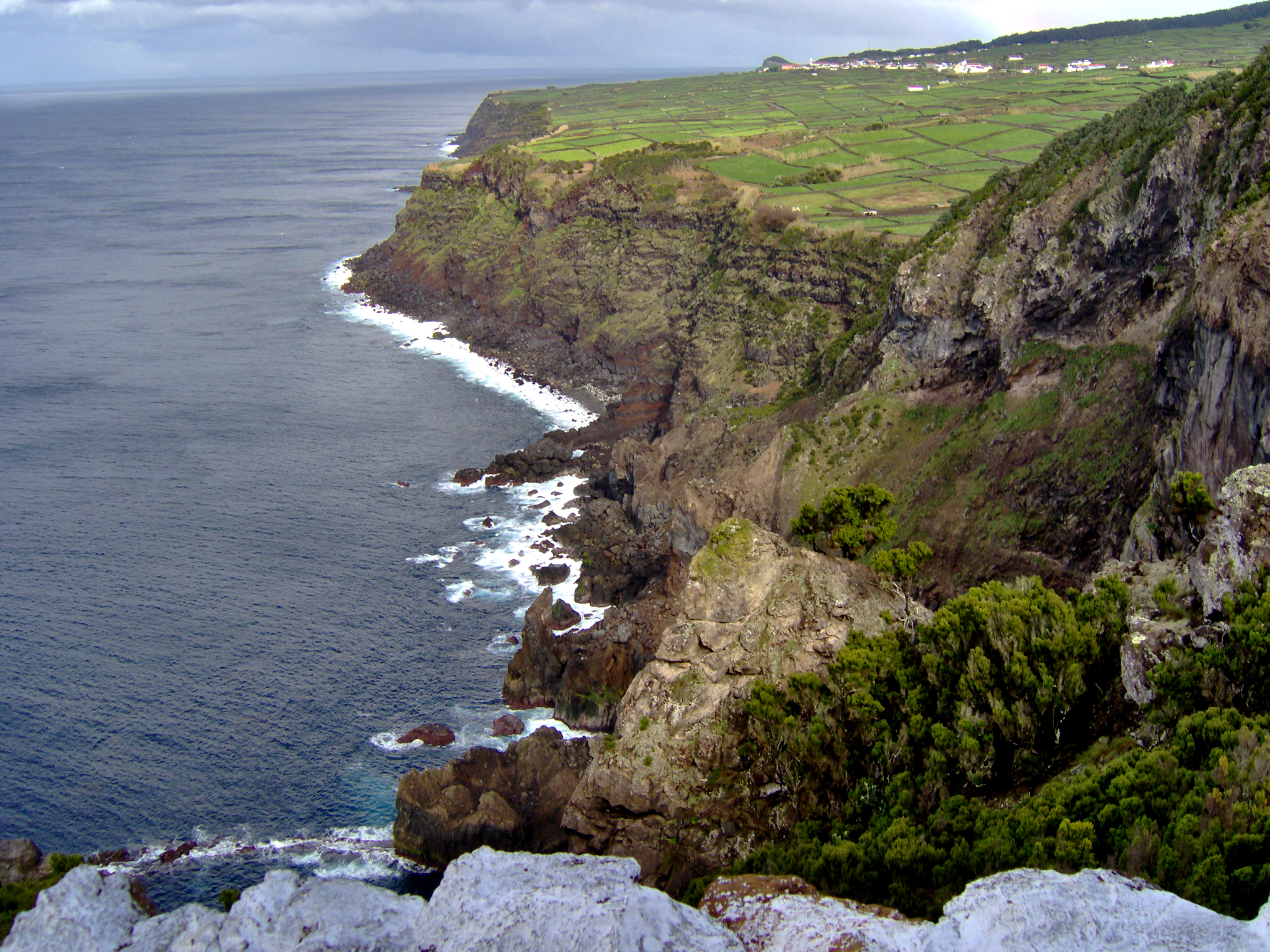
- The cliff faces of the northern coast of Raminho

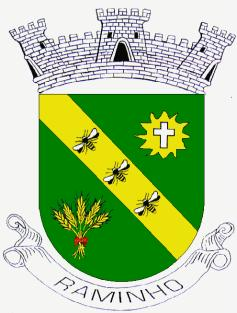
- Coat of arms

- Location in the Azores Raminho (Terceira)
- Coordinates: 38°47′17″N 27°19′48″W
- Country: Portugal
- Auton. region: Azores
- Island: Terceira
- Municipality: Angra do Heroísmo

Area
  - Total: 11.07 km^{2} (4.27 sq mi)
- Elevation: 126 m (413 ft)

Population (2011)
  - Total: 565
  - Density: 51.0/km^{2} (132/sq mi)
- Time zone: UTC−01:00 (AZOT)
  - Summer (DST): UTC+00:00 (AZOST)
- Postal code: 9700 - 401
- Area code: 292
- Patron: São Francisco Xavier
- Website: www.raminho.org

Raminho (pronounced [ʁɐ.ˈmi.ɲu]) is a parish in the municipality of Angra do Heroísmo on the island of Terceira in the Azores. The population in 2011 was 565, in an area of 11.07 km^{2} (4.27 sq mi). It consists of the localities Cabo do Raminho and Raminho.
