= Biscoitos =

- Civil parish
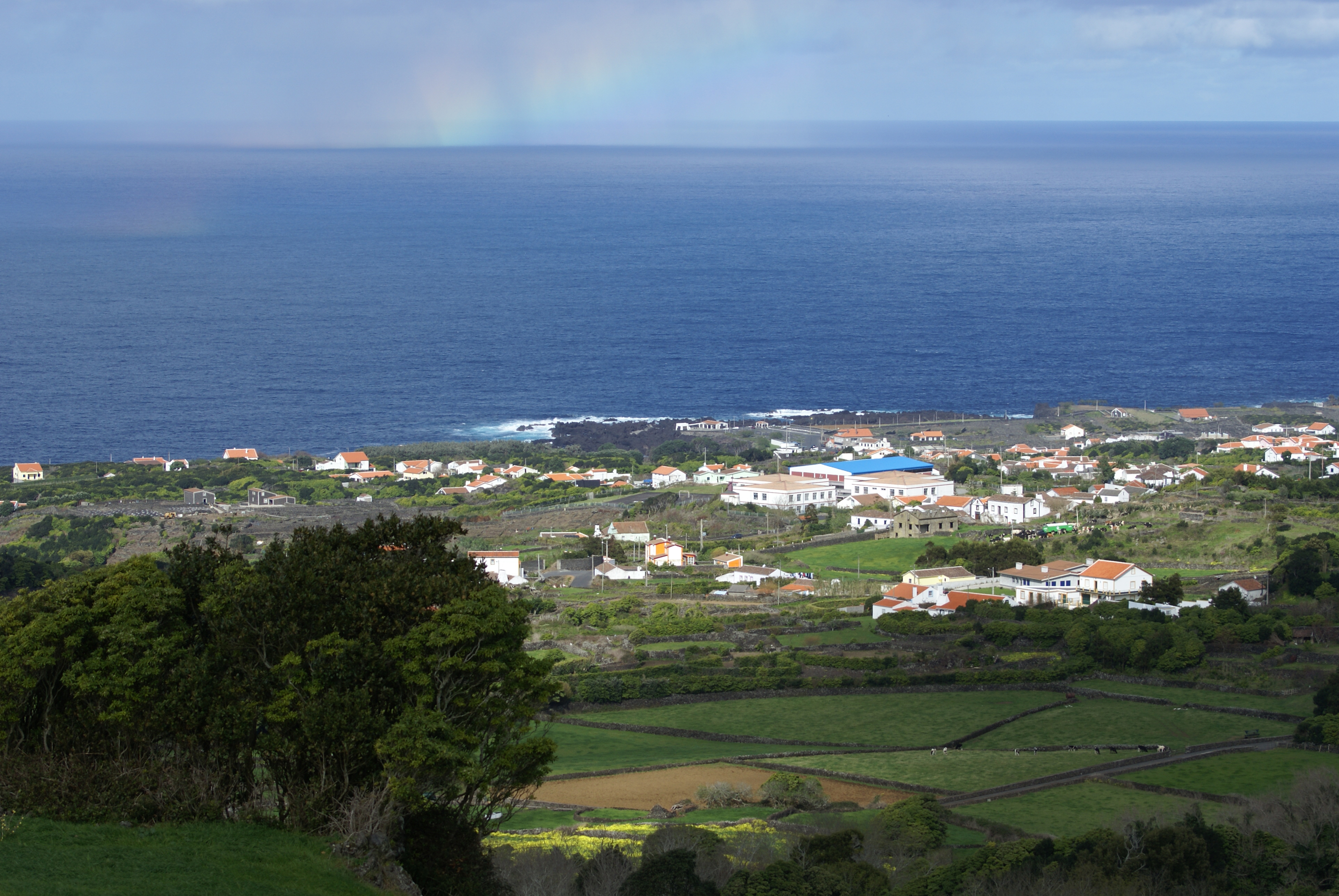
- Partial vista of the residential homes of Biscoitos along the coast

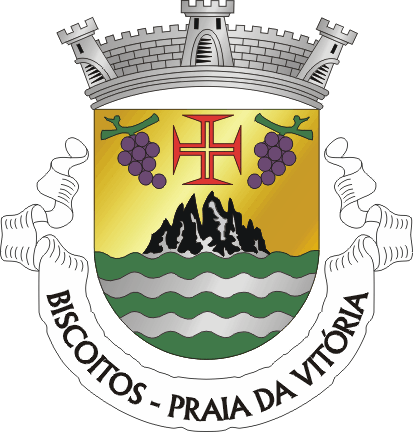
- Coat of arms

- Location in the Azores Biscoitos (Terceira)
- Coordinates: 38°47′32″N 27°15′32″W
- Country: Portugal
- Auton. region: Azores
- Island: Terceira
- Municipality: Praia da Vitória

Area
  - Total: 27.05 km^{2} (10.44 sq mi)
- Elevation: 71 m (233 ft)

Population (2011)
  - Total: 1,424
  - Density: 52.64/km^{2} (136.3/sq mi)
- Time zone: UTC−01:00 (AZOT)
  - Summer (DST): UTC+00:00 (AZOST)
- Postal code: 9760-051
- Area code: 292
- Patron: São Pedro

Biscoitos is a civil parish in the municipality of Praia da Vitória, on the island of Terceira in the Portuguese Azores. The population in 2011 was 1,424, in an area of 27.05 km^{2}.

Due to its volcanic origin, its terrain is poor, so vines were and still are a very usual crop, so Biscoitos began to be known for its high quality wine, which is made with Verdelho grapes.

The village has a wine museum called the Museu do Vinho dos Biscoitos that was established in 1990.
