= Terceira Island =

Island in the Azores archipelago

Terceira
Native name: Ilha Terceira
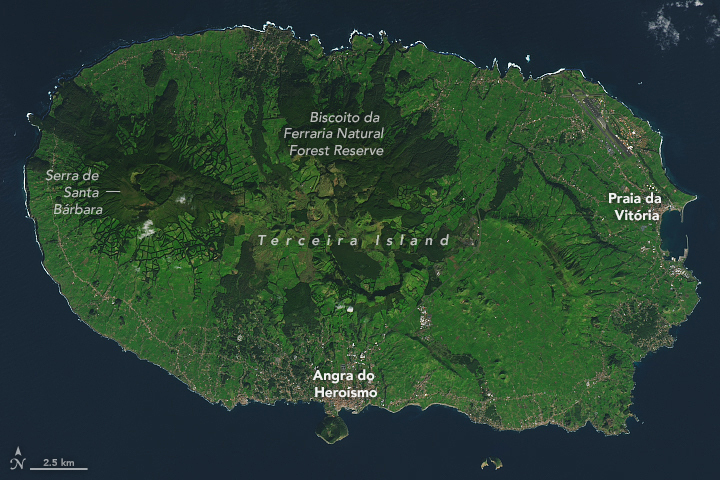

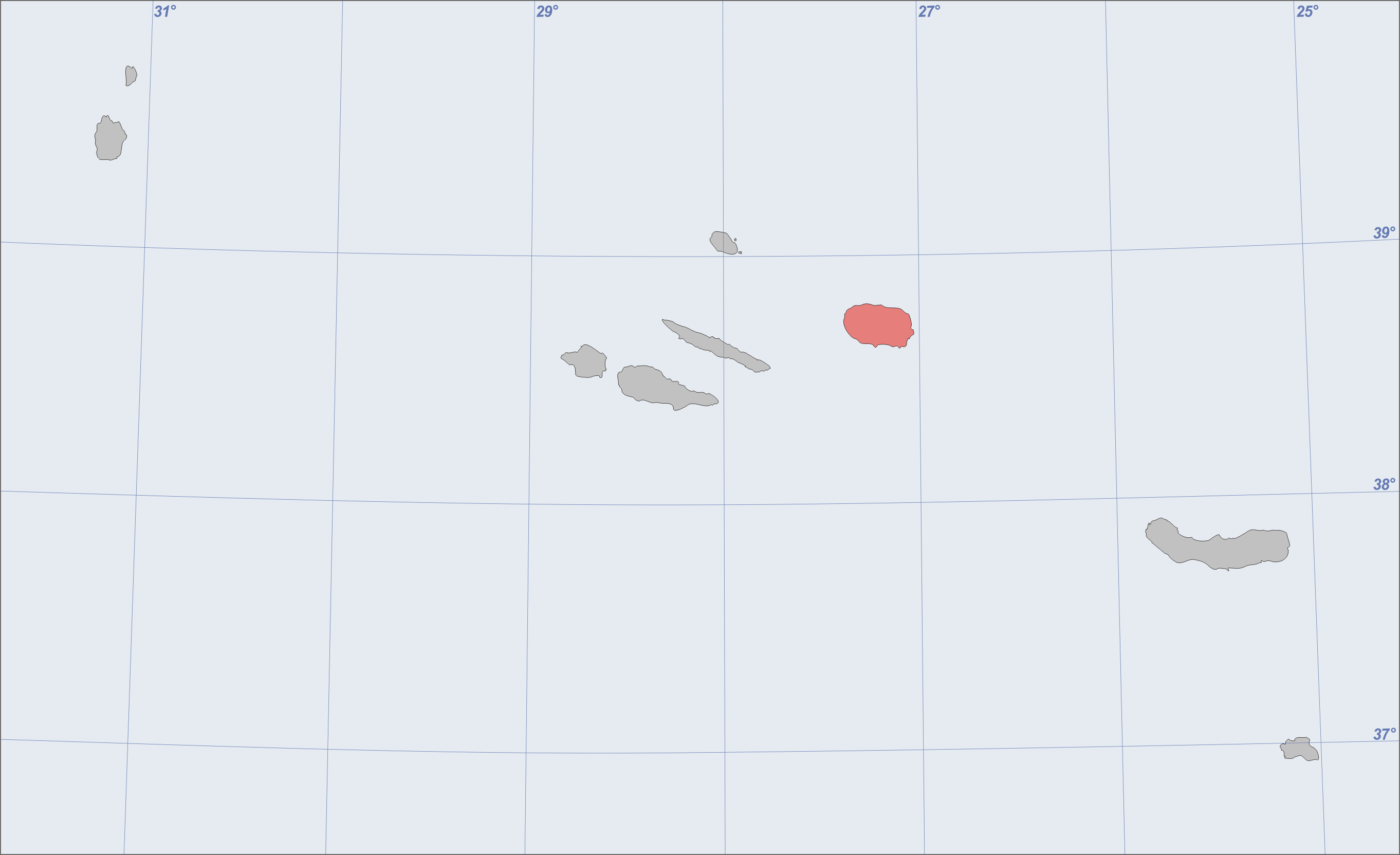
- Location of the island of Terceira in the archipelago of the Azores

Geography
- Location: Atlantic Ocean
- Coordinates: 38°43′40″N 27°12′48″W
- Archipelago: Azores
- Area: 400.28 km^{2} (154.55 sq mi)
- Coastline: 127.56 km (79.262 mi)
- Highest elevation: 1,021.2 m (3350.4 ft)
- Highest point: Serra de Santa Bárbara

Administration
- Portugal
- Autonomous Region: Azores
- Capital and largest city: Angra do Heroísmo (pop. 13,000)

Demographics
- Demonym: Terceirense
- Population: ▼53,244 (2021)
- Languages: Portuguese
- Ethnic groups: Portuguese

Additional information
- Time zone: UTC−01:00

Terceira (Portuguese pronunciation: [tɨɾˈsɐjɾɐ]) is a volcanic island in the Azores archipelago of Portugal, 1,181 km (734 mi) due west of Lisbon. It is one of the larger islands of the archipelago, with a population of 53,311 inhabitants in an area of approximately 396.75 km^{2} (153.19 sq mi).

Terceira is the location of the Azores' oldest city, Angra do Heroísmo, the historical capital of the archipelago and a UNESCO World Heritage Site; the seat of the judicial system (Supreme Court); and the main insular Portuguese Air Force base, Base Aérea nº 4 at Lajes, with a United States Air Force detachment.

Terceira Island has two main sea ports, one at Angra do Heroísmo and the other at Praia da Vitória, and a commercial airport integrated with the flight operations at Lajes.

Portuguese bullfighting is popular on the island, in two versions: the traditional equestrian bullfight (in the ring) and the popular "tourada à corda" that occurs in the streets.

== History ==
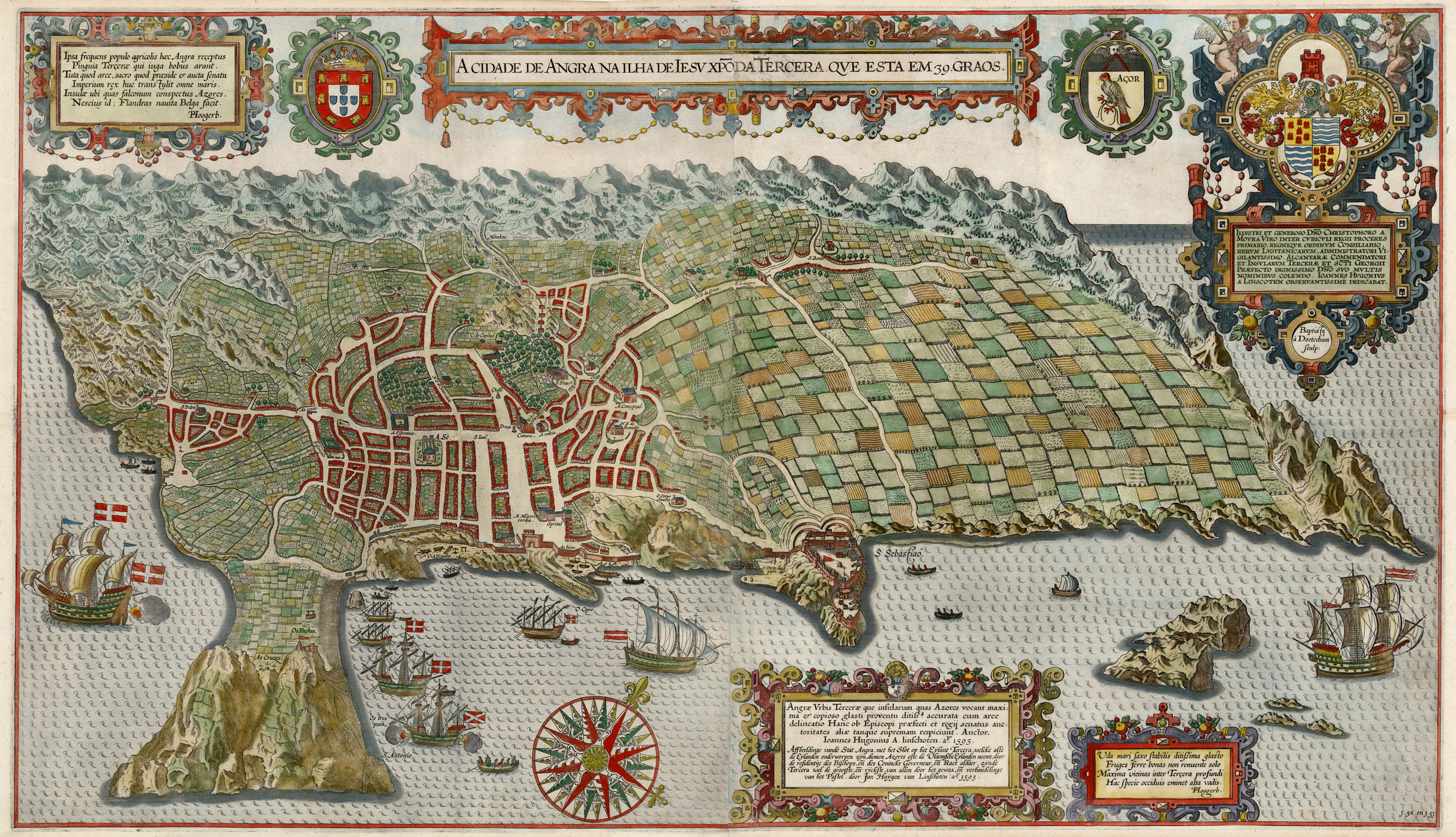
Terceira in 1595 by Jan Huyghen van Linschoten, "A cidade de Angra na ilha de Iesu xpō da Tercera que esta em 39. graos"

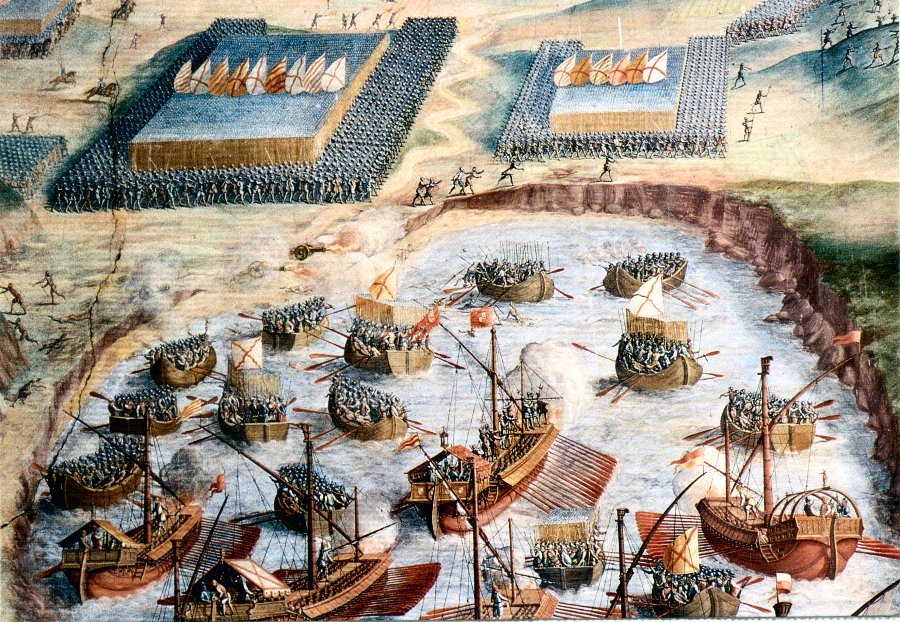
Troops disembarking during the Battle of Terceira; mural in the Monastery of São Lorenzo de El Escorial

There is some uncertainty in the date and the discoverer of the Azores. Nautical charts before the "official" discovery identified islands in the Atlantic Ocean as early as 1325, when a chart by Angelino Dalorto identified "Bracile" west of Ireland, and later one by Angelino Dulcert which identifies the Canaries, and Madeira, along with mysterious islands denominated as "Capraria" (which some historians suggest were São Miguel and Santa Maria). Legends also persisted of Atlantis, Sete Cidades (Kingdoms of the Seven Cities), the Terras of São Brandão (the Land of Saint Brendan), the Ilhas Afortunadas (the Fortunate Islands), the Ilha da Brasil (the Island of Brasil), Antília, the Ilhas Azuis (Blue Islands), and the Terra dos Bacalhaus (Land of Codfish), and charts appeared between 1351 and 1439 of several groupings of islands with various names. The first association between the modern island of Terceira and these stories, was that of the island of Brasil; it first appears as Insula de Brasil in the Venetian map of Andrea Bianco (1436), attached to one of the larger islands of a group of islands in the Atlantic.

In 1439, the first official discovery document appeared, attributing the discovery of the Formigas to Gonçalo Velho Cabral. There is an indication that Terceira may have been discovered by Vicente de Lagos, Velho Cabral's pilot, on 1 January 1445: the first documents after this period started appearing with a third island in the Azorean archipelago, referred to as the Ilha de Jesus Cristo (Island of Jesus Christ), and later, Ilha de Jesus Cristo da Terceira. Gaspar Frutuoso, a chronicler and humanist, would later rationalize about the island's first name, noting that:

- it was discovered on the first day of January, traditionally the feast day of the name of Jesus;
- it was discovered by a captain in the Order of Christ;
- it was discovered on a Thursday or Friday, on Corpo de Deus (Body of Christ); or
- because it was part of the dioceses of Angra, through the invocation of San Salvador (although this implies that a dioceses existed prior to its discovery).

Regardless, it was only a temporary name, as the colloquial Terceira (meaning "third" in Portuguese, as in "the third island" or "third to be discovered") was used more often to describe the island.

The colonization of the island began by decree of Henry the Navigator, dated 21 March 1450, and placed the island in the administrative hands of the Fleming Jácome de Bruges. Its first settler was Fernão d'Ulmo, a Fleming or Frenchman, who later abandoned his plot for unknown reasons. Bruges, although a Flemish nobleman, continued to bring families and settlers from Flanders, and northern Portuguese adventurers (João Coelho, from Guimarães; João da Ponte, from Aveiro; João Bernardes, from Lagos; João Leonarde, from Vieira; and Gonçalo Anes da Fonseca, from Porto), as well as animals and provisions, disembarking in the area of Porto Judeu or Pesqueiro dos Meninos, near Vila de São Sebastião (depending on sources). Frutuoso also affirmed that:

...that ancient settlers of the island of Terceira, that were the first to settle in a band to the north, where they call Quatro Ribeiras, where now the parish of Santa Beatriz is located, and where the first church existed on the island, but were few settlers remained due to difficult access and bad port.

The first settlement occurred in Quatro Ribeiras, in the locality of Portalegre, where a small chapel was raised for the invocation of Santa Ana. Bruges made return trips to Flanders for new settlers to his colony. On one of his trips to Madeira, he conscripted Diogo de Teive and assigned him as his lieutenant and overseer for the island of Terceira. A few years later, Bruges moved his residence to Praia, began construction on the Matriz Church in 1456, and administered the Captaincy of the island from this location (around 1460), until he mysteriously disappeared in 1474, on another of his trips between the colony and the continent. Following his disappearance, the Infanta D. Beatriz, in the name of her son the Infante D. Diogo (who inherited the islands of Terceira and Graciosa following the death D. Fernando, the adopted son of the Infante D. Henrique) divided the island of Terceira into two captaincies: Angra (which was given to João Vaz Corte Real) and Praia (which was given to Álvaro Martins Homem). Apart from the Portuguese and Flemish settlers, colonists from Madeira, many slaves from Africa, new Christians and Jews populated the island at this time, developing new commercial ventures including wheat (exported during the 15th century throughout the empire), sugar-cane, woad (for the dye industry) and woods (principally for the naval construction industries). This development would continue until the end of the 19th century, with the introduction of new products, including tea, tobacco and pineapple.

During the Portuguese succession crisis of 1580, the Azores was the only portion of the Portuguese overseas empire to resist the Spanish until the summer of 1583. Philip II of Spain had offered an amnesty if the Azores surrender, but his messenger met with a very hostile reception at Angra do Heroísmo (escaping to São Miguel, which had presented its allegiance to the King of Spain). Following the Battle of Ponta Delgada, where Don Álvaro de Bazán, 1st Marquis of Santa Cruz defeated the Anglo-French supporters of D. António (the pretender to the Portuguese throne) off the coast of São Miguel, the Marquis concentrated his forces at a less defended beach 10 kilometres (6.2 mi) from Angra do Heroísmo. With a fleet of ninety-six ships and 9,500 men (as well as a garrison of 2,000 on Sao Miguel) the Marquis was able to defeat the forces of D. António after one day's fighting. Although French and English soldiers on the island were allowed to retire unharmed, D. Antonio and a handful of his supporters were lucky to escape with their lives.

One year later, the conquest of the Azores was complete after the island of Terceira was reconciled, followed by the seizure of the island of Faial.

An English expedition fleet under the Earl of Cumberland in 1589, as part of the Azores Voyage of 1589 into Angra Bay, attacked several harbouring Spanish and Portuguese ships and was able to sink or capture five.

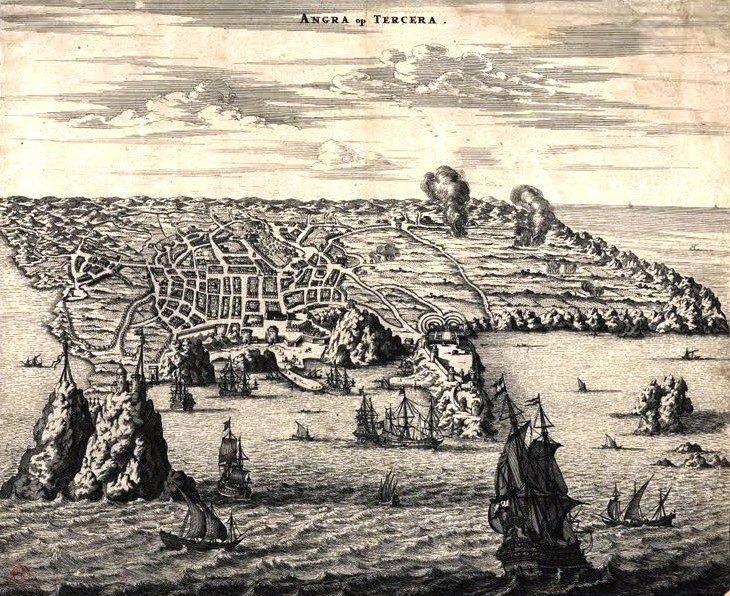
Print of the Angra op Tercera, showing the city of Angra and portions of the island, Jacob van Meurs, 1671

With the acclamation of John IV of Portugal, the Azores applauded the restoration of independence from the Iberian Union. This was not lost on the Spanish settlers in Angra do Heroísmo, who had become a privileged class during the Union, and which made it difficult for them to remain after 1640, when Portuguese sovereignty was restored.

In 1766, the reorganization of system of Captaincies was undertaken, resulting in one Captain-General, with his seat in Angra do Heroísmo for the Azores.

In 1810, a number of journalists and others considered to favor the French, including the industrialist Jácome Ratton, were exiled to the island for a period.

Political tension rose in the 1820s between constitutionalists or Liberals, (supporters of the constitutional monarchy installed by King John VI of Portugal) and those who supported absolute monarchy. Having embraced the cause of constitutionalism, the local Terceirenses established a Junta Provisória in the name of Queen Maria II of Portugal in 1828. Hostilities broke out at the Battle of Praia da Vitória in 1829. In a decree, issued on 15 March 1830, Angra was named as Portuguese capital by the Terceirenses constitutional forces, who protected and supported exiled Liberals who supported the rights of Queen Maria II of Portugal, whose rights were usurped by the Miguelistas (supporters of the absolute monarchy of Miguel I). In 1832, Pedro I (former King and regent of Queen Maria) arrived in the Azores to form a government-in-opposition to the absolutionist regime in Lisbon, presided by the Marques of Palmela, and supported by Azoreans Mouzinho da Silveira and Almeida Garrett that developed many important reforms.

Toward the end of WWII, Portugal went from becoming a neutral country to, in 1944, a non-belligerent country in favor of the allies. A military agreement was signed with the United States which allowed them to establish Lajes Field on the island. The field had already been operational by the British who used the 1373 Treaty of Windsor to get approval to build an Air Force base and they brought in US equipment, but the US was not allowed to realistically use the base until Portugal agreed in 1944.

On 24 August 2001, Terceira made the news as Air Transat Flight 236 managed to land at Lajes Field after running out of fuel in mid-air.

On 16 March 2003, President of the United States George W. Bush, UK Prime Minister Tony Blair, Spanish Prime Minister José María Aznar and Prime Minister of Portugal José Manuel Barroso met on Terceira to discuss the Invasion of Iraq, which began four days later, on 20 March.

On 15 January 2016, then Tropical Storm Alex made an unprecedented landfall on the island with sustained winds reaching 65 miles per hour. This landfall was unprecedented due to the time of year it occurred, which was mid-January. Alex is one of four known tropical cyclones to make landfall on the Island of Terceira, with the others being an unnamed hurricane in 1889, another unnamed hurricane in 1940, and Hurricane Carrie in 1957.

== Geology and Geography ==
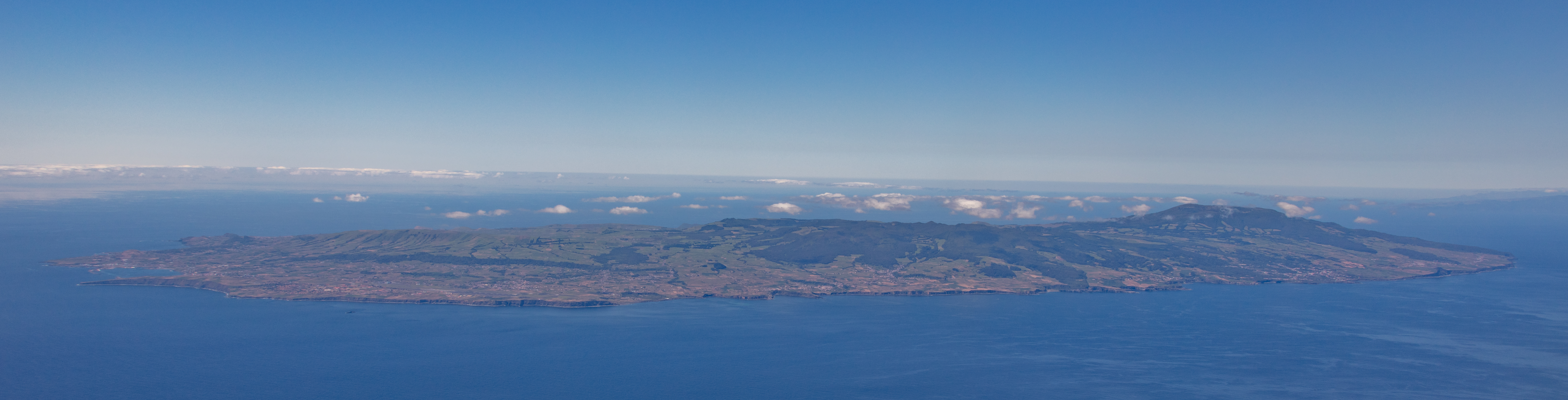
Island of Terceira viewed from the North. Serra de Santa Bárbara, the highest point on the island, is to the West (right on photo)

=== Geology and physical geography ===
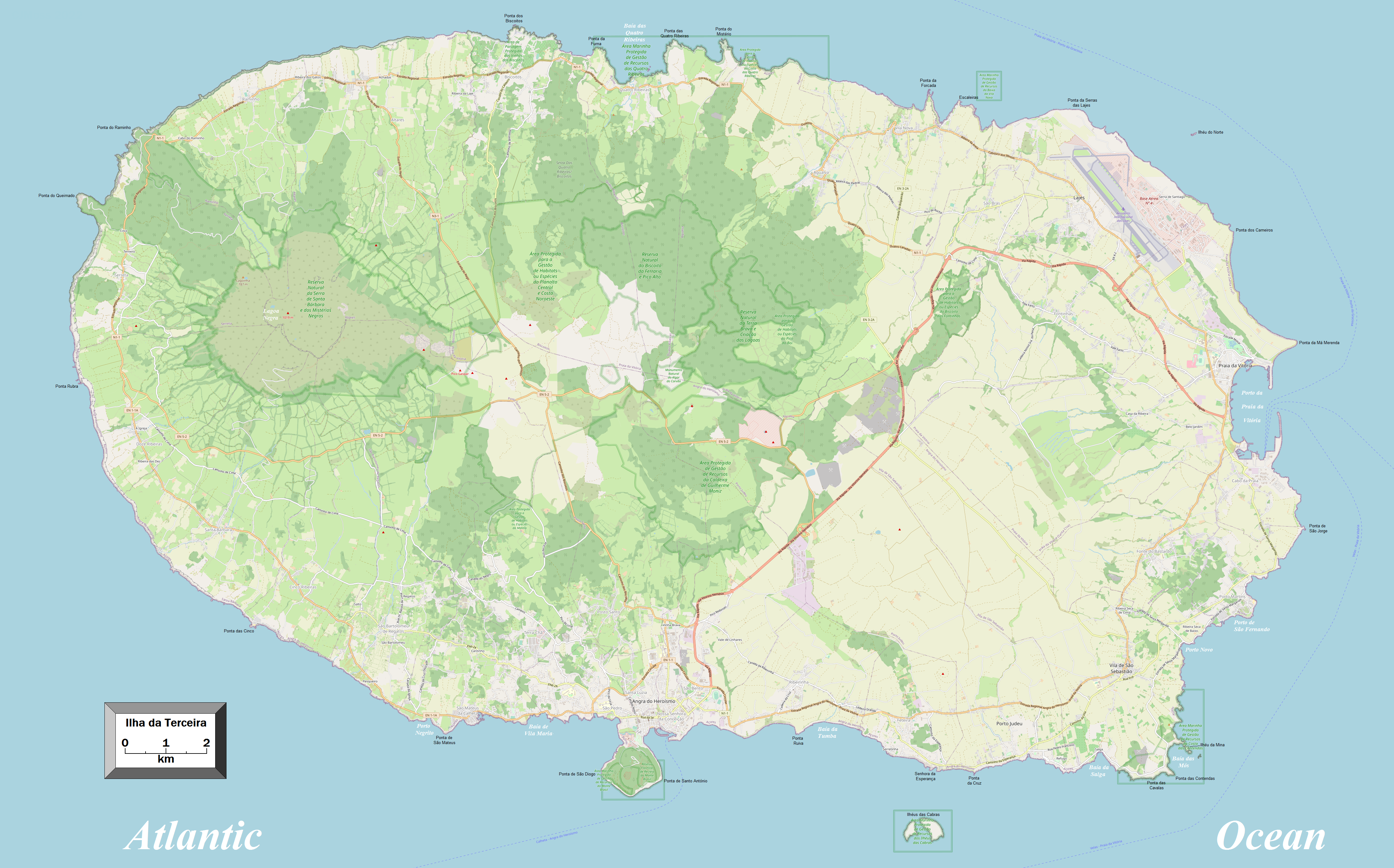
Detailed map of Terceira

Terceira island is an active volcanic island, that is composed of several older extinct volcanoes. The highest point of Terceira is 1021 m, formed by the summit of the dormant Santa Barbara volcano, known as the Serra de Santa Bárbara.

The island of Terceira consists of four overlapping stratovolcanoes built over a geologic structure called the Terceira Rift: a triple junction between the Eurasian, African and North American tectonic plates. These volcanic structures rise from a depth of over 1,500 metres (5,000 ft) from the floor of the Atlantic Ocean. Radiocarbon dating of eruptive units, in support of geologic mapping, has improved the known chronology of Middle to Late Pleistocene and Holocene volcanic activity on the island of Terceira, Azores, defining the east-to-west progression in stratovolcano growth. These have commonly resulted in a classification of the eruptive events into the following structures:

- Cinco Picos Volcanic Complex: the oldest on Terceira (defined by the Serra do Cume), which completed its main sub-aerial activity by about 370–380,000 years ago. Collapse of the upper part of the stratovolcanic edifice formed an enormous 7 by 9 kilometres (4 by 6 miles) caldera about 370,000 years ago. Post-caldera eruptions of basalt from cinder cones on and near the caldera floor and trachytic pyroclastic flow and pumice fall deposits from younger volcanoes west of Cinco Picos have refilled much of the caldera producing an almost-uninterrupted fertile plain.

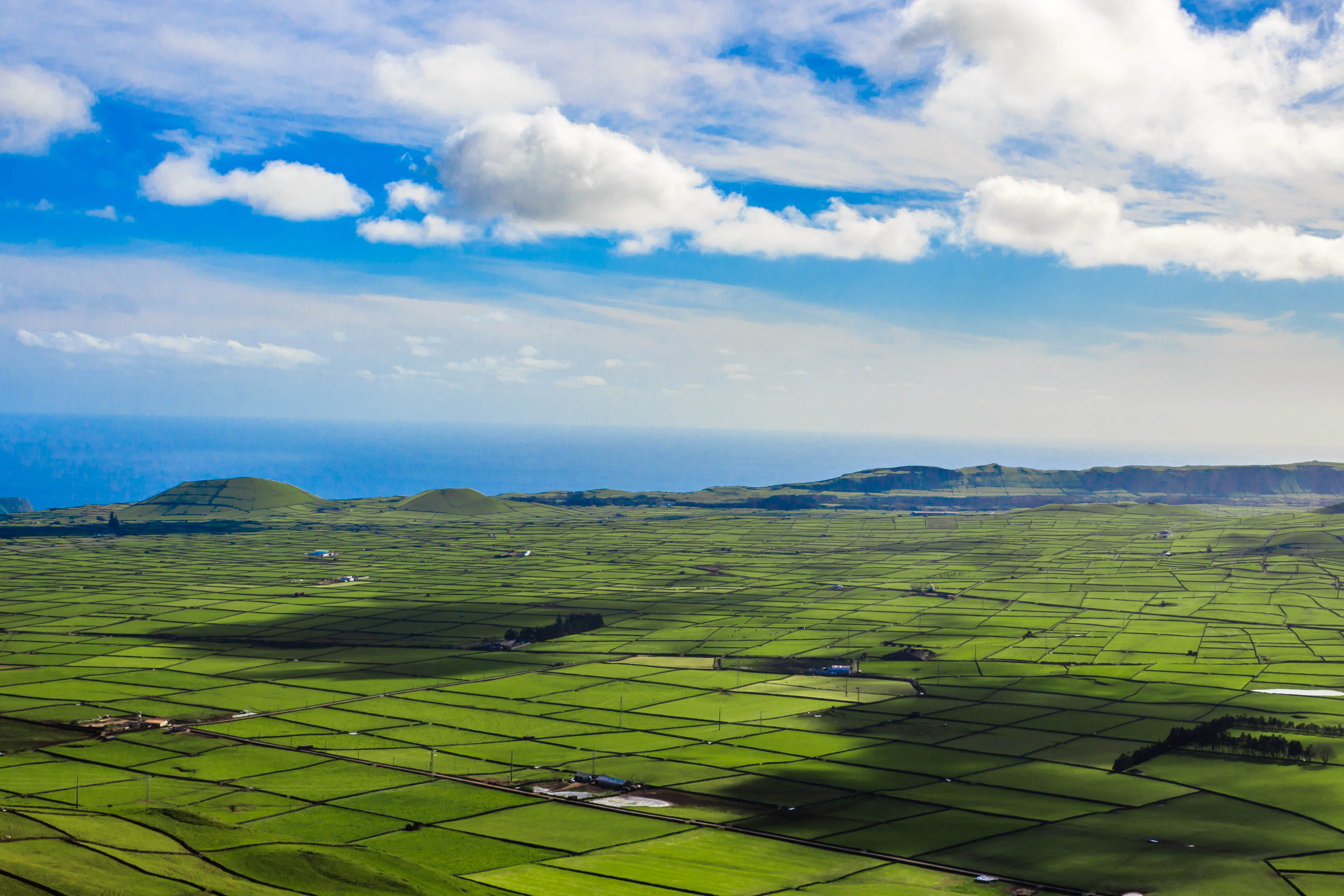
The Achada Plain, within the Guilherme Moniz Volcanic Complex, is a fertile pastureland used for rotational crops and grazing dairy cattle

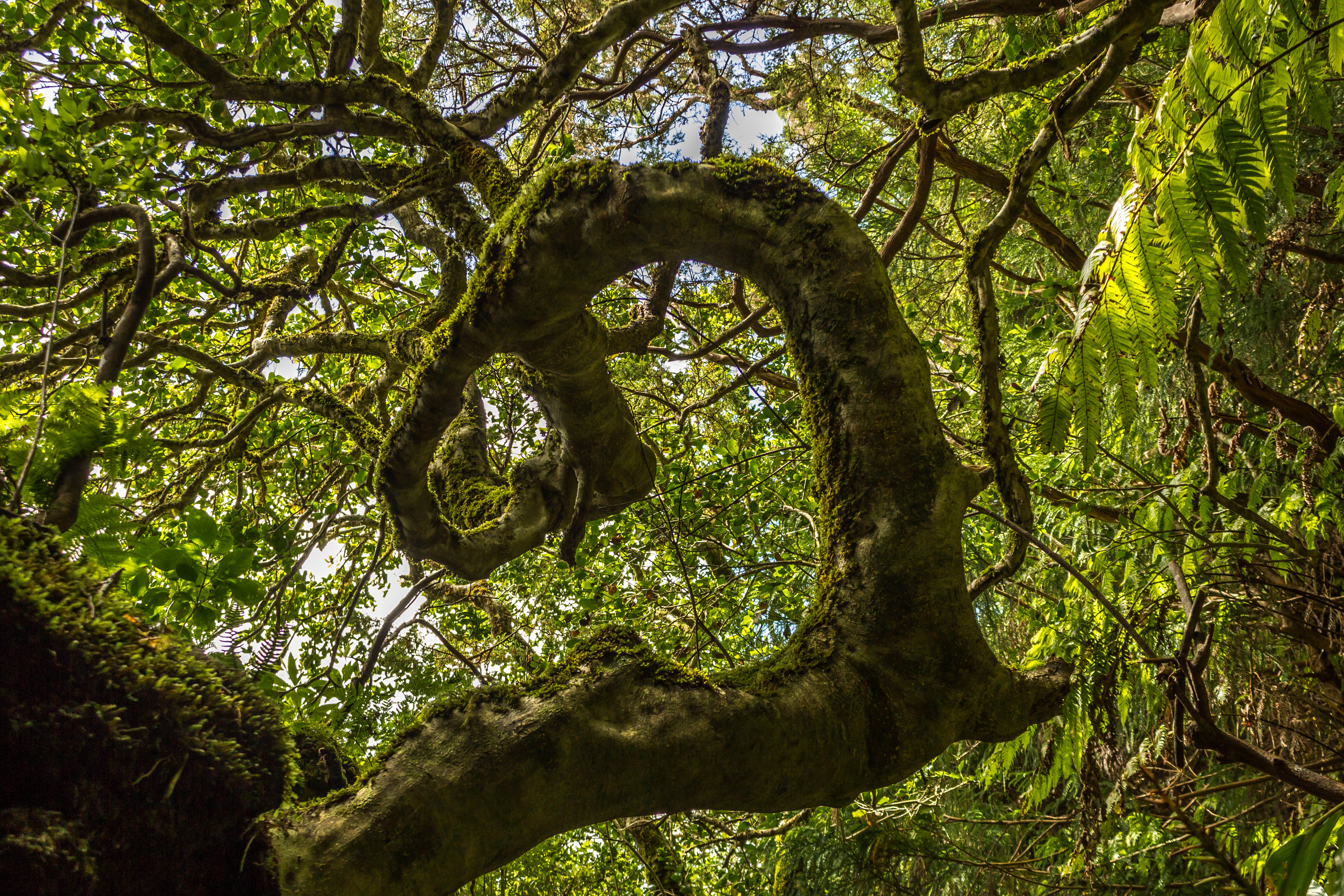
Laurisilva forests of Terceira's Central Plain

- Guilherme Moniz Volcanic Complex: the southern portion, in the central part of the island, began erupting about 100,000 years later (about 270,000 ka) and produced trachyte domes (approximately 808 m/2651 ft in altitude), flows, and minor pyroclastic deposits for another 100,000 years (until at least 111 ka). The highest point along the caldera rim reaches 623 metres (2,044 feet). The northern portion of the Caldera is less well exposed, but reflects a similar age range. The northwest portion of the caldera was formed sometime after 44 ka. Several well-studied ignimbrites that blanket much of the island likely erupted from Guilherme Moniz Volcano.
- Pico Alto Volcanic Complex: a tightly spaced cluster of trachyte domes and short flows, is a younger part of Guilherme Moniz Volcano. Stratigraphic studies and radiocarbon analysis suggest that most of the Pico Alto eruptions occurred during the period from about 9000 to 1000 years BP.
- Santa Barbara Volcanic Complex: the youngest stratovolcano on Terceira, began erupting prior to 29,000 years ago, and has been active historically, comprises the western end of the island and at its highest point is 1,023 metres (3,356 feet). This stratovolcano is surrounded by several domes and coulee trachyte formations that occupy the volcano's caldera and along various alignments of the volcano's flanks.
- Fissural Zone: Connecting the eastern portion of Santa Bárbara, the western frontier of Pico Alto and Guilherme Moniz exist a grouping of fissural volcanoes and basaltic cones (Hawaiian and Strombolian), the youngest of which formed about 15,000 years ago. The only historical eruptions occurred in 1761, along a fissure on the eastern face of Santa Bárbara, and in 1867 and between 1998 and 2000 from submarine vents off the western coast (Serreta). The groupings of volcanic structures on the island are aligned along a northwest–southwest and west-northwest-east-southeast orientation that extends to the submarine vents/volcanoes towards the eastern basin of Graciosa, including geomorphological alignments of smaller volcanic structures (including both basaltic and trachytic cones).

Island tectonics are highlighted by two great faults in the northeast corner (the Lajes and the Fontinhas faults), the Lajes Graben has been responsible for severe seismic events. Historically, both faults have produced earthquakes that are relatively shallow, strong and responsible for the destruction of property in the northeastern corner (specifically in 1614 and 1841). During the 1614 event, whose epicenter was located along the Lajes fault eight kilometres (5.0 miles) offshore, recorded magnitudes for the earthquake were between 5.8 and 6.3 on the Richter scale (Wells and Coppersmith,1994). Both the Lajes and Fontinhas faults are separated by three kilometres (1.9 miles)). A second, less-developed, graben is located on the southeast of the Santa Bárbara stratovolcano. This feature is marked by trachyte domes and crosses from the coast at Ponta do Queimado (from the historical basin of Serreta) to the cliffs, faults, basaltic lava and fissural eruptions near the center of the island.

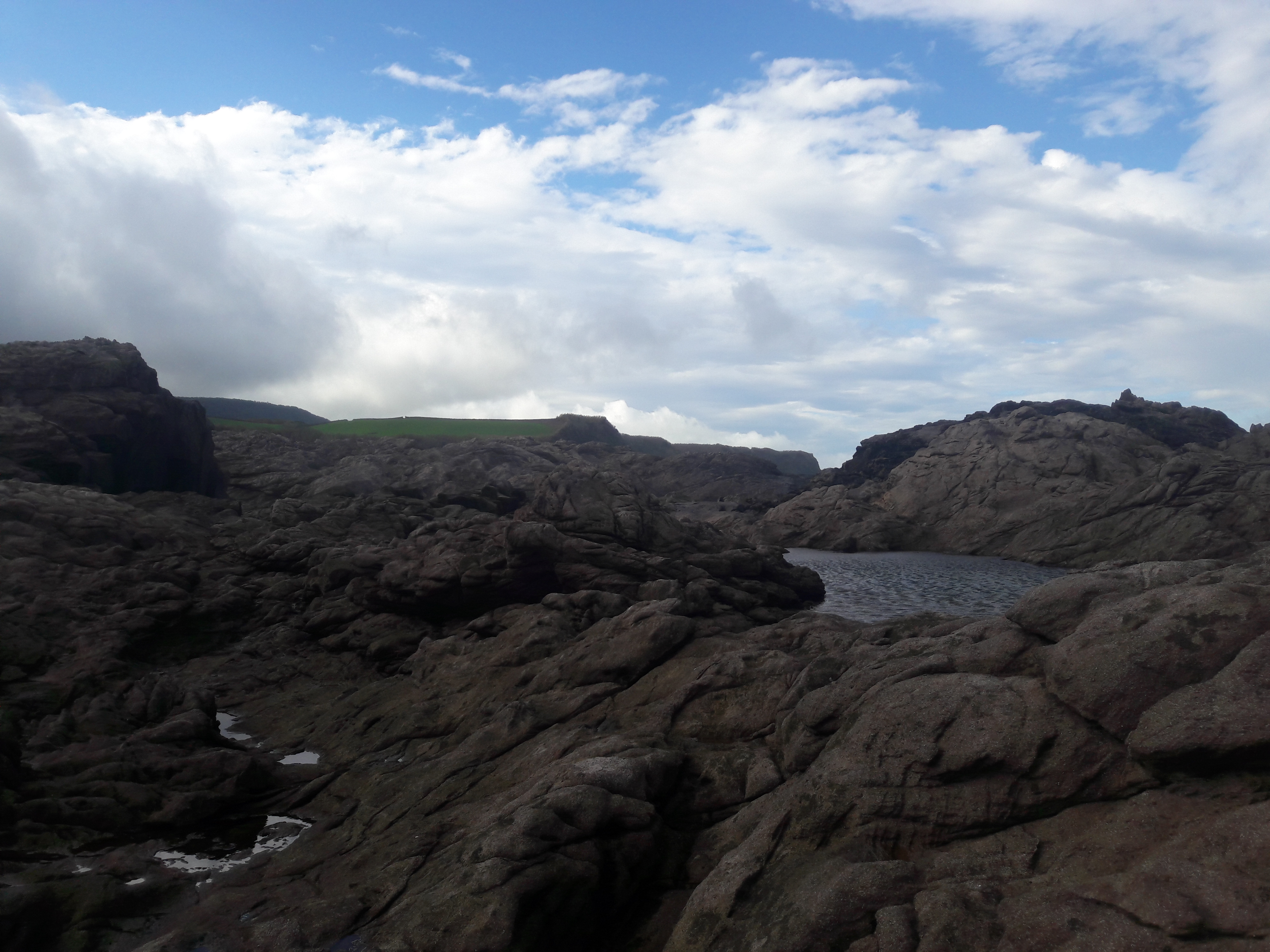
Black volcanic rock near the coast

The western part of Terceira Island is more heavily forested than the eastern part, due to the prevailing westerly winds bringing increased precipitation to that side, resulting in forests of Cryptomeria (Cryptomeria japonica). Other geomorphological points of interest include the plains of Achada, the mounts near Santa Bárbara, the small lakes of Lagoa das Patas and Lagoa da Falca. The northern coast is an area marked by evidence of volcanic activity with several mistérios (lava fields), the swimming pools of Biscoitos, while the centre of the island is highlighted by the Algar do Carvão and Furnas do Enxofre (dormant and active volcanic forms) that are popular with tourists and geologists. Most of the island is ringed by coastal cliffs about 20 m (60 ft) high, except on the south coast near Angra do Heroísmo. Here, an eruption of basaltic lava in shallow water formed the tuff cone of Monte Brasil, which protects and shelters the harbor of the island's capital. The cone is about one kilometre (0.6 miles) in diameter and rises 205 metres (673 feet) above the western side of the harbor.

=== Ecoregions and protected zones ===
Away from the coast, Terceira is a wild and hilly landscape with many walking and hiking trails. Much of the interior of the island is a nature reserve; from the heights of the Serra do Cume to the slopes of Santa Bárbara, there are several paths along the patchwork of small farms, stonewalls and forests.

=== Human geography ===
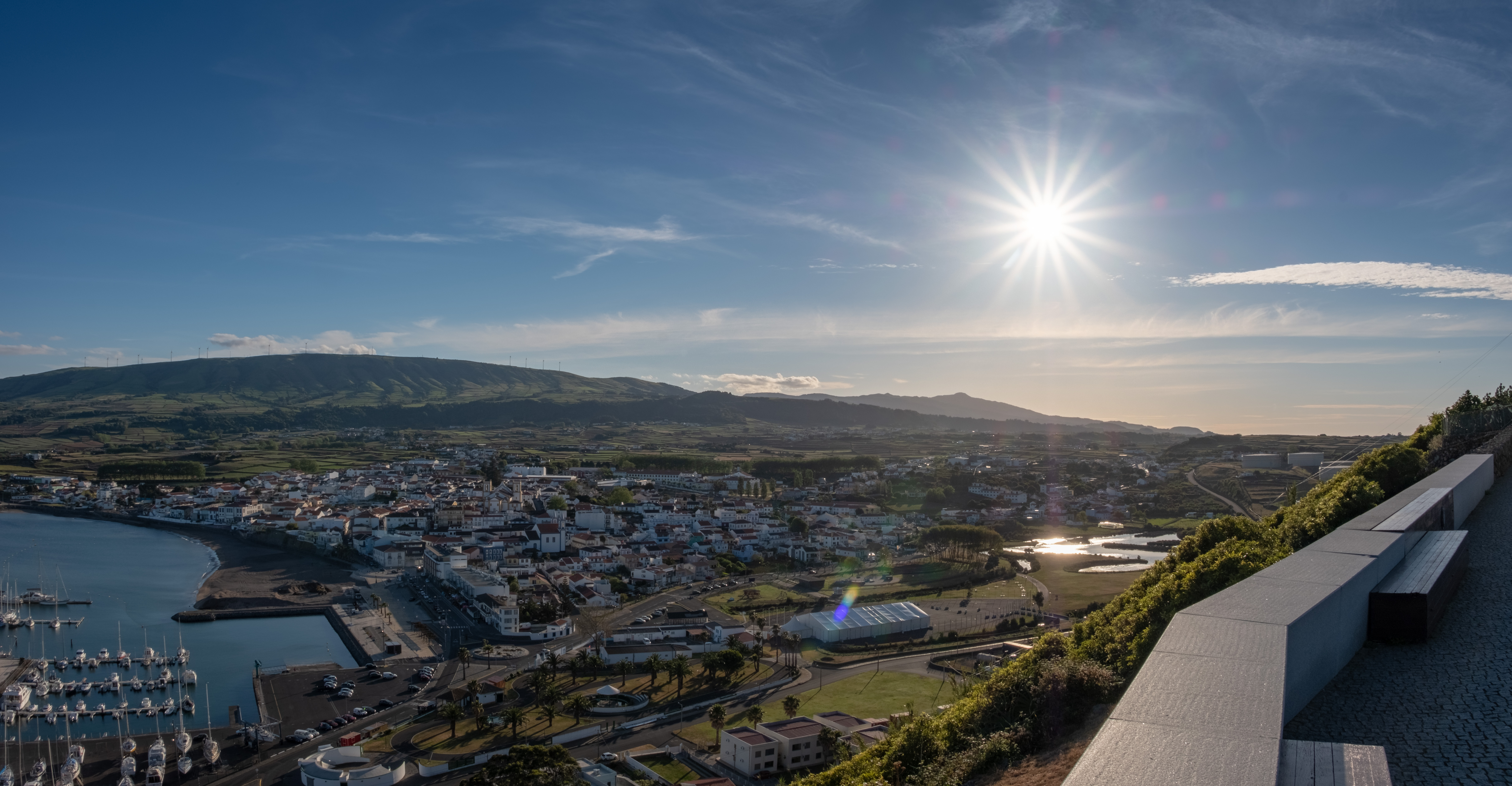
Praia da Vitória, as seen from the south-east corner

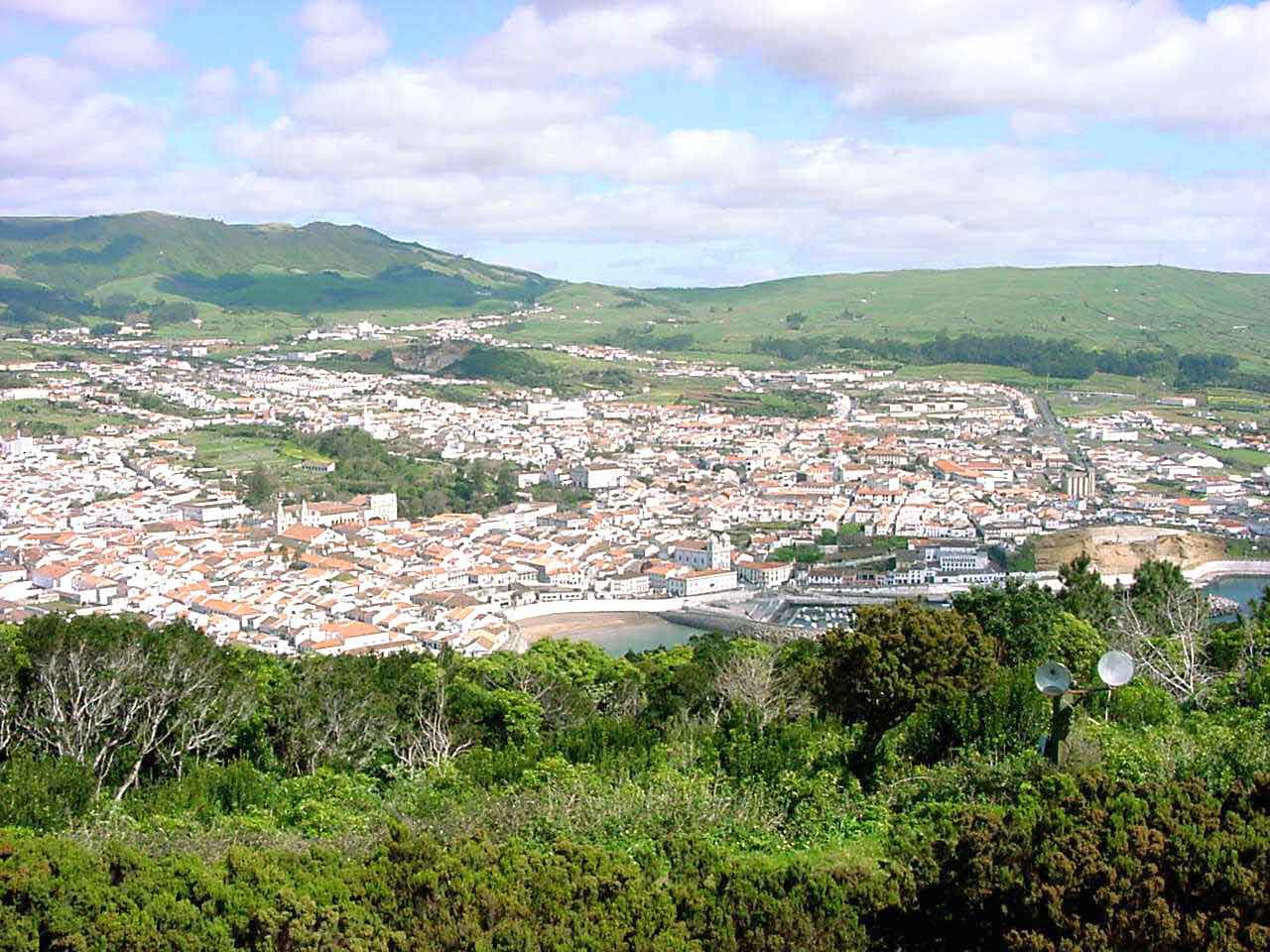
Angra do Heroísmo, as seen from Monte Brasil, on the southern coast of Terceira

Much like other islands of the Azores (Açores), human settlement was dictated by the geomorphology of the terrain. The number of volcanic cones and the stratovolcanos that occupy the major part of the interior of the island, forced most communities along the coastal lowlands and river-valleys, producing a "ring" of urbanization that circles the island, usually following the Regional Road network. These communities began as agricultural enclaves, based on subsistence farming and a patchwork of hedged parcels of land. The nuclei of these communities were the religious parishes, and the churches that dot the landscape of the island.

Administratively, Terceira is divided (along an irregular diagonal frontier from north-northwest to south-southeast) into two municipalities: Angra do Heroísmo and Praia da Vitória. The municipality of Angra do Heroísmo is in the southern half of the island, and includes the historical town of Angra, its suburban communities and many of the coastal resort communities (such as Porto Martins). Praia da Vitória is highly concentrated in the north-northeast corner of the island, along an axis between Cabo do Porto and Lajes. It is generally considered the industrialized center of the island, and is the location of one of the two main commercial ports, the international airport and many of the associated businesses associated with the Air Force base. Apart from the uninhabited areas at the center of the island, the northwestern and portions of the western coast are sparsely populated, apart from small agglomerations of homes along the roadways. Within the municipal framework, communities are subdivided into local civil parishes (19 in Angra do Heroismo and 11 in Praia da Vitória), and managed by the executive (that includes a President and cabinet) and the civil committee (with its chairperson and assembly) of the Junta Freguesia.

- Agualva
- Altares
- Biscoitos
- Cabo da Praia
- Cinco Ribeiras
- Doze Ribeiras
- Feteira
- Fonte do Bastardo
- Fontinhas
- Lajes
- Nossa Senhora da Conceição
- Porto Judeu
- Porto Martins
- Posto Santo
- Quatro Ribeiras
- Raminho
- Ribeirinha
- Santa Bárbara
- Santa Cruz
- Santa Luzia
- São Bartolomeu de Regatos
- São Bento
- São Brás
- São Mateus da Calheta
- São Pedro
- Sé
- Serreta
- Terra Chã
- Vila de São Sebastião
- Vila Nova

Angra do Heroísmo, the historical capital of the Azores (Açores), is the oldest city in the archipelago, dating back to 1534. Owing to the importance of the historical center in the "maritime explorations of the 15th and 16th centuries", UNESCO declared the historical center as a World Heritage Site. This was, in part, due to the fact that, as a link between the New World and Europe, Vasco de Gama, in 1499, and Pedro de Alvarado, in 1536, set up Angra as an obligatory port-of-call for the fleets of equatorial Africa and of the East and West Indies. The classification by UNESCO was based on criteria 4 and 5 that governed the inclusion based on universal historical significance (based on its place in the exploration).

== Economy ==
The main economic activity on the island is raising of livestock and the production of dairy-based products. The island has two main sea ports, one at Angra do Heroísmo and the other at Praia da Vitória, and a commercial airport integrated with the flight operations at Base Aérea nº 4 (in the community of Lajes).

== Culture ==
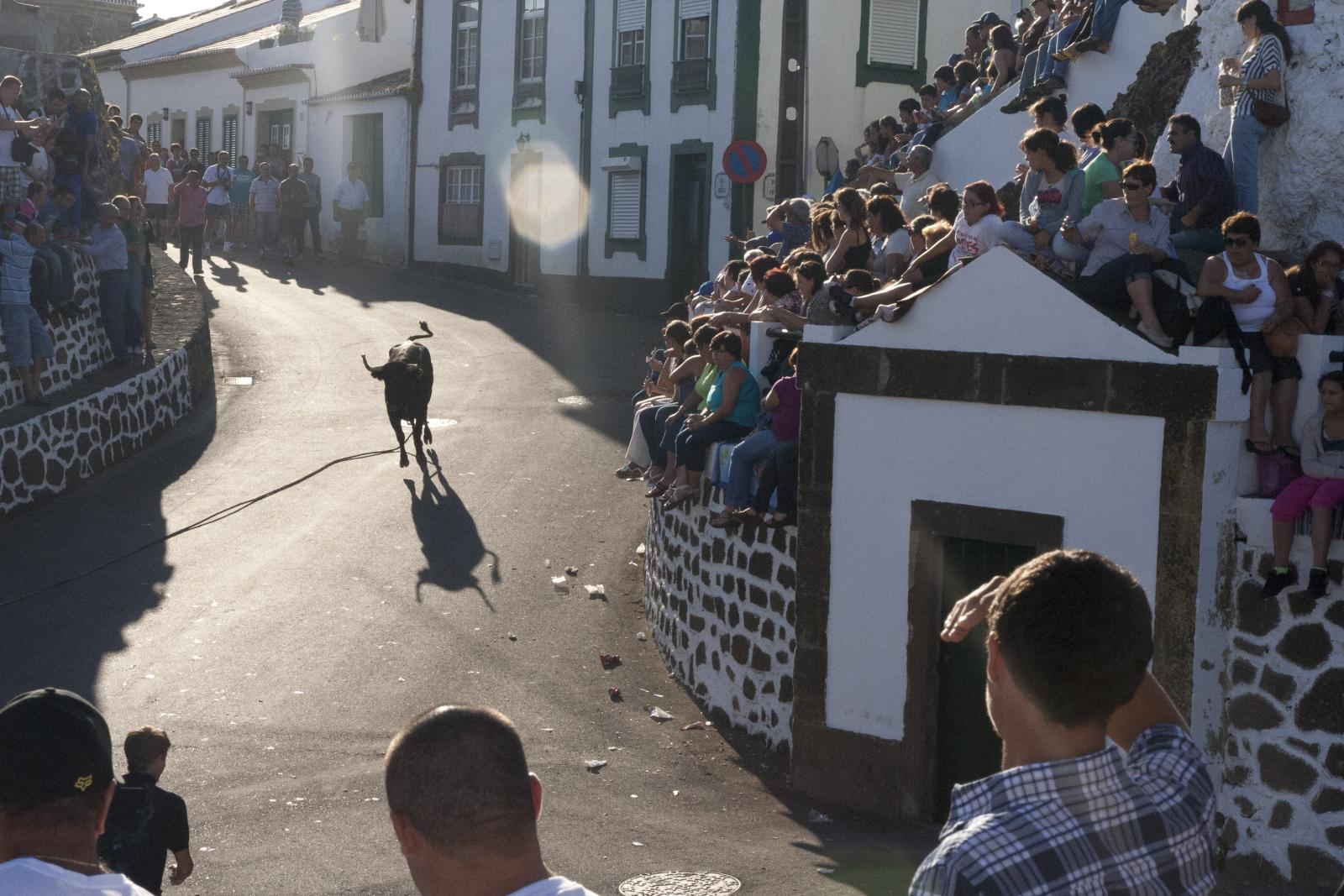
Touradas à corda

The Portuguese bullfight is popular on the island, coming in two variations: the traditional equestrian bullfight (in the ring) and the popular "touradas à corda" that occur in the streets.

Popular since the 16th century, the "touradas à corda" (literally bullfights-by-rope) are held by local Terceiran villagers from April/May to late September. In these events, similar to the Running of the Bulls, a bull is let loose from the town's square (or other open space) with a very long rope around its neck. The other end of the rope are held by eight "pastores", men dressed in traditional garb (white shirts, grey pants and a black hat), who control the animal from a distance (providing some sense of security). Courageous people then attempt to provoke the animal and get as close to it while avoiding being gored (resulting in the occasional injury or mayhem). Some "touradas à corda" also do away with the rope entirely or become semi-aquatic (when the bulls chase the participants off a dock). Following these "games" the animal is eventually retrieved and a festival will begin.

In some towns, a Portuguese equestrian bullfight will take place involving a grand procession and participation of men dressed in 16th-century costume: the pantalones (the horsemen), the bandarilheiros (the horsemen's squires), the matadores and the widely popular forcados (eight men who challenge the bull). A horsemen, usually riding a Lusitanian breed of horse, is the centre of this event: the rider will attempt to wear out the bull, while lancing a dart onto the bull's back. The matadores, in comparison to their Spanish counterparts, play a small role, usually distracting the bull during the event. At the end of each bout/bullfight, the lead forcado will challenge the bull to charge, while the remainder of the team follow the leader. The team leader attempts to grab the animal by its horns then, supported by his team, they subdue the bull. Once exhausted, the animal, normally disoriented, barely reacts when the group disperses.

One festivity that is celebrated at large on Terceira is Carnaval. Carnaval, or "Entrudo"as it is called on the island, is celebrated in quite a different way than other cultures around the world. The celebration starts on the Saturday before Ash Wednesday, when halls around the island open their doors to the public who waits to see the performances.

These performances are in the form of dance groups that travel around the island to get on stage and show the work that they put in for the people to enjoy. These dances are a way of showing bravado and magnificence in the form of popular theater. It is essentially a way of entering Lent, the idea behind "entrudo".

There are different kinds of dances, and they come from the ideas of those who create these different groups. Basically, every dance brings their unique outfits, music, songs as well as a play. The celebration of Carnaval in Terceira ends on the Tuesday before Lent. The tradition is so important within this society that those who have emigrated brought the custom along with them. This can be seen in areas such as Northeastern United States, California and Canada.

Carnaval in Terceira is celebrated between the Saturday and Tuesday stated above, but in reality the planning that is required for this all to occur can take all year. The clothing that groups wear have intricate designs and the songs and plays created just for this day demand much time. There is also a time before Carnaval in which the elderly of the island have their performances in a tradition called "Danças da Terceira Idade". These are essentially dances created specifically for the elderly to partake in a tradition that they had a hand in upholding.

=== LGBTI+ Community ===
Though the Azores are generally socially conservative, of all the islands, Terceira is known for having the most open gay male community. The famous twentieth century Terceiran poet, J.H. Santos Barros argued in 1978 that a tradition of homosexuality on the island dated back to the influence of Castilian troops stationed on the island in the 16th century.

The organisation Opus Diversidade (originally Opus Gay) - one of the oldest LGBTQ+ organisations in Portugal - was founded in Terceira in 1997. The first same sex marriage in the Azores took place in Angra de Heroismo in 2010. In 2013, the documentary film, O Carnaval é um Palco, a Ilha uma Festa (The carnival is a stage, the island a party) won the best documentary prize at the QueerLisboa Festival. The film reported on the tradition of drag queens ("matrafonas") at the carnival festivities on Terceira.

== See also ==
- Battle of Terceira (1583)
- Biscoitos IPR
- Hurricane Alex
- List of volcanoes in Azores
