= Santa Bárbara (Angra do Heroísmo) =

- Civil parish
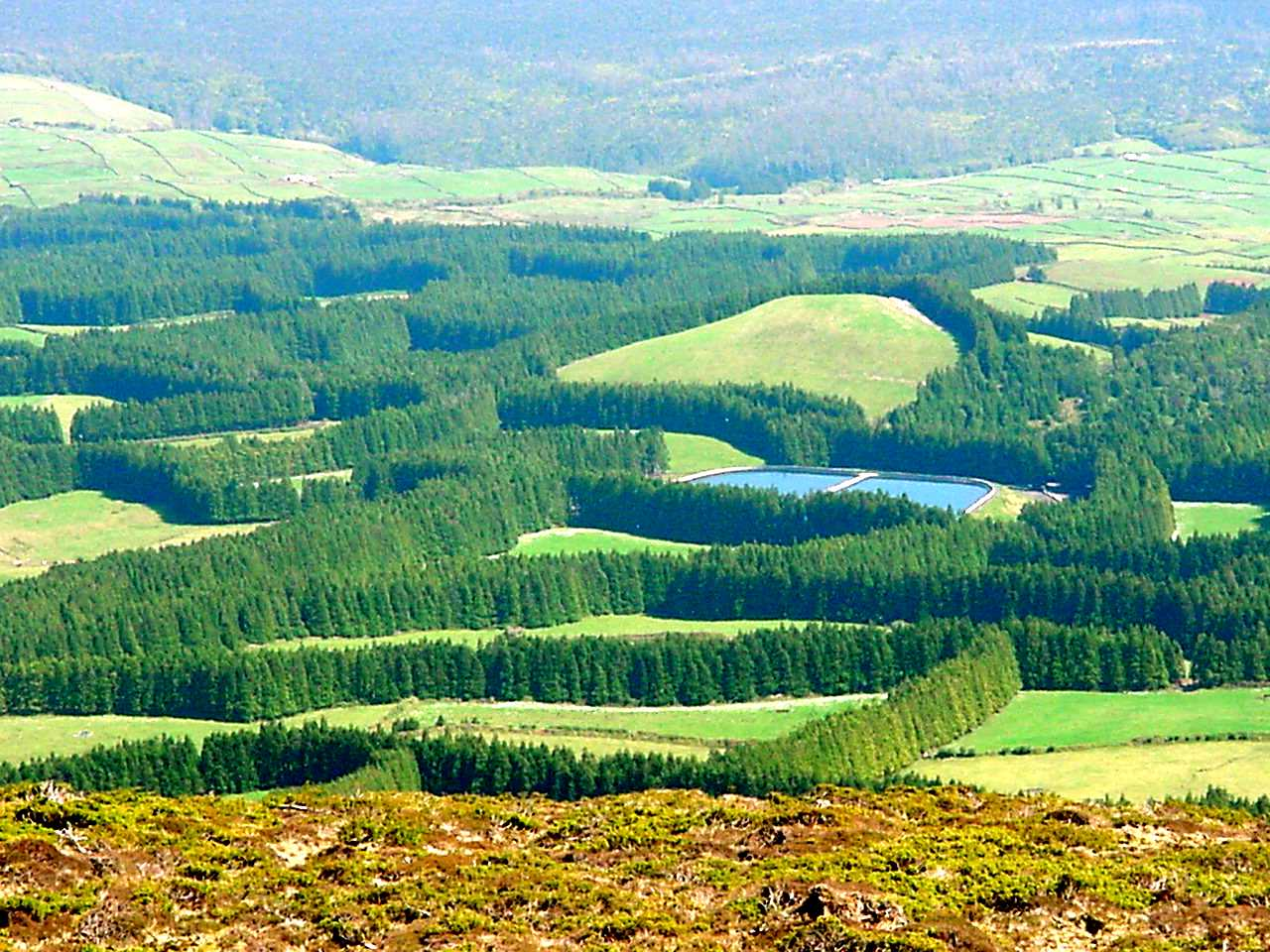
- The forested vista as seen from the Serra da Santa Bárbara

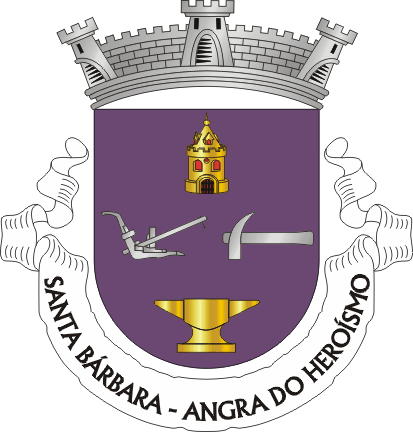
- Coat of arms

- Location in the Azores Santa Bárbara (Terceira)
- Coordinates: 38°41′49″N 27°20′33″W
- Country: Portugal
- Auton. region: Azores
- Island: Terceira
- Municipality: Angra do Heroísmo
- Established: Settlement: fl. 1489

Area
  - Total: 16.40 km^{2} (6.33 sq mi)
- Elevation: 172 m (564 ft)

Population (2011)
  - Total: 1,274
  - Density: 77.68/km^{2} (201.2/sq mi)
- Time zone: UTC−01:00 (AZOT)
  - Summer (DST): UTC+00:00 (AZOST)
- Postal code: 9700-471
- Area code: 292
- Patron: Santa Bárbara

Santa Bárbara (pronounced [ˈsɐ̃.tɐ ˈbaɾ.bɐ.ɾɐ]) is a parish in the municipality of Angra do Heroísmo on the island of Terceira in the Azores. The population in 2011 was 1,274, in an area of 16.40 km^{2} (6.33 sq mi). It contains the localities As Nove, Canada da Nossa Senhora da Ajuda, Pico das Seis, Pico dos Enos and Santa Bárbara.
