= Três Paus redoubt =

Abandoned fort in Terceira, Azores

- Reduto dos Três Paus
- Terceira, Central, name=Azores in Portugal

Site information
- Type: Fort
- Operator: Portuguese Army
- Open to the public: Private

Location
- Location of the fortification within the municipality of Angra do Heroísmo, island of Terceira
- Coordinates: 38°38′48″N 27°13′07″W

Site history
- Built: 1543
- Materials: Basalt, Tuff

The Três Paus redoubt (Portuguese: Reduto dos Três Paus) is a redoubt fortification situated on the peninsula of Monte Brasil, in the civil parish of Sé, in the municipality of Angra do Heroísmo, in the Portuguese archipelago of the Azores. Part of the fortified defenses of the Fortress of São João Baptista, it was also known as the Fort/Redoubt of Benedict the Moor (Portuguese: Forte/Reduto de São Benedito do Monte Brasil).

== History ==
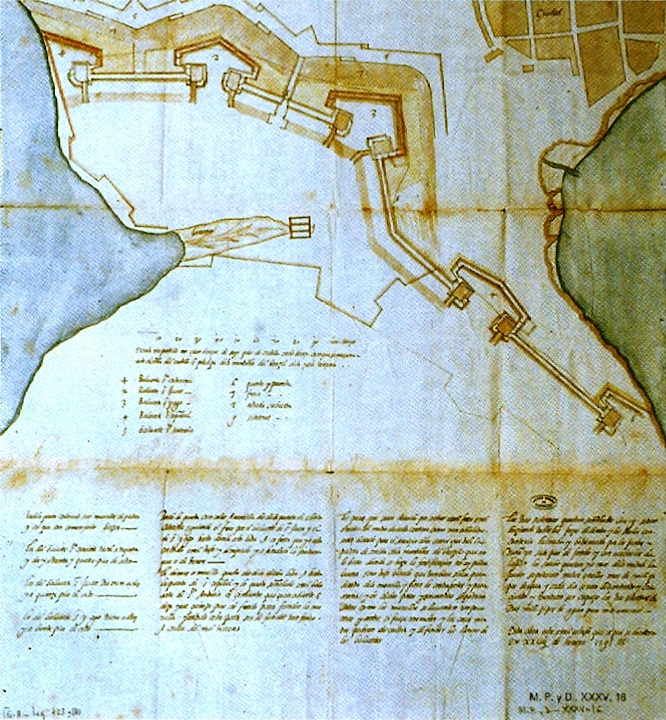
A 1595 map of the fortress of Monte Brasil

Bartolomeu Ferraz first presented his recommendations to John III of Portugal in 1543 for the fortification of the Azores, then an important waypoint in trans-Atlantic commerce between the Indies and America. On 5 March 1567, in his proposal to the Crown, Engineer Tommaso Benedetto elaborated a plan to protect the island's coastal defence, that included the construction of a fort on Monte Brasil. Shortly following this proposal, the Portuguese Crown began the construction of the Fort of Dois Paus, in order to protect the port of Dois Paus-Portinho Novo.

During the dynastic crisis (in 1580), the Azores supported the Portuguese cause of António, Prior of Crato and his claim to the throne, resulting in an insular rebellion that lasted for three years. The anti-Philippine resistance was determined to reinforce the coastal fortifications. On 13 October 1581, a letter from Frair Simão de Barros was sent to Queen Elizabeth for military assistance. In order to prepare the resistance on the island, fortifications were constructed on the eastern coast of Monte Brasil: the Fort of Santo António and Fort of São Benedito, that included a long wall and trench, and to the west the establishment of the Fort of Zimbreiro.

In the context of the installation of the Captaincy-General of the Azores, the status of the fortifications were reported as:

...In the stated redoubt of Benedict the Moor, it has eight canon emplacements and four pieces of iron, three esfuguenadas, and requires another four with its equipment.

The redoubt was part of an array of coastal defences on the eastern coast of Monte Brasil, oriented toward the Bay of Angra, that included the Redoubt of Dois Paus, Redoubt of São Francisco, the Redoubt of Santo Inácio and the Fort of Santo António. It currently includes several abandoned and derelict buildings, and is found in a state of ruin.
