= CSS Run'her =

History

Confederate States
- Builder: John & William Dugeon
- Completed: 1863
- Fate: Wrecked on 5 November 1864

General characteristics
- Type: Steamship
- Length: 70 m

The Run'her was a Confederate cargo and minelaying steamship that was shipwrecked in the Bay of Angra, on the island of Terceira in the Portuguese archipelago of the Azores in 1863. It is part of the subaquatic archaeological park of the municipality of Angra do Heroísmo.

== History ==
The Run'her was constructed in the United Kingdom in 1863, in the shipyard of J & W Dudgeon, on the Isle of Dogs, London for the Confederate States. It was 230 feet (70 m) in length, 27 feet (8.2 m) wide, with a depth of 14 feet (4.3 m) and 10 feet (3.0 m) draft. In the context of the American Civil War (1861-1865), the Run'her was part of a fleet of blockade-runners, that carried equipment and laid naval mines.

The ship was one in a series of ships built for William G. Crenshaw Co., a joint British-Confederate business, constructed to meet a Confederate contract to carry military, medical and other equipment, in addition to goods for the Confederacy. This because the Confederacy had a chronic lack of foreign credit, and the Confederate government was obliged to contract to acquire the ships with six advanced British naval shipyards in return for the shipment of cotton. It was only after payment amortization that the debt for the construction would be paid, and the ships become the property of the southern States.

=== Shipwreck ===
The ship departed from London with a crew of 50 and arrived on the island of Terceira in four days (around noon on the 5 November 1864), with the intention of ending its voyage at its destination in Bermuda. Instead of taking on a pilot (as was the custom), Captain Edwin Courtenay proceeded at full-speed into the harbour at Angra do Heroísmo and ran the ship aground in the bay's sandy bottom, along the shoreline near the customs wharf. This followed a period of excessive care taken by the captain when rounding the pier. The captain's attempts to free the ship were in vain.

=== Aftermath ===
On 18 November 1864, 12 days after the shipwreck Courtney and majority of the crew (35 men) returned to Lisbon, by way of São Miguel, aboard the Portuguese steamship Maria Pia.

It is likely that the ship was declared a loss, and it was eventually sold at auction on 8 December 1864 for 800$00 reis. A secondary auction was held for the engine and a box of platinum, and on 19 December a final auction for the remaining goods. A southeastern storm battered the remains of the ship that night, and much of the ship's remains were dispersed offshore after being battered against the rocky shore. It is assumed that the arrival of the Confederate blockade runners Whisper and Rattlesnake several days after the storm were in order to recover the military cargo, but they found little salvageable material. What was salvaged included several boxes of salted meat from the Run'her's cargo, which were sold on 9 April 1865 to an English ship returning from Mexico.

== Excavation ==
The ships remains were re-discovered in sand, during an archaeological impact assessment in the northwest part of the Bay of Angra in 1996 for the eventual construction of a new marina. In the course of the examination, divers identified two boilers on the remains of the ship, in the area known as Angra D. Iron plates and odd-dimensioned artefacts were also discovered around the shipwreck, which were being transported to the Confederate states for production of munitions.

There was evidence that the flattened wreck and its components were strewn over a debris field covered up by 1.5 metres (4.9 ft) sand and fine silt to an average depth of 6 metres (20 ft).

== See also ==
- Baía de Angra do Heroísmo
- Parque Arqueológico Subaquático da Baía de Angra do Heroísmo
