= Francisco Ornelas da Câmara =

12th Captain-Donatário of Praia
- In office 1663–1665
- Monarchs: Philip II of Portugal; Philip III of Portugal
- Preceded by: Luís de Portugal, 6th Count of Vimioso
- Succeeded by: Brás de Ornelas
- Constituency: Terceira

Personal details
- Born: Francisco Ornelas da Câmara; 12 October 1606 Praia
- Died: 28 April 1664 (aged 57) Praia
- Resting place: Church of Santa Cruz, Praia
- Citizenship: Kingdom of Portugal

Francisco Ornelas da Câmara (Praia, 12 October 1606 — Praia, 28 April 1664), nobleman and Azorean politician who was instrumental in the period of the Portuguese Restoration War, being responsible for its declaration in the Azores, and his military campaign against the Spanish-occupied Fortress of São João Baptista (1641-1642).

== Biography ==
=== Early life ===
He was the son of Francisco Paim Câmara and D. Isabel de Sousa Neto, from noble families linked with early colonization, and involved in the governance of the village (later Captaincy) of Praia. He was 8 years old at the time of the great 24 May 1614 earthquake that leveled the village and surrounding parishes, resulting in the destruction and death in the area of Ramo Grande.

Following family tradition, at 24 years of age, on 4 July 1627, he was nominated to one of the four militia companies in the Captaincy of Praia. Two years later, in 1629, he left on a royal fleet, participating the battles in the north-east region of Brazil, after Dutch forces invaded.

On returning to Terceira, King Philip III of Portugal, by royal charter (dated 15 September 1636) he was nominated as the Captain-major and provisioner of the fortifications of Praia, positions that his father exercised 30 years previously. On the same occasion the King made him Knight in the Order of Christ.

=== Restoration Wars ===
On 3 December 1639 he departed for Portugal, remaining in Lisbon for a year, where (on 1 December 1640) he was present for the Restoration of Portuguese independence, and acclamation of the Duke of Braganza, D. John as King John IV of Portugal. In the company of nobles who supported the new monarch, Câmara was confided the mission of returning to the Azores, without any military support, to organize and motive the Azoreans to acclaim John as Portuguese sovereign in the Azores. With this task, he received from John IV royal letters addressed to the authorities of the islands, in addition with the authorization to negotiate with Spanish forces still on the islands (including promises in the name of the Crown for compensations and honours), for them to peacefully surrender.

==== Acclamation ====
He arrived in Terceira on 5 January 1641, disembarking a night in Porto Martins. The next day travelled to his father residence, to whom he confided his mission and political allegiances. After some hesitation, almost a month after arriving on the island, and with little enthusiasm from the nobility, he went into hiding after Spanish forces after his plans were relieved. Through intermediaries, he tried to make an accord with the Castilian governor, Field Master D. Álvaro de Viveiros, offering him the title of Count and 10,000 cruzados for him to surrender the fortress in Angra. The proposal was, naturally, badly received and Francisco Ornelas left the city of Angra for Praia, escaping Castilian forces trying to arrest him.

D. Álvaro de Viveiros who, since 1627, was the military governor at the fortress, realized that the local population was turning against the Castilian forces, and prepared the defences, stockpiling ammunition and foodstuffs for a blockade. Although popular news, the notice of John IV's acclamation in Lisbon had left the nobility and Angran elites with trepidation as to their future, fearful of a repeat of the bloodbath that occurred following the disembarkation in the bay of Mós in 1583. This uncertainty made it impossible for Angra to change allegiances, and an impasse developed.

Francisco Ornelas decided, therefore, to acclaim the new King from Praia, farther away from the fortress and less dependent on the Angrense aristocracy. He invited the municipal council, all the captains of the jurisdiction, clergy, nobility, clerics from the convents and informed them of his intentions. With their general approval, they prepared the acclamation. On 24 March 1641, which fell on the Palm Sunday, following mass, in the Santa Cruz churchyard, Francisco Ornelas acclaimed John IV as King of Portugal, swearing fidelity and allegiance. The local populous joined in, and immediately they paraded through the streets of Praia, yelling "Viva" and acclamations to the new King. The news of the proceedings circulated throughout the island, and days later, in Angra, António do Canto exclaimed in public the same cry to the new King, raising an agitation in the citizenry and causing some Spanish reactions. But, as the settlers began to become hostile, the soldiers removed themselves from the city and blockaded themselves in the fortress, until reinforcements arrived from Spain. Then fortress artillery began to bombard the city. The citizens of Angra requested support from Praia, and Francisco Ornelas organized troops of the Captaincy of Praia to march on Angra. He forces arrived within the day in Praça Velha where the encountered 1500 members of the local militia garrisoned.

==== Siege ====
In the municipal hall, an extraordinary meeting was held to decide on the tactics for the upcoming battle. João de Bettencourt was nominated governor and Captain-major of Angra, swearing allegiance to and declaring the supremacy of King John IV, on 31 March in the Sé Cathedral. From the fortress the new governor received the gift or artillery shells. Terceirense forces dug in, establishing trenches that cut across Alto das Covas and isthmus of Monte Brasil, initiating the Guerra do Castelo. Although there were multiple sortés and attempted assaults, the battle was even-sided, making victory immediately difficult. As news spread to the other islands of the regal acclamation, forces began arriving from the towns and cities in the archipelago, but there were no reinforcements from the continent (although the King did send his well-wishes and thanks to his loyal forces), as the battles on the continent consumed resources of their own. On 20 June 1641, Francisco Ornelas da Câmara received a letter from the King of Spain (Philip IV of Spain), who ordered him to obey his forces, forgave the insurrection and offered titles and honours for breaking the blockade.

Meanwhile, attempts to communicate by sea with Spain succeeded, and by summer, a nau commanded by D. Luiz de Viveros (the military governor's brother), disembarked troops in the promontory of Santa Catarina. Aware of the situation, Francisco de Ornelas da Câmara sent troops to imprison D. Luiz de Viveros, his officials and soldiers, thereby mitigating the possible counterattack.

As the blockade and battle continued, famine began to set in within the castle. Along with military officers, their families and children were overcome by lack of food and began eating domesticated animals and rats. After the malnutrition, disease began to spread, along with deaths, forcing D. Álvaro de Viveros to open negotiations in order to surrender with honour. As summer arrived, with water reserves low, hope of a reinforcements by sea disappearing, and with famine and death spreading, D. Álvaro de Viveros capitulated on 4 March 1642. On 15 March, the castle was delivered into the command of the Portuguese, and the Spanish (with their arms and flags) were sent to Vigo on boats provided by the people of the island.

==== Restoration ====
On 21 March, Francisco Ornelas da Câmara departed for Lisbon bringing word of the island's acclamation and rendition of Spain. He was received at Court with applause and the King, grateful for his service granted him the title of Commander of São Salvador de Penamacor. After remaining at Court for a few months, at the beginning 1643 he became sick, and learning of his father's death, returned to the island of Terceira.

Following his return, he was involved in a complex Court intrigue, associated with the delay in obtaining the acclamation, and the conditions that were negotiated during the Spanish surrender. He was condemned, but owing to his justifications and conduct, the supreme tribunal of the Casa da Suplicação da Corte declared Francisco's exemplary service as vassal, which was also confirmed by royal decree.

Francisco Ornelas da Câmara, who was devotee of the Cult of the Holy Spirit, and to commemorate his exoneration, he promised to annually contribute barefoot, a large bodo do Espírito Santo, and build in Angra a hermitage in honour of the Holy Spirit. He eventually constructed, along Rua dos Quatro Cantos, a chapel, a precursor of the today's impérios. He also incorporated into his coat-of-arms the white dove of the Holy Spirit.

As a sign of the King's recognition for his service during the restoration on Terceira, in a letter dated 13 February 1644, King John IV nominated Francisco Ornelas as Captain-major and provisioner for the town of Praia, in which he was invested on 4 May of the same year.

On 1 October 1659, owing to the difficulties associated with the recruitment problems, Francisco departed with his son Braz de Ornelas with 300 soldiers for the continent. When he arrived in Lisbon, he was received by Queen D. Luísa de Gusmão, then regent in name of her son (the futuro Afonso VI of Portugal, who recognizing his loyalty, spoke on her great appreciation. On 4 February 1660, he was nominated to the position of military governor of the Fortress of São João Baptista. On his return to Terceira, on 16 August, he took-up the position and began residing with this family, being received by artillery fire. During this phase, he was nominated to the position of Captain-major of Praia on 16 July 1663.

=== Later life ===
He died in the village of Praia, on 28 April 1664 at the age of 57, and was buried in the chapel of the parochial church of Santa Cruz, as stipulated in his will.

As Gervásio Lima noted:

"The island Terceira had in it an illustrious citizen, a meritorious patriot, esteemed by the Portuguese Court and well-regarded by the monarchs that he served...His memory will always be respected and greeted with applause and admiration."

The central square in the city of Praia da Vitória, road and the principal primary school in the municipality were named for this patron. In the church courtyard, in the place where the youthful Francisco Ornelas declared his loyalty to King John IV, a monument was erected in his honour.
