= Fort of Santo António do Monte Brasil =

Fort in the Azores

- Forte de Santo António do Monte Brasil
- Terceira, Central, name=Azores in Portugal
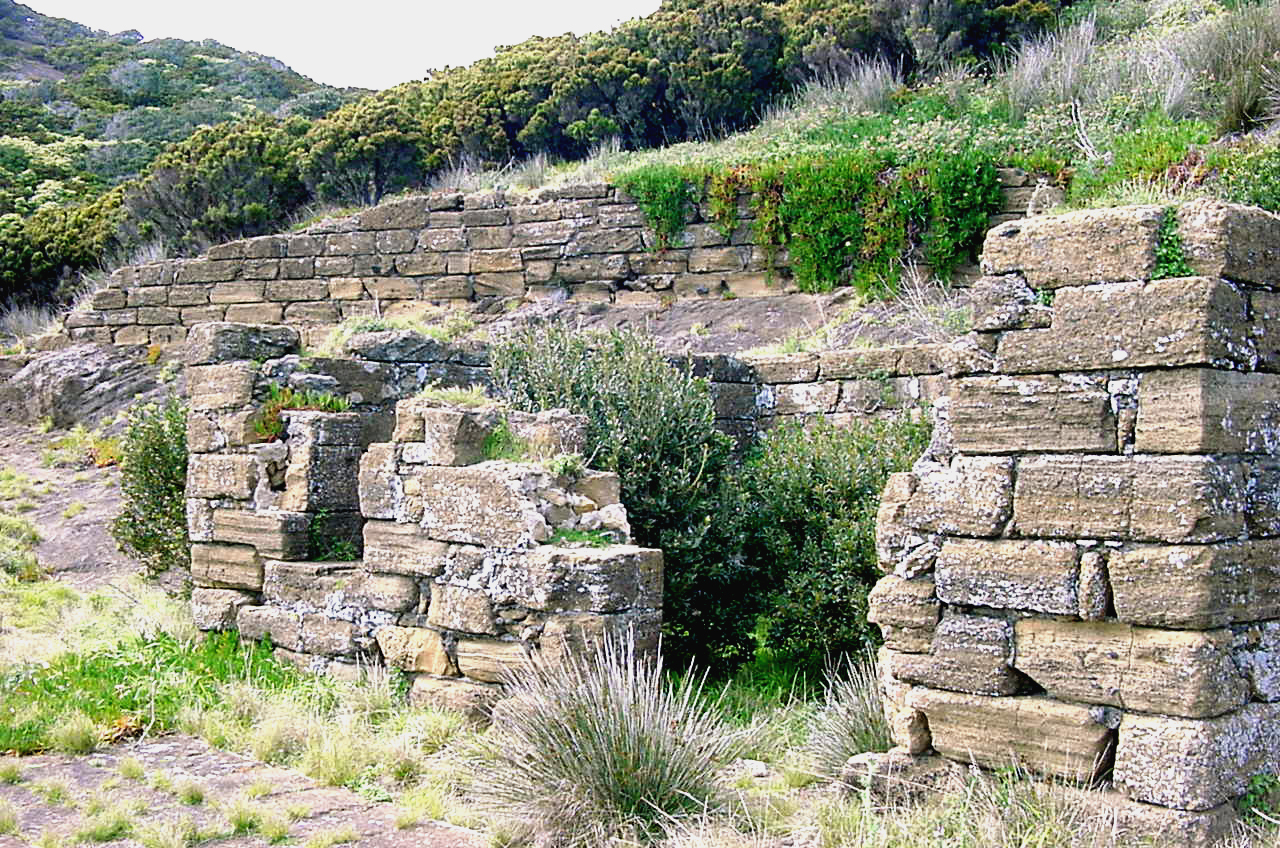
- The ruins of the fort of Santo António do Monte Brasil

Site information
- Type: Fort
- Owner: Portuguese Republic
- Operator: Junta de Freguesia da Sé
- Open to the public: Public

Location
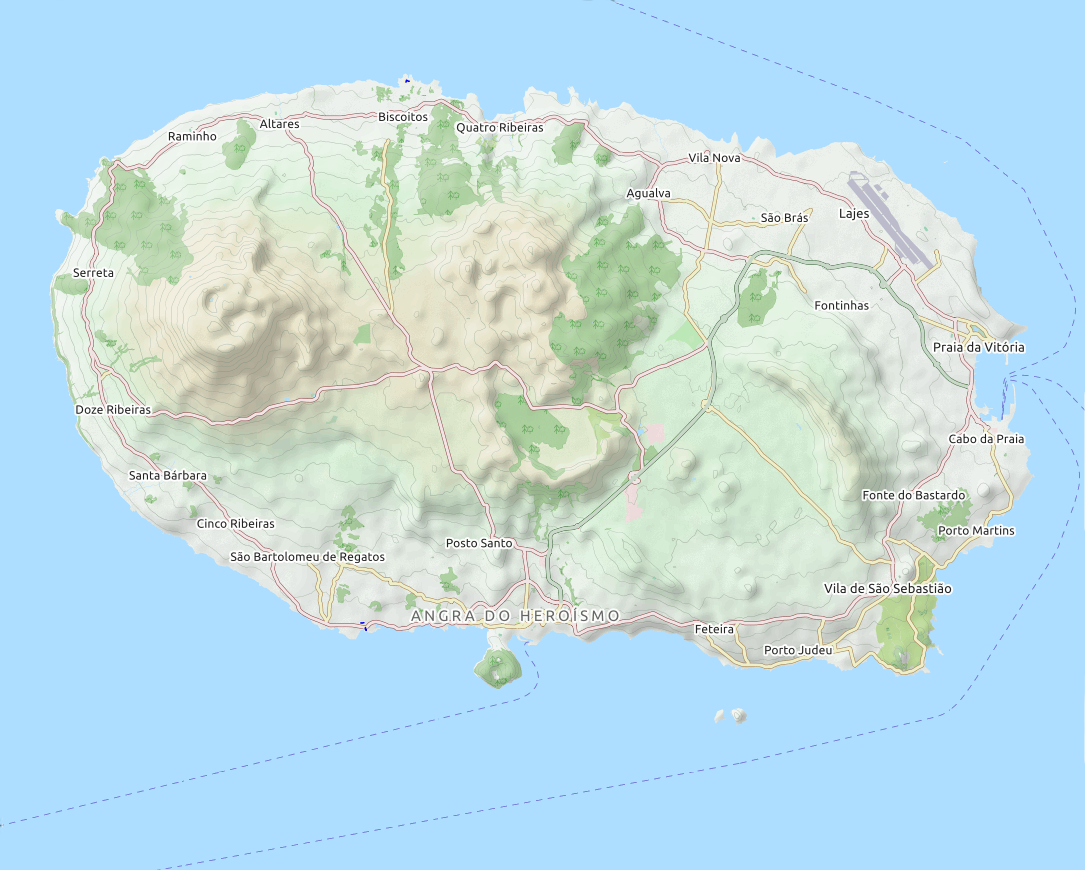
- Location of the fort within the municipality of Angra do Heroísmo
- Coordinates: 38°38′41″N 27°14′0.7″W

Site history
- Built: 16th century
- Materials: Basalt

The Fort of Santo António (Portuguese: Forte de Santo António), also known as the Redoubt of Santo António (Portuguese: Reduto de Santo António), is located on the peninsula of Monte Brasil, in the civil parish Sé, in the municipality of Angra do Heroísmo, along the southern coast of Terceira, Portuguese archipelago of the Azores. It is part of the complex of defensive structures of the Fort of São João Baptista, that crossed-fire with the Fort of São Sebastião in the defense of the Bay of Angra.

== History ==
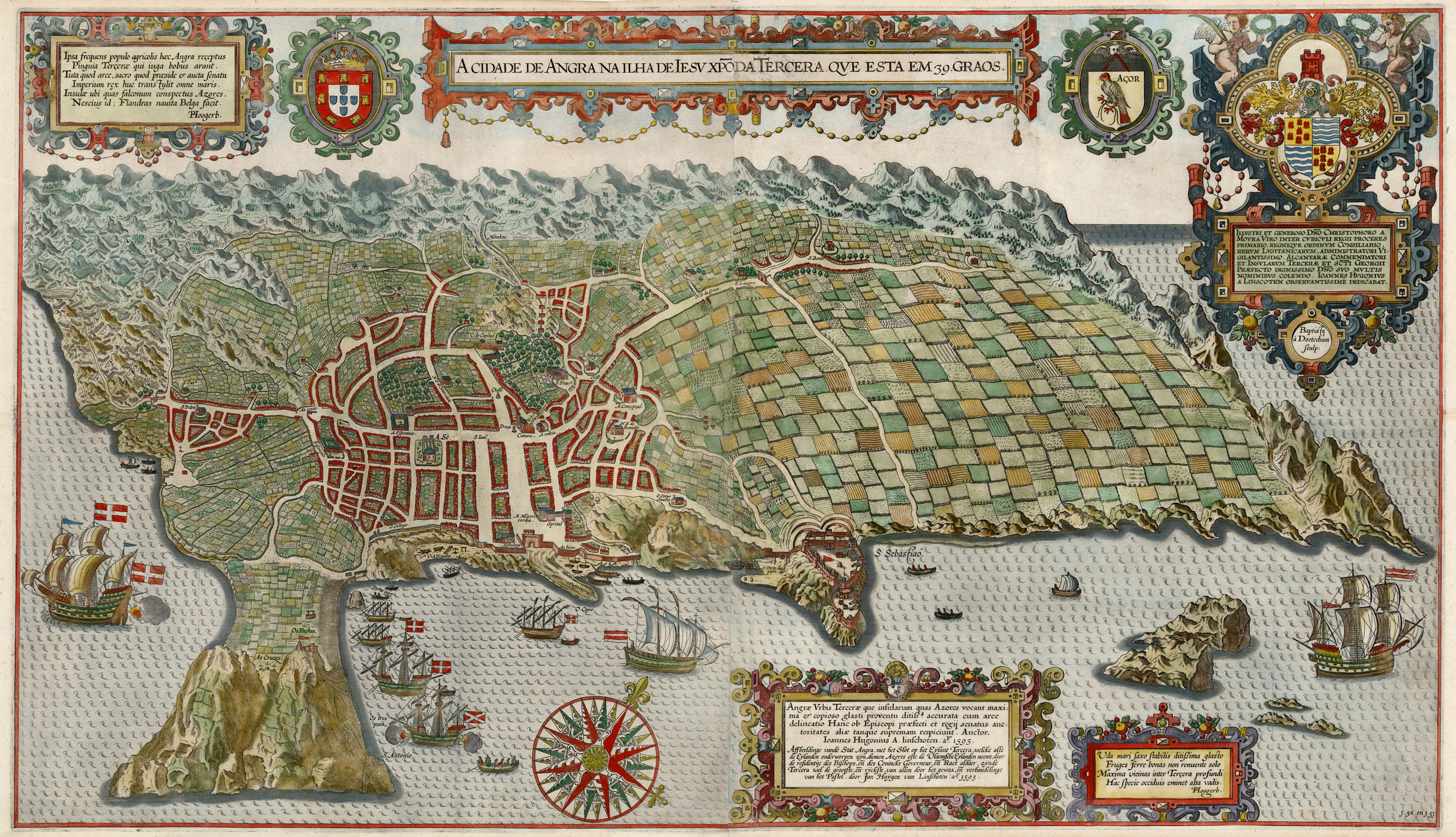
The drawing by Linschoten (1595), showing the Cidade de Angra na Ilha de Jesus (The City of Angra on the island of Jesus)

The redoubt was constructed following the Portuguese succession crisis of 1580 by the Corregedor of the Açores, Ciprião de Figueiredo e Vasconcelos, from the defensive plans of Tommaso Benedetto (in 1567), after attacks by French corsair Pierre Bertrand de Montluc in Funchal(October 1566), and the 1566 attack and defense of Angra.

"There did not exist at that time [of the Succession Crisis of 1580] anywhere along the coast of the island of Terceira any fortress, except that of São Sebastião, on every southern curtain that had been made some redoubts and stations, in the places susceptible to enemy disembark, under the indication and plan of engineer Tomás Benedito [Tommaso Benedetto], who in his diligence had since the year 1567, after, following the events of 1566, the French, commanded by the terrible pirate Caldeira, barbarously sacked the island of Madeira, and intended to the same on this island, where it appears they were repelled by force of our arms.".

Francisco Ferreira Drummond, registered that:

"One of the fortresses that experience showed of great necessity, was that that Ciprião de Figueiredo ordered built at the point of Monte Brasil, to the east, because near it passed the salvos of the carracks of the armies, without being damaged; because the castle of São Sebastião was distant and closer to land, and in the evening they could come around the mountain to attack, and rob the ships anchored in the port. This fort was given the name Santo Antóino, in the name of new King who was named [António I of Portugal], making its captain Baltasar Gonçalves de Antona, noble citizen of Angra, whom we discussed in the year 1576 was alderman in the council. At the other point in the southern part, erected a fort called Zimbreiro."

In the 1595 engraving "A Cidade de Angra na Ilha Iesu Xpo da Terceira que esta em 30 Graos", by Jan Huygen van Linschoten, the fort was depicted.

In the context of the installation of the Captaincy-General of the Azores, its state was reported in the 1767 dispatch::"17 — Redoubt of Santo António. This redoubt has seven batteries, of which there are found 21 pieces, 18 in bronze...and three of iron, of the same condition: it requires another 12 pieces with its repairs. This is the principal defence, which is at the entrance to the port. In the lower battery the lower wall angle is ruined, requiring repair."

Sousa (1995), in 1822, while writing of the port of Angra referred: "...and [the point of] Santo António in the west, [where there is a castle] of the same force [40 pieces]..."

== Architecture ==
By the 20th century, little of the fort survived; segments of the walls and bunker are the only elements of this redoubt that remain on Monte Brasil.
