= Cemetery of Anchors =

Subaquatic archaeological site

- Cemitério das Âncoras
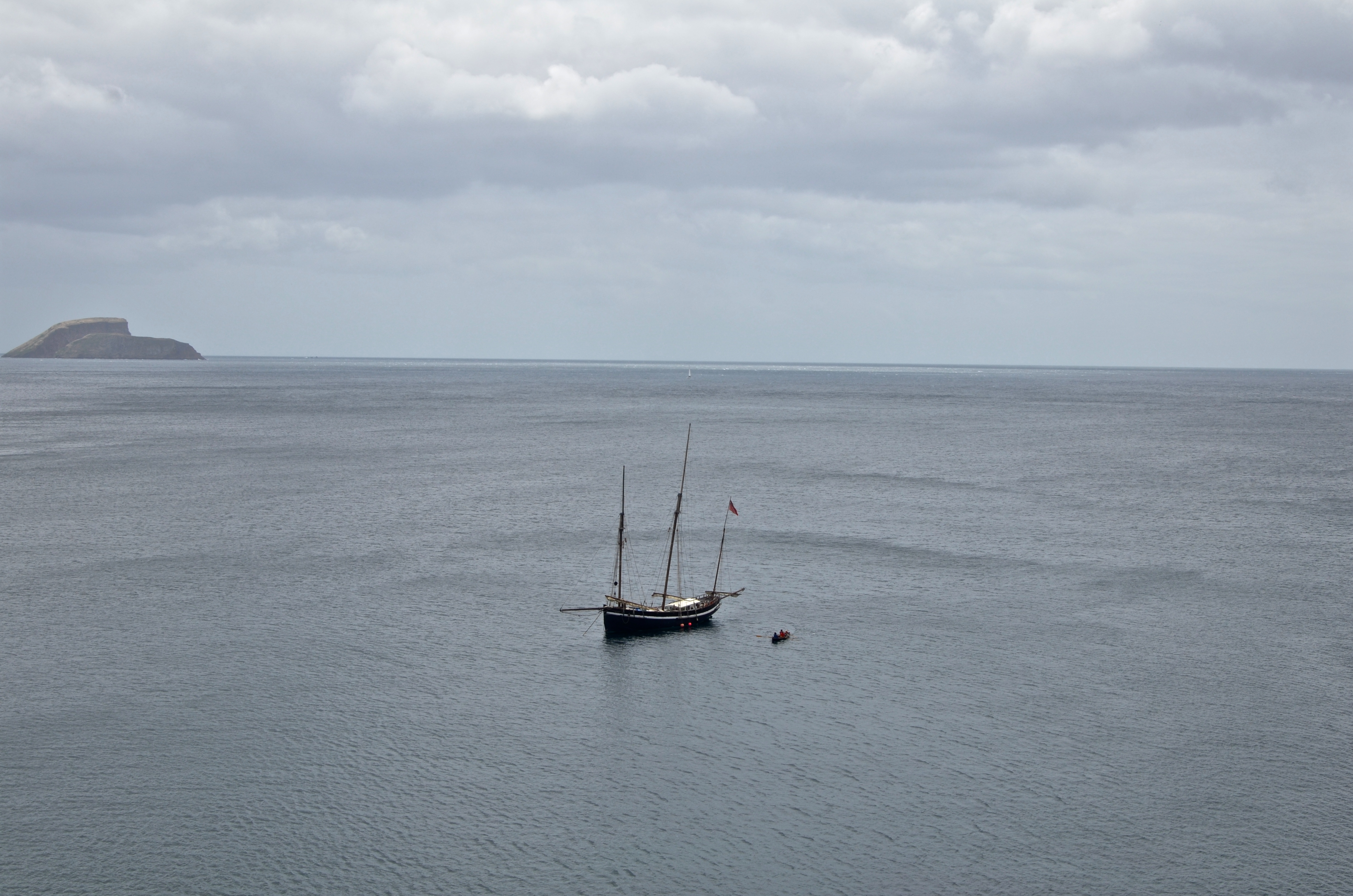
- A view of the Bay of Angra
- Interactive map of Cemetery of Anchors
- Location: Bay of Angra
- Nearest city: Angra do Heroísmo
- Coordinates: 38°39′0.23″N 27°13′9.36″W
- Designation: April 10, 2006
- Authorized: December 10, 2005
- Operator: Regional Directorate for Culture
- Owner: Regional Government of the Azores
- Administrator: Regional Secretariate for Culture
- Website: culturacores.azores.gov.pt/pasa/

The Cemetery of Anchors (Portuguese: Cemitério das Âncoras) is a subaquatic archaeological site, situated within the Bay of Angra, in the civil parish of Sé, municipality of Angra do Heroísmo, on the Portuguese island of Terceira, in the Azores.

== History ==
Historical reference indicate that wintering by boats in the shelter of Angra were dangerous, owing to the fury of storms. Many ships were buffeted and lost their anchors by the violent swells that buffeted the "shelter" of the provincial capital, if they were not sunk outright. Approximately 74 shipwrecks or sinkings occurred in the Bay of Angra between 1522 and 1996.

A great number of these shipwrecks have not yet been encountered, and today only 13 archaeological sites within Bay of Angra have been discovered. Two of them were in an excellent state for exploration, geotourism and provided geocultural characteristics of great museological significance. Consequently, the regional government, following an exhaustive study and surveying in the site of Lidador (a steamship bound for Brazil but which sunk in 1878) and the Cemitério das Âncoras, which became known as the old anchorage for the Port of Angra, established a subaquatic parque. This Parque Arqueológico Subaquático da Baía de Angra (Archeological Subaquatic Park of the Bay of Angra) was established on 12 October 2005 to preserve and promote the histo-cultural significance of the Bay to life in Angra do Heroísmo.

== Geography ==
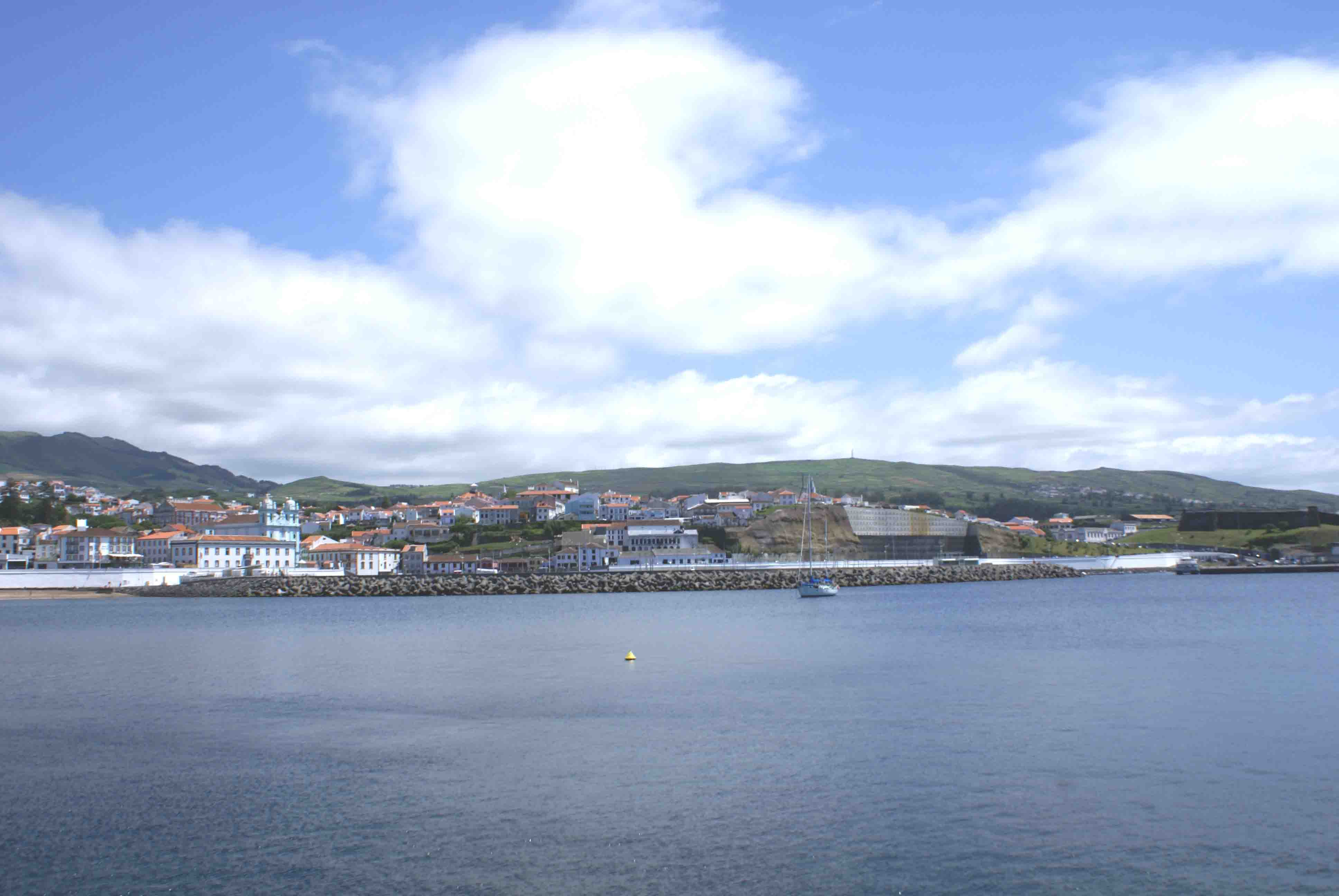
A view of the Bay of Angra, with a buoy marking the dive site to the Cemetery of Anchors

Its limits extend from the Fort of São Benedito until the eastern edge of Monte Brasil, along the second line of defensive walls that protected the mountain, for approximately 500 metres (1,600 ft). The depth at which the artefacts and ruins exist varies from 22 metres (72 ft) (in an area of rocks) until 32 metres (105 ft) (in an area of sand).

Divers can reach the site by boat, and the area is classified as a medium scale of difficulty, owing to the depths involved. Although maritime currents are not strong, the area is identified by surface buoys: the area falls within the port-control zone associated with the Porto das Pipas, and is conditioned by boat movements.

It is possible to observe a variety of anchors, from various periods of history, but specifically between the 16th and 20th century. There are approximately 40 examples of anchors from different boats from these periods. Many of the objects in the bay are testaments to past shipping accidents, committed by pilots that were unfamiliar with the characteristics of the bay. In many cases those pilots, always desperate to avoid shipwrecks would cut their lines in an attempt to find the open sea. By doing this, they hoped to avoid the dangerous southern or south-eastern winds, locally known as "ventos carpinteiro" (carpenter winds), since after shipwrecking the ships' wood would be reused by locals as building materials.

Three minutes by boat from the Port of Angra are two buoys, indicating the subaquatic park. The northerly buoy provides access to achor 555, some 16 metres (52 ft) , supported over a large rocky block. Continuing southwest are various anchors, from different periods, until a vertical wall that is located near the beach. At 35 metres (115 ft) there is also an enormous inverted anchor.

=== Biome ===
In addition to the archaeological interest of the subaquatic park, the area is also an important registry of oceanic species and marine flora. From a medium depth of 15 metres (49 ft) to approximately 35 metres (115 ft), the bottom of the bay includes rock and sand. The conditions provide useful characteristics for underwater photography, including geological features and maritime species. Since it is not considered a dangerous local area, diving both in the day and evening are possible. Here there are several marine species that are frequently visible: such as Whiteseabream or Sargo (Diplodus sargus), Common bream (Pagellus acarne), Dusky Groupers (Epinephelus marginatus), Mediterranean moray (Muraena helena), Salema porgy (Sarpa salpa), Almaco jack (Seriola rivoliana) and Common stingrays (Dasyatis pastinaca).
