= Dois Paus redoubt =

Fortification in the Azores

- Reduto dos Dois Paus
- Terceira, Central, Azores in Portugal

Site information
- Type: Fort
- Operator: Portuguese Army
- Open to the public: Private

Location
- Location of the fortification within the municipality of Angra do Heroísmo, island of Terceira
- Coordinates: 38°38′55″N 27°13′14″W

Site history
- Built: 1543
- Materials: Basalt, Tuff

The Dois Paus redoubt (Portuguese: Reduto dos Dois Paus) is a redoubt fortification situated on the peninsula of Monte Brasil, in the civil parish of Sé, in the municipality of Angra do Heroísmo, in the Portuguese archipelago of the Azores. It was part of the fortified defenses of the Fortress of São João Baptista.

== History ==
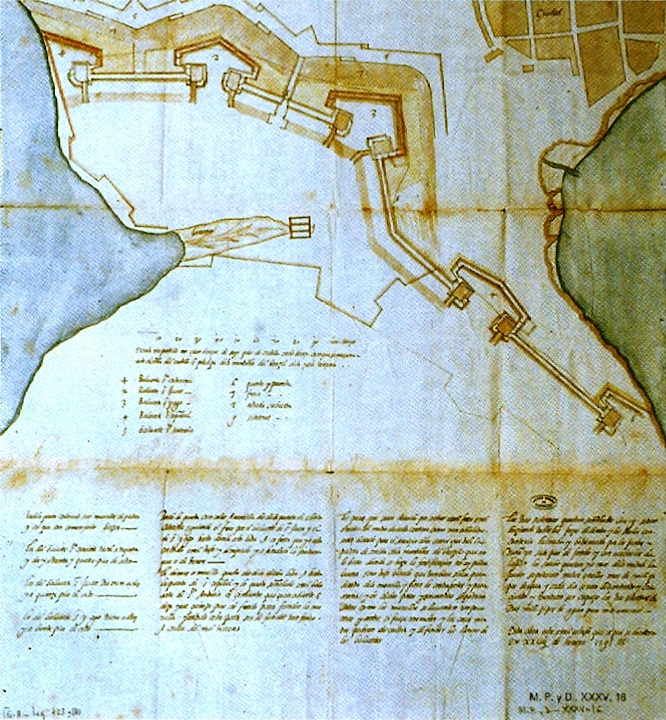
A 1595 map of the fortress of Monte Brasil

Bartolomeu Ferraz first presented his recommendations to John III of Portugal in 1543 for the fortification of the Azores, then an important waypoint in trans-Atlantic commerce between the Indies and America. On 5 March 1567, in his proposal to the Crown, Engineer Tommaso Benedetto elaborated a plan to protect the island's coastal defence, that included the construction of a fort on Monte Brasil. Shortly following this proposal, the Portuguese Crown began the construction of the Fort of Dois Paus, in order to protect the port of Dois Paus-Portinho Novo. It is unclear from where its name originated; the name "dois paus" is a literally translated as "the redoubt of the two sticks/clubs".

In the context of the Captaincy-General of the Azores, there was a reference to the structure, stating in 1767:

"...In the redoubt of Dois Paus there are three canon emplacements and two pieces...it needs one more with its support."

Its remains continue to lie on the volcanic cone of Monte Brasil to this day, in ruins.
