= Siege of São Filipe =

1641 siege

- Part of Portuguese Restoration War
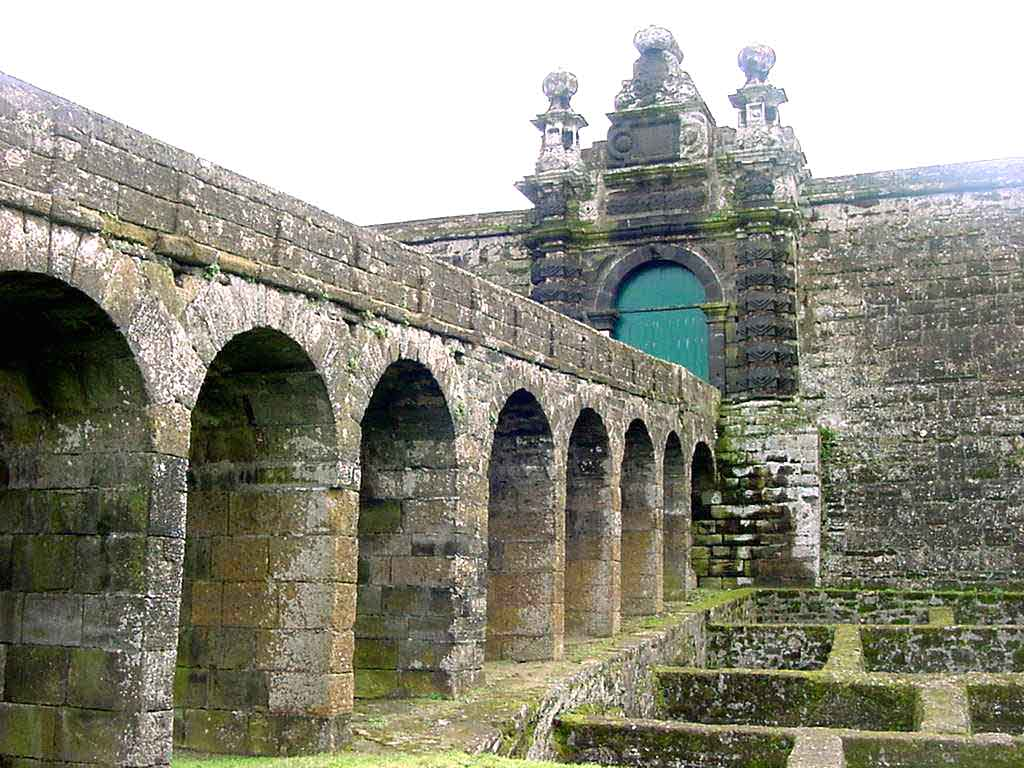
- The main entrance of the fortress
Date	27 March 1641 – 4 March 1642
Location	Near Angra, Azores, Portugal
Result	Portuguese victory
Territorial changes	Spanish ousted from the Azores

Belligerents
Portugal	Spain

Commanders and leaders
(Portugal) Francisco de Ornelas	(Spain) Álvaro de Viveros

Strength
Unknown	530 men

Casualties and losses
145 men killed 172 men wounded	342 men killed 20 men wounded

The siege of the Fortress of São Filipe, was a battle fought from 27 March 1641 to 4 March 1642 as part of the Portuguese Restoration War, near Angra, Azores, between Spanish and Portuguese over the control of the fort of São Filipe.

After 11 months of intense fighting the Portuguese were victorious and the Spanish garrison was defeated with very heavy losses.

== Sources ==
- Lourenço, Paula.Battles of Portuguese History – Defence of the Overseas. – Volume X. (2006)
