= Fortress of São João Baptista (Angra do Heroísmo) =

Portuguese fortification

- Fortaleza de São João Baptista
- Terceira, Central, name=Azores in Portugal
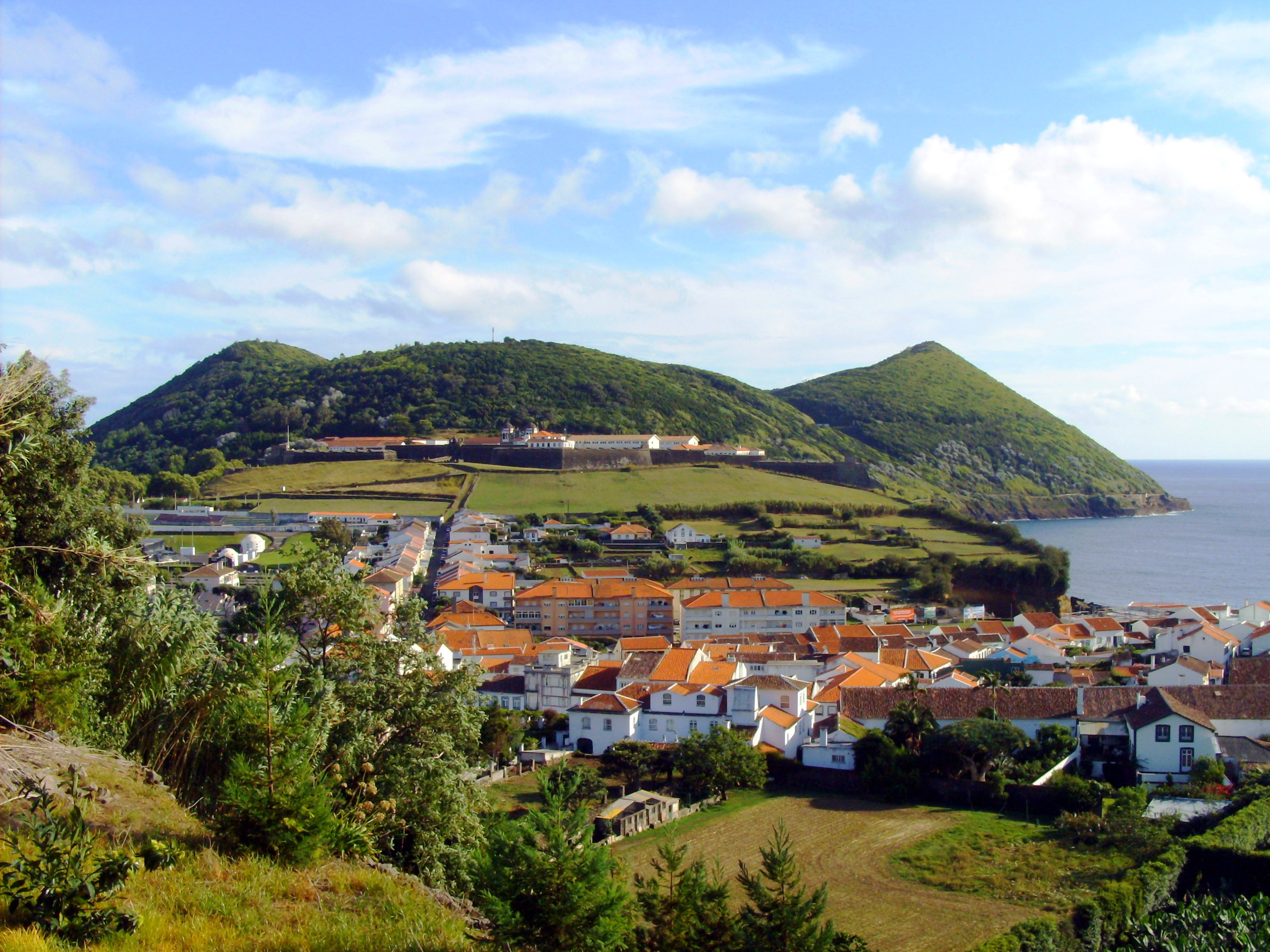
- The Fortress of São João Baptista on the slope of Monte Brasil, in the city centre of Angra do Heroísmo

Site information
- Type: Fort
- Owner: Câmara Municipal de Angra do Heroísmo
- Operator: Forças Armadas de Portugal
- Open to the public: Private

Location
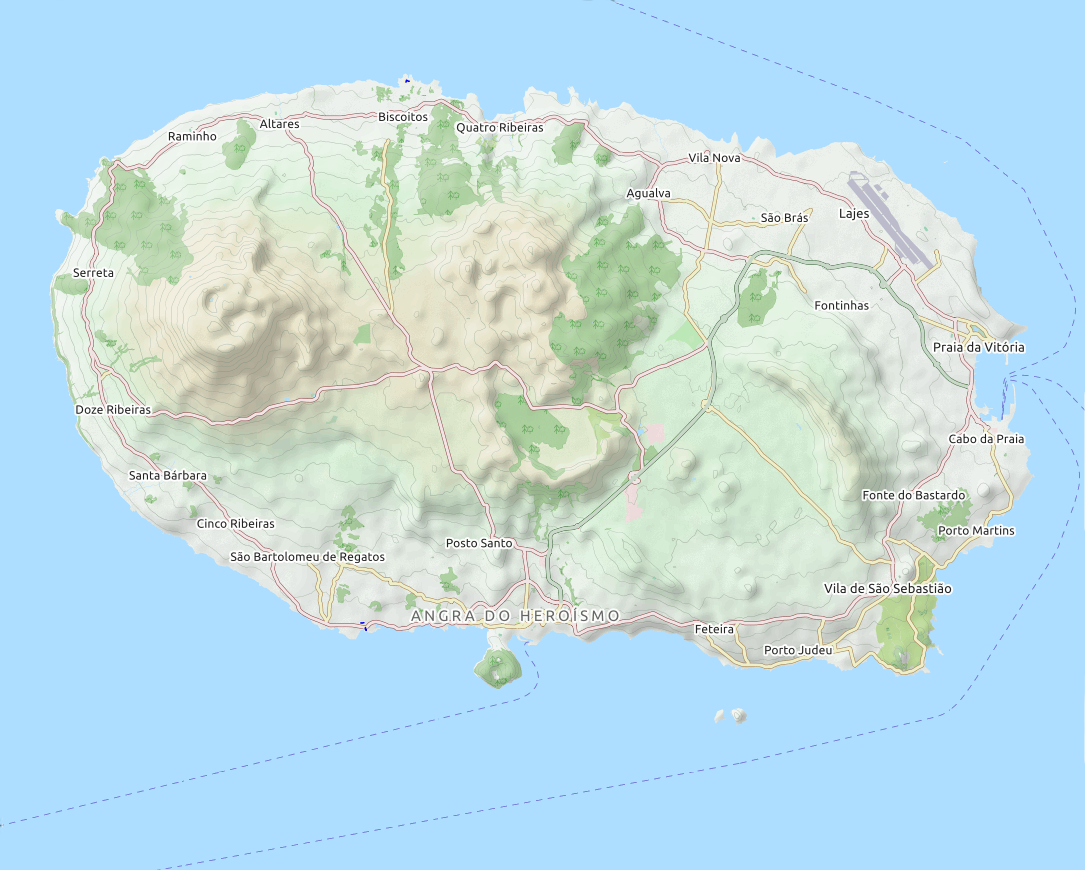
- Location of the fortification within the municipality of Angra do Heroísmo, island of Terceira
- Coordinates: 38°39′5.19″N 27°13′36.71″W

Site history
- Built: c. 1567
- Materials: Basalt, Tuff

The Fortress of São João Baptista (Portuguese: Forte de São João Baptista), also known as the Fort of São Filipe or Fort of Monte Brasil, is a historic fortress and defensive emplacement, located in the civil parish of Sé, municipality of Angra do Heroísmo in the Portuguese island of Terceira, archipelago of the Azores.

== History ==
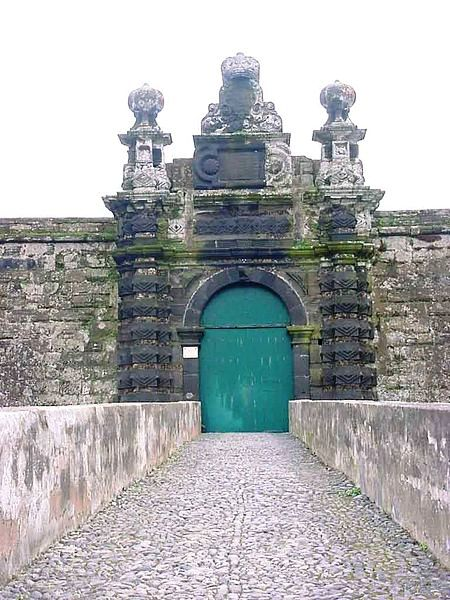
The main entrance to the Spanish Fortaleza de São Filipe

A defense study for the Azores began in the middle of the 16th century by military engineer Bartolomeu Ferraz: in his report to the Portuguese Crown, he indicated that the islands of São Miguel, Terceira, São Jorge, Faial and Pico were vulnerable to attacks by pirates and Protestant privateers (primarily English, French and Dutch), and its ports and village required better security conditions.

It was during the reigns of John III (1521–1557) and Sebastian (1568–1578) that the first defensive plans were drawn-up by the Italian architect and military engineer Tommaso Benedetto (in 1567), who elaborated a plan of global defense for the main islands of the Azores. Further, it was his opinion that, should an enemy attack from the sea, that defenses should be concentrated at the ports and anchorages, defended by the local population, under the responsibility of each municipal authority.

The final plan for Angra do Heroísmo and Terceira included elaboration of the coastal defenses at the Fort of São Sebastião (or the Castelinho as it is known), the Porto das Pipas and the Fort of São Sebastião (in the area of Ribeira Seca); the plan was later continued by Ciprião de Figueiredo e Vasconcelos, then governor of the islands, to encompass over fifty defensive works along the coast of the island.

=== Iberian Union ===
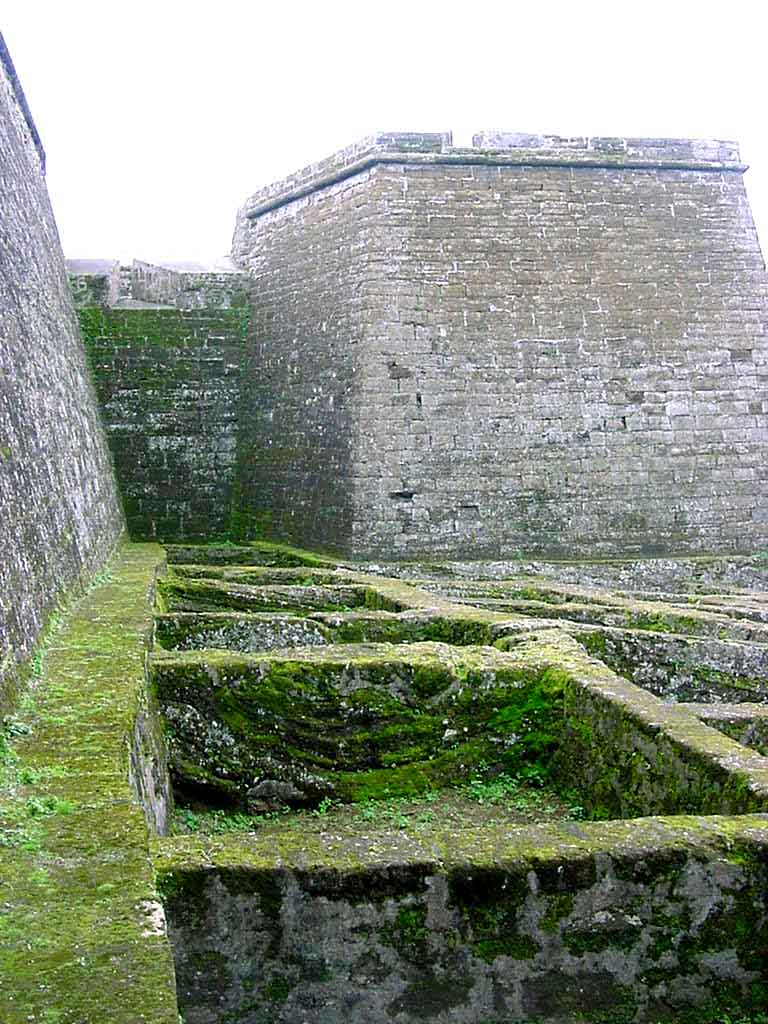
The walls of the bastion of São Pedro, the main gun emplacements at the fort

During the Iberian Union, the fortifications in the Bay of Angra were at the centre of the Azores and a strategic route between the goods of India and the Orient and the markets of Europe (comparable to the complex fortifications that were constructed in Havana (in Cuba) and Cartagena (in Colombia) during later epochs).

The fort was erected after the conquest of Terceira by the Spanish military, as a consequence of the events related to the Iberian Union (1580–1640), when, under command of Álvaro de Bazán, 1st Marquis of Santa Cruz, King Philip II of Spain (Philip I of Portugal) retook the island from the forces of António, Prior of Crato. With the start of Anglo-Spanish War (1585–1604), it was strengthened as privateers, such as Francis Drake (1587) and Robert Devereux, 2nd Earl of Essex, whose adjunct Walter Raleigh, attacked the neighbouring settlement in Horta, during the summer of 1597. The new project served to two functions:

- to protect the port of Angra and the colonial fleet that sheltered in its waters, from assaults by Barbary Coast pirates and English privateers, especially when ships from India and the Orient used the islands as a staging port for the return trip to the continent; and
- to garrison Spanish troops, in order to defend the island (which would be under the authority of the Marquess of Santa Cruz).

The construction started in 1593, with the first cornerstone at the Santa Catarina bastion (northwest angle) in a ceremony presided by the Governor of the Presidio, António de la Puebla, and the Bishop of Angra, Manuel Gouveia. The final engineering plan was overseen by the Italian military engineer Giovanni Vicenzo Casale and his assistants, the Sienese engineer Tibúrcio Spannocchi and Anton Coll (Antão Colla), who had planned the design in 1590. Essentially, the defensive plan was elaborated by Spannocchi, who conceived of the design after visiting the location in 1583–1584, but its position on Monte Brasil was planned by Coll, who since its foundation accompanied the work in Angra (until his death in 1618). Ostensibly, the work began in 1594. Later the engineers Girolamo Francès and Giovanni Battista Cairati (who was the royal architect in the court of Philip II of Spain) participated in this project, renaming the fortress the Fortaleza de São Filipe (in his monarch's honour).

Due to various problems, the construction continued into the government of Diogo Fajardo (1628–1639). At this time, the three interconnected cisterns (with a capacity of 750,000 kilograms), stables (on the site of the Governor's palace) and the chapel of Santa Catarina de Sena (which was later re-baptised in honour of the Holy Spirit).

The built environment was completed with local boulder stone and basalt by rocksmiths and masons, and a great part of the labourers were actually men condemned to the gallows. Others were soldiers from the presidio who were being punished and were, by Governor Diogo de Miranda Queiroz (who started the practice), obligated to participate in the work. Although this type of punishment reached its extremes during the governorship of Diogo Fajardo, it is debatable where hundreds of local Azoreans were forced to work in the project. Regardless, it is known that many Terceirenses and local islanders supported the construction of the fort through taxes and tithes.

=== Restoration ===
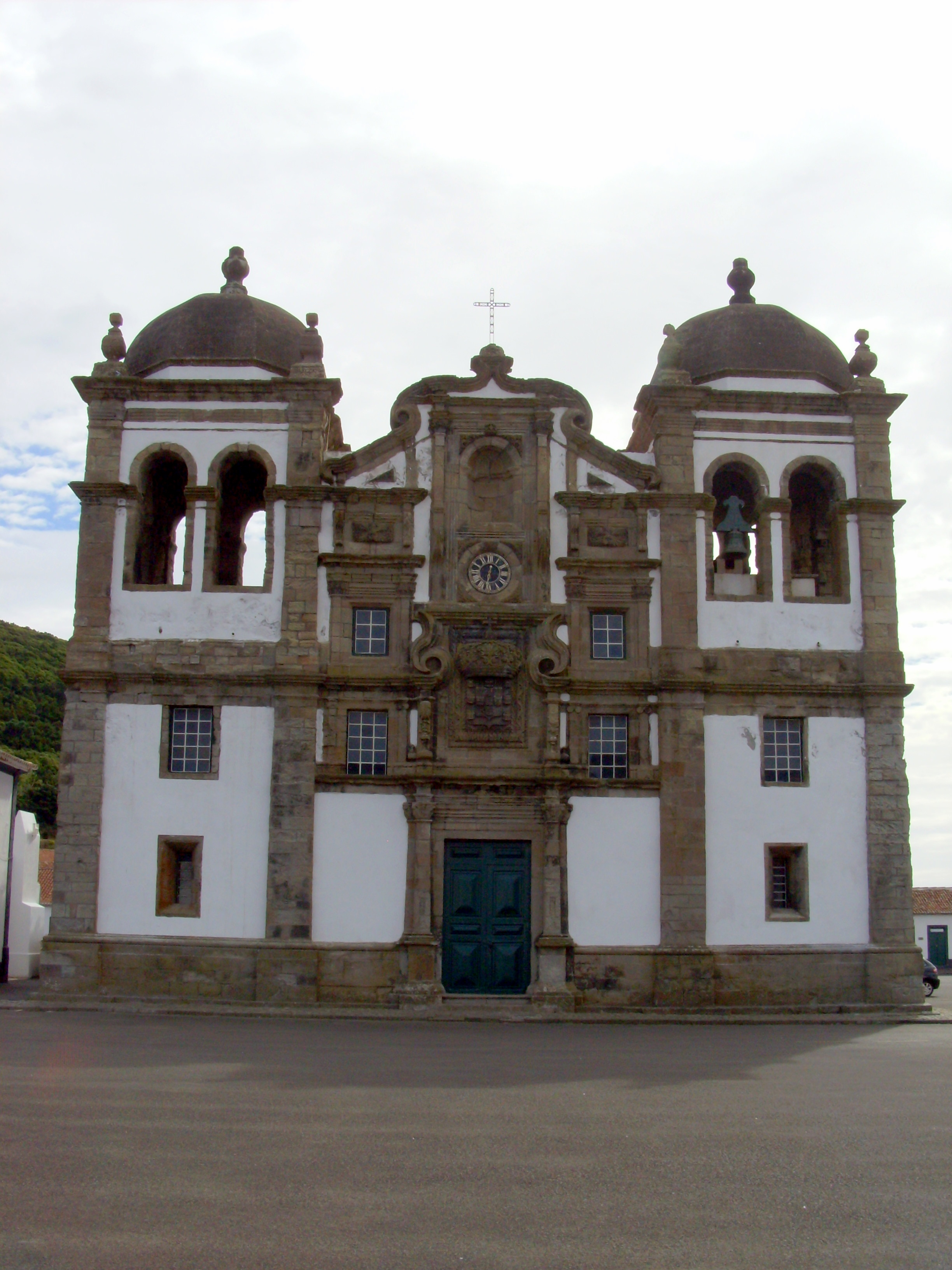
The Church of São João Baptista (c1645) constructed after the Restoration of Portuguese independence

During the Portuguese Restoration (1640), Spanish forces, under the command of field-commander Álvaro de Viveiros, resisted for eleven months (from 27 March 1641 to 4 March 1642). It was only with the multi-island force commanded by Francisco Ornelas da Câmara and João de Bettencourt that the deadlock was broken, and the forces capitulated. Surrendering with military honour, the Spaniards were permitted to retreat with their personal arms and two bronze artillery pieces, along with their munition. They left behind 138 steel and bronze cannons, 392 arquebuses, 400 muskets and their associated munitions.

With the recapture of the fort, it was rechristened to the invocation of John the Baptist (Portuguese: São João Baptista), homage to John IV of Portugal; the church was later constructed to honour their patron saint in 1642.

In 1658, one of the bastions were repaired (although its unclear which), while in 1662 reconstruction and renovation was completed that were expensive (comparable to almost the same costs associated with the soldiers and officers).

In the second half of the 17th century, the gunpowder magazine supported the fortifications in the rest of the island. Within the citadel, single soldiers, married couples (some with families) and retired officers/enlisted lived together. Along the flanks of Monte Brasil the groups maintained plots of land for a subsistence agriculture. At the end the century, the religious Brotherhood to the Cult of the Holy Spirit was one of the richest in the city.

At the beginning of the 18th century, Father António Cordeiro, writing of the community Angra and the citadel within the Fortaleza de São João Baptista:

"To the east there run many roads, or quarters of homes in rock and lime, of two-stories, and that can house 50 soldiers and ordinarily have 300 neighbours...The city of Angra has six parishes, (which includes the noble population that is in the great Castle, and which has a main chapel..."

But, progressively, within the century, some of its spaces were being used for training, which lasted until the 19th century.

By 1720 the craftsmen had completed the remodelling work on the church, which was at a time that the fortress had 60 active emplacements.

=== Liberal Wars ===
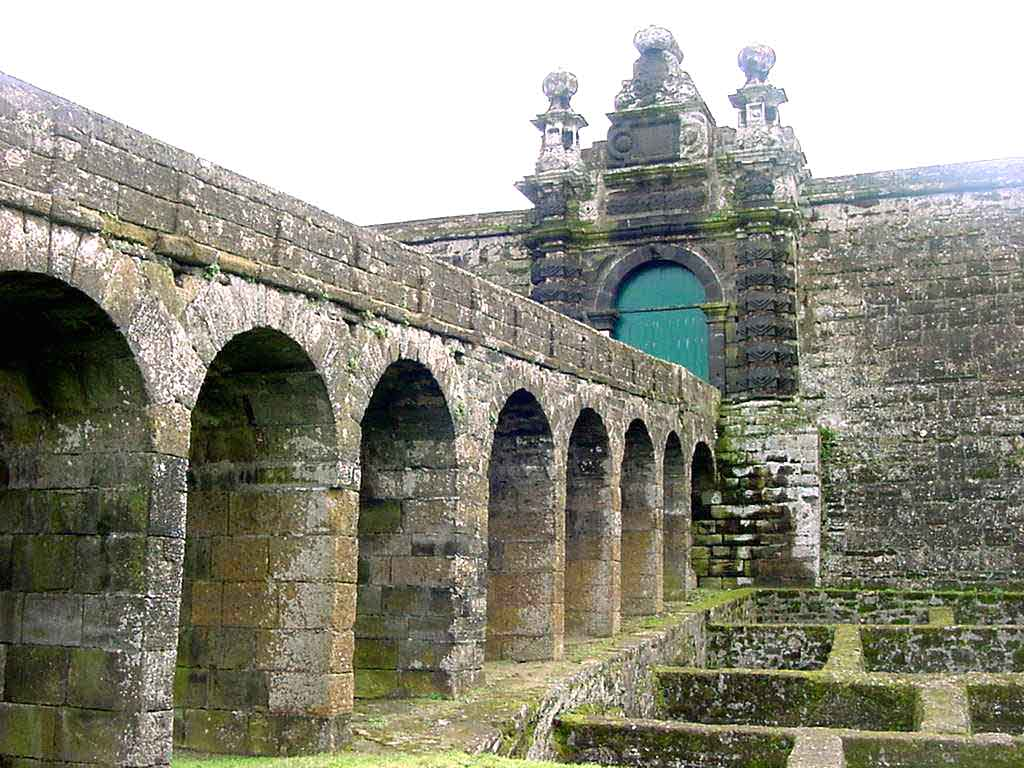
The main entrance to the fort showing the elaborate portico of volcanic rock

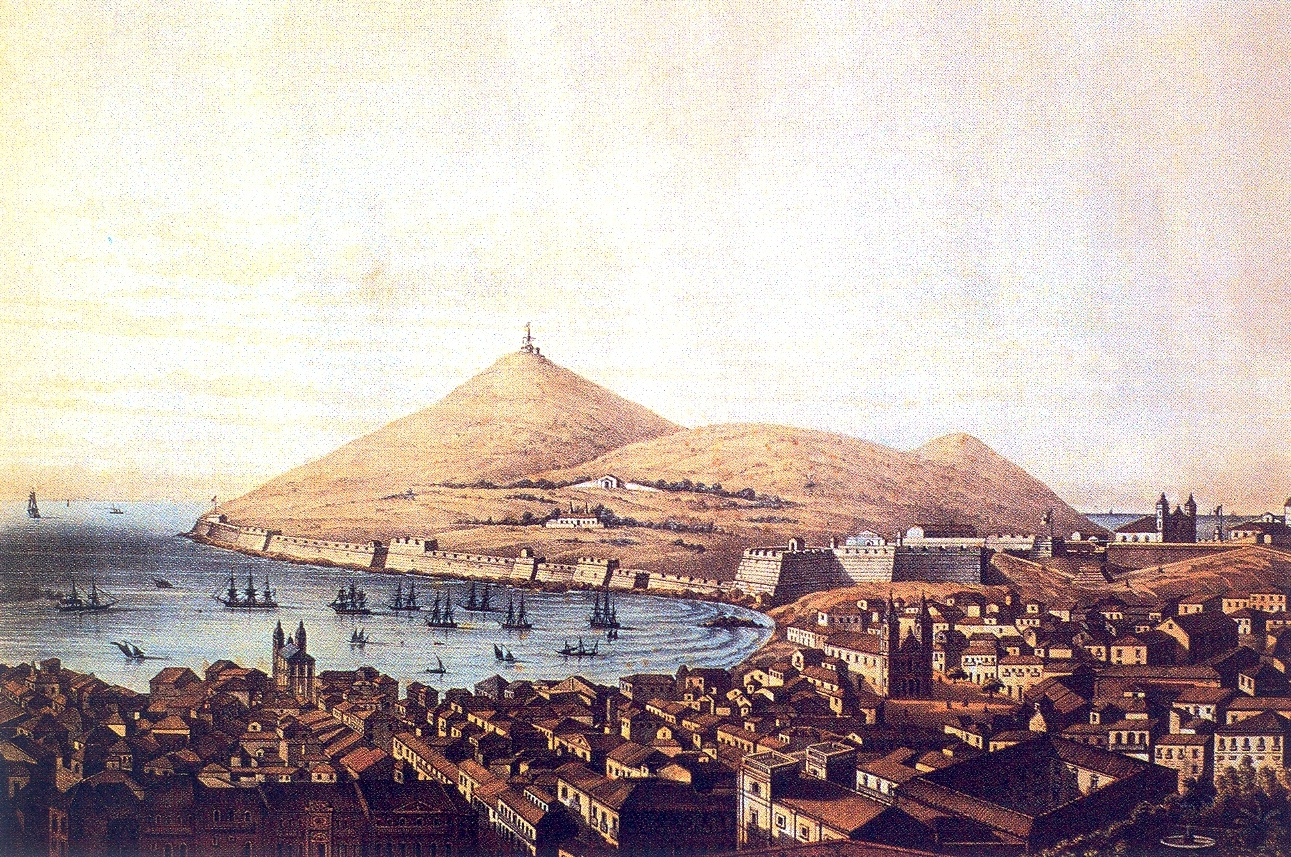
"A Baía de Angra do Heroísmo, Ilha Terceira, com embarcações e a Fortaleza de S. João Baptista". (1850) Engraving, Biblioteca Nacional do Brasil, Rio de Janeiro

Following the Porto Liberal Revolution of 1820 that ushered in the Liberal movement, the fort was the site where the first Liberal forces took power, under the command of Captain-general, brigadier Francisco António de Araújo e Azevedo (2 April 1821). It was also here that the first counter-revolution was fought two days later (3–4 April 1821).

The Liberal government in Terceira established a money house within the fort (7 May 1829) to coin "malucos"(which were equivalent to 100 réis) for the government of the Prince Regent John: based on the same design coined in Rio de Janeiro during the exile. The year 1829 was also the year where, in conjunction with the Fort of São Sebastião, the Fort of São Baptista repelled an assault by a Miguelist squadron in the Bay of Angra.

Related to the success of the Liberal movement, during the tumult of the first battles of the Liberal Wars between Peter IV and his brother, Miguel, it was the 5th Infantry Battalion that restored the rights of Peter and Constitutional monarchy. The unit received a flag personally embroidered by Queen Maria II with gold-inlay for their services.

At the end of the century (1896), the fort was the permanent home of African King Gungunhana, who was politically imprisoned within its walls until his death on 23 December 1906.

=== 20th century ===
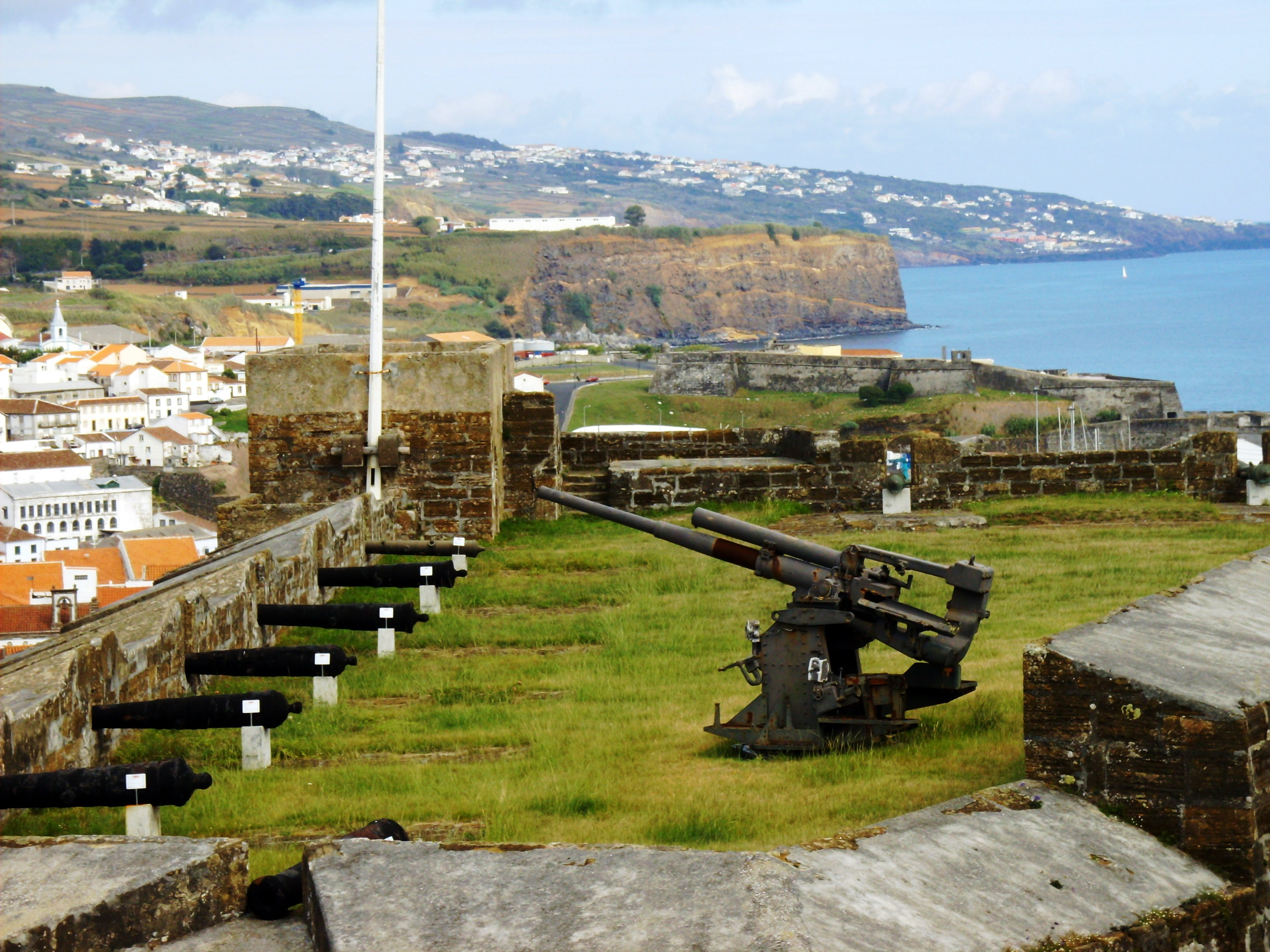
A modern military emplacement, remnants of the First and Second World Wars, now part of the open-air Armry Museum of the Museum of Angra do Heroísmo

At the outbreak of the First World War, Portugal was a neutral nation, but this progressively changed due in most part to its concerns over its dependencies and economic blockades with its main markets. Following a request by England to detain German nationals, Germany declared war on Portugal (which was reciprocated on 9 March 1916). The original detainees and subsequent German nationals were transferred to the Fortress of São João Baptista between 1916 and 1919 (the end of the War).

The use of the fort as a prison for political prisoners was continued during the Estado Novo regime: in 1933 a military presidio created and in 1943 a "Depósito de Presos de Angra" (deposit for Angran convicts) was also established.

By the middle of the century, a plan by the Comissão da Avaliação das Novas Infra-estruturas das Forças Armadas (CANIFA) (Armed Forces Commission on the Evaluation of New Infrastructures) demolished the buildings west of the fort and east of the Church.

Meanwhile, it became a communications centre (Centro de Comunicações da Armada) for the Portuguese Armed Forces, and later a radio antenna was erected to create and support Pico Rádio.

The remaining fortress complex was classified on 18 August 1943 as a Property of Public Interest (under decree No.32-973) by the Direcção-Geral dos Edifícios e Monumentos Nacionais (DGEMN) (General-Directorate for Buildings and National Monuments).

In 1956 the Serviços dos Monumentos Nacionais (National Monument Services) completed some renovations of the Church, while a recuperation of the fort began with a smaller conservation project in 1959.

As part of the historical centre, the Fort was included as part of the UNESCO designated World Heritage Site in 1983. Visitors to Monte Brasil, apart from the many walking trails, can be guided by members of the armed forces, who provide historical interpretation tours of its grounds.

Between 1995 and 1997 (on three separate projects) the walls of the fort were consolidated and strengthened.

In 1997, the Church of São João Baptista was completely renovated (including both interiors and exteriors). The reconstruction of the wall along the Bay of Fanal was begun in 2000, and completed by 2001, when the recuperation of the roofs of the hermitage of Santa Catarina were initiated. In 2011, the cost to repair and maintain the site was estimated at 100,000 Euros annually, which included maintaining the walls straight and spaces clean, yet costs associated with repairs to many of the buildings, drainage systems and water networks, electrical networks, was estimated at four million Euros.

== Architecture ==
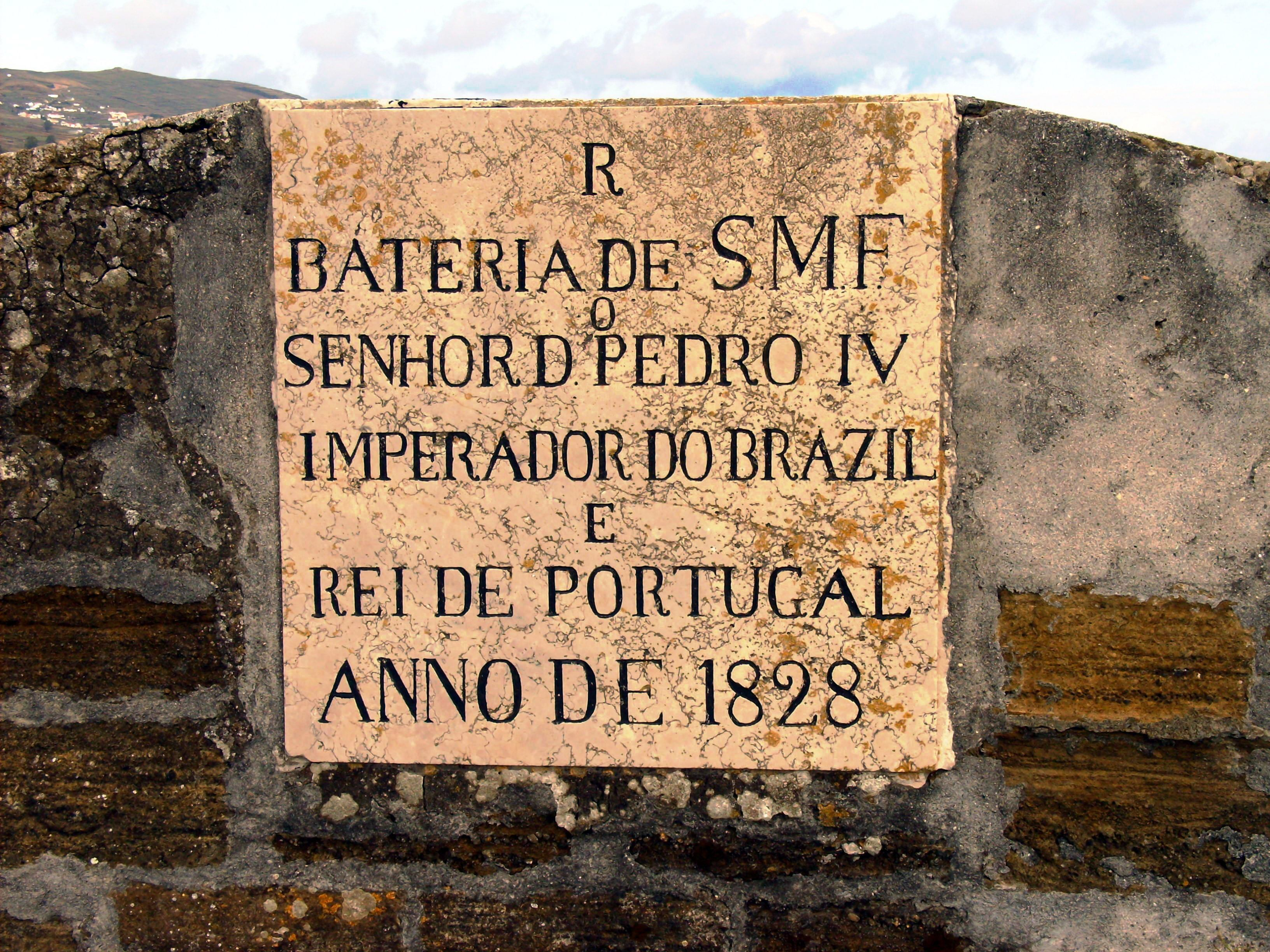
Bateria de D. Pedro IV (1828)

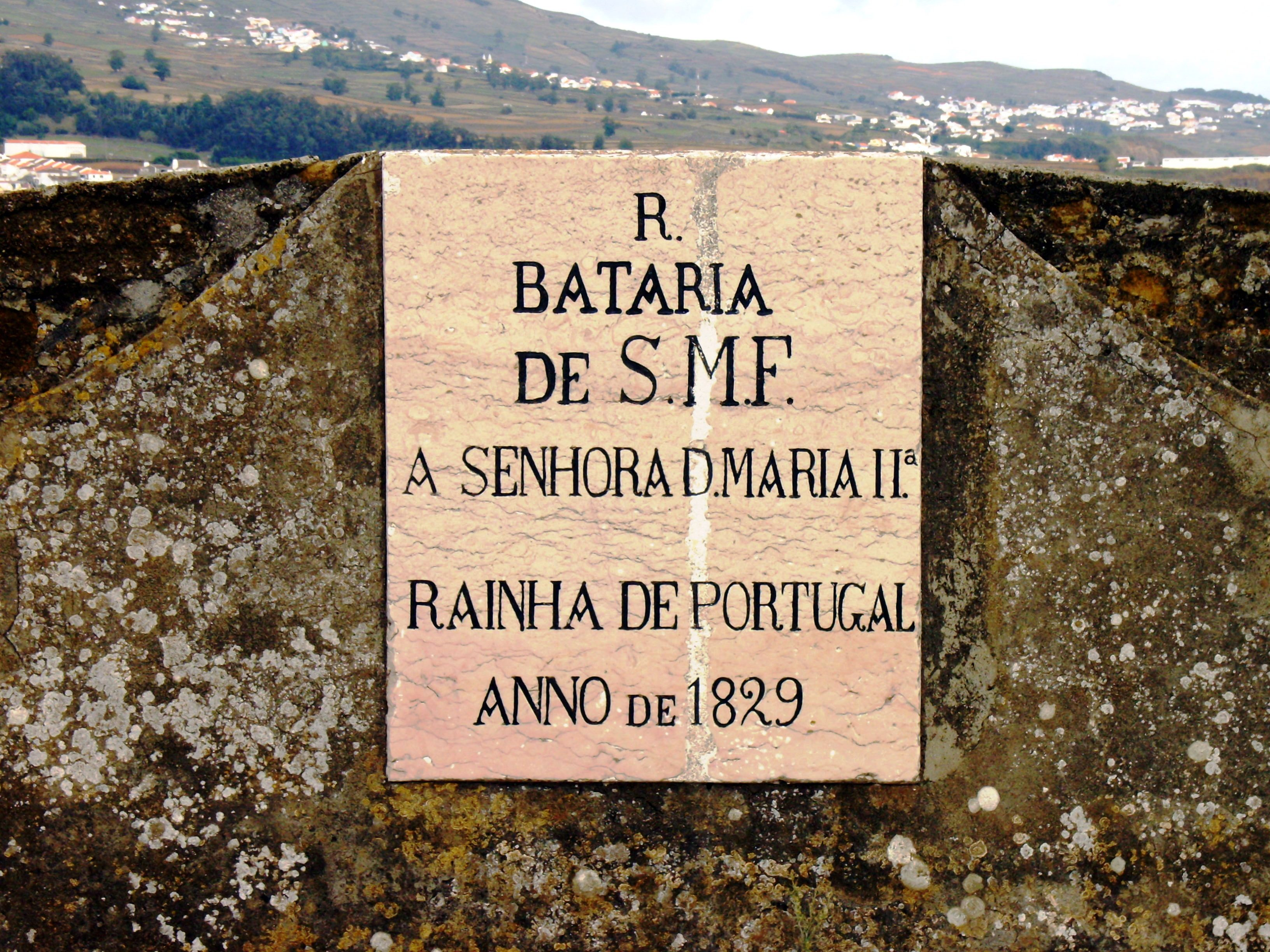
Bateria de D. Maria II (1829)

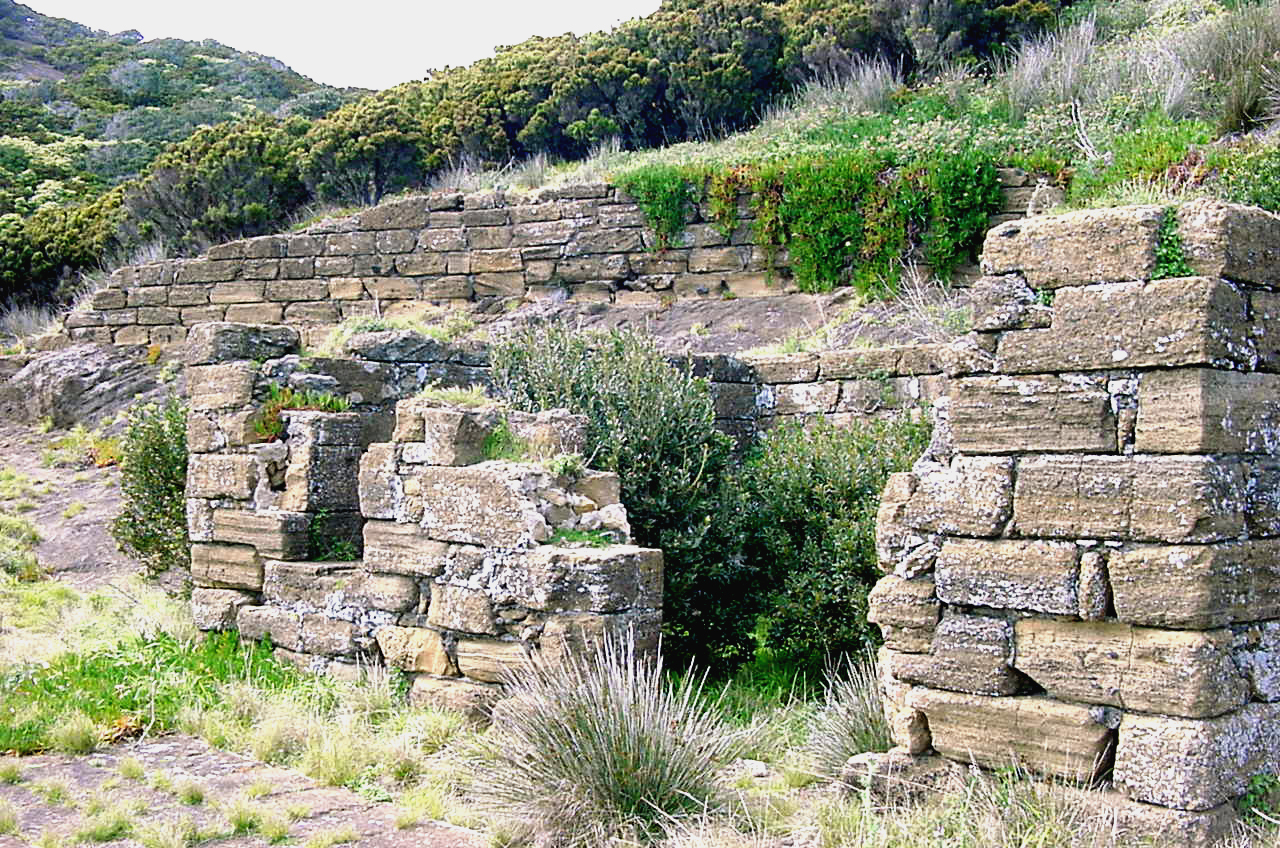
The remains of the Fort of Santo António do Monte Brasil

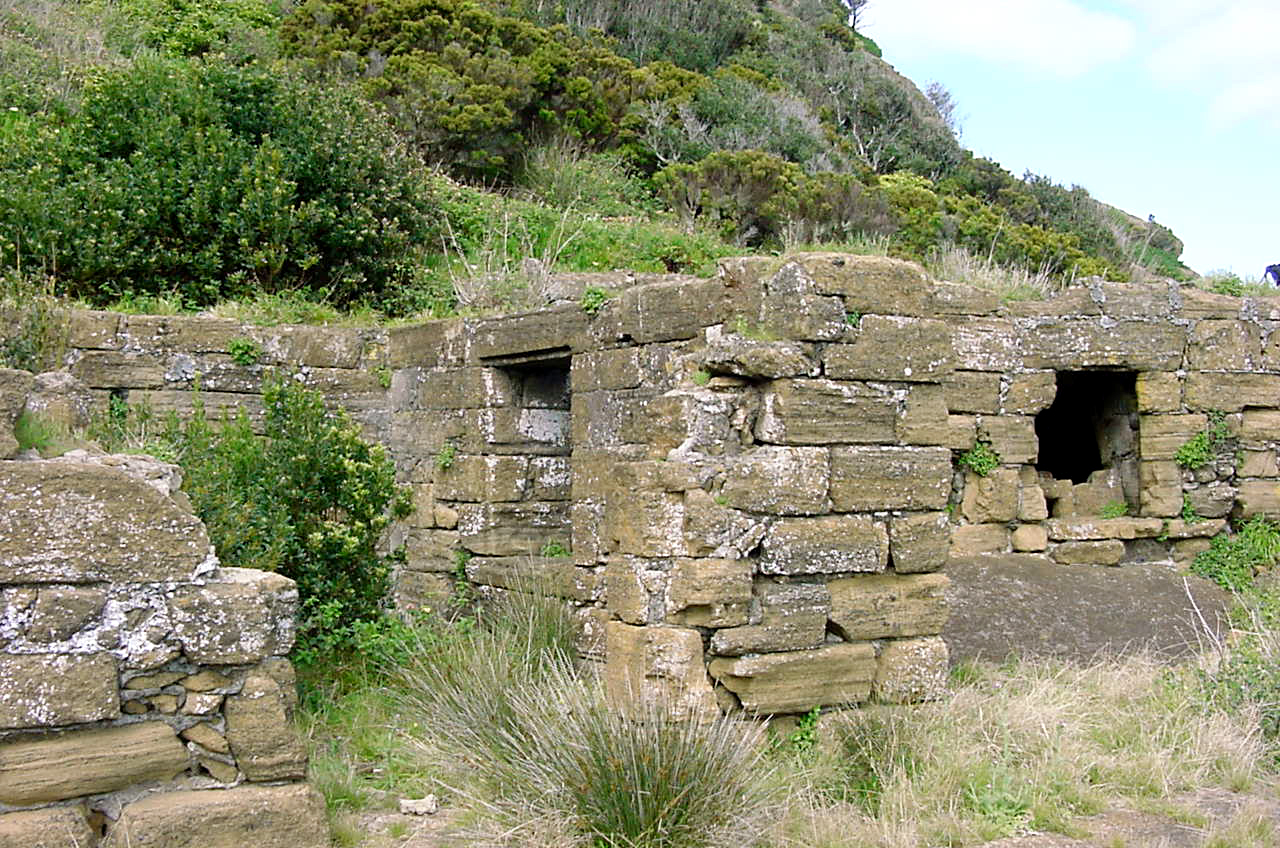
The ruins of the walls of the Fort of São Benedito

The fortress dominates the promontory of Monte Brasil, a volcanic cone situated along the southern coast of Terceira, at the extreme tip of the city of Angra linked by an isthmus, on either side of which it is surrounded by the Atlantic Ocean, and the bays of Fanal and Angra.

The actual structure covers an area of 3 km^{2} and is constituted a principal nucleus with a 111.5 metre long curtain of walls (three bastions and two partial-bastions) that extend 570 metres, to a maximum height of 15 metres and while at most 2.6 metres wide. Within these walls, some the lands was excavated to about 10 metres, and trenches (of equal depth) are located outside the walls. In addition, the edge of each the fort's limits are another two walls that encircle the peninsula.

The five bastions that reinforce the wall at the isthmus are, from west to east:

- Bastion of Santa Catarina (Saint Catherine), over the cliffs of Fanal, with seven cannon and crowned by the Torreão dos Mosquitos (a rounded lookout) used as a forward sight for the location's batteries with its own gunpowder magazine. It is connected by two levels of embankments (with four emplacements) to the Bastion of São Pedro;
- Bastion of São Pedro (Saint Peter), to the left of the Portão de Armas (main portico), with 15 cannon emplacements. Supported by its own magazine, the bastion in 1766 defended attacks with six cannons to the left and seven to the right of the main door.
- Bastion of Boa Nova (Good New), located along the São Pedro Bastion, contained 16 cannon, supported by two gunpowder magazines and the lookout at the Torreão da Bandeira (the lookout also served to hoist the imperial flag, hence its name). The bastion, which overlooks the Bay of Angra, was renamed (from a marble inscription on its battery) in the context of the Liberal Wars in honour of Peter IV of Portugal (Battery of Peter IV). Following this emplacement is the Battery of Maria II (similarly named in honour of Queen Maria II after the Liberal Wars), and later the Battery of Malaca which, at one time housed a bronze, 36-calibre cannon from the Fort of Diu (which was returned to Lisbon on 22 July 1771. From the Malaca Battery, by way of the arch of the Portão de Armas, a staircase descends to an old garden; and
- Bastion of the Espírito Santo (Holy Spirit), which overlooks the Campo do Relvão, where were located four cannons and three gunpowder magazines (one in the middle and the other two on either angle), linked to a wall with six cannons and one magazine, that end;
- Bastion of Santa Luzia (Saint Lucy), with five cannons and one magazine, that extend to two descending walls (with its own cannon emplacement and magazine). In addition, by 1849, another gunpowder magazine, referred to as the Paiol Novo, was constructed. Also located in this bastion, was the building of the artillery laboratory, which was actually a replacement for an older, larger building that was destroyed in a violent fire on 7 May 1821, resulting in five deaths.

On the western flank of the fort, near the Santa Catarina Bastion and over the Bay of Fanal, there also exists the Arsenal Battery with five other cannon emplacements.

The Santa Luzia Bastion is also connected by the one kilometre long Santo António wall, along the eastern coast of Monte Brasil, with several ancillary fortifications (from north to south):

- Gate of Portinho Novo;
- Gate of Porta do Cais da Figueirinha;
- Redoubt of Dois Paus;
- Redoubt of São Francisco;
- Fort of São Benedito do Monte Brasil (also the Redoubt of Três Paus);
- Redoubt of Santo Inácio; and
- Fort of Santo António do Monte Brasil.

Along the southeast of the peninsula, towards the open ocean, the defense was manned by the small Forte da Quebrada, dominated by the Vigia da Baleia lookout, while on the west coast, ancillary fortifications extended another kilometre (from south to north):

- Constituição battery;
- Fort of São Diogo do Monte Brasil (also the Fort of Zimbreiro);
- Fidelidade battery;
- Redoubt of General Saldanha;
- Redoubt of São Gonçalo;
- Redoubt of Santa Cruz;
- Redoubt of Santa Teresa; and the
- Cais do Castelo.

Within the fort four cisterns were constructed the arsenal and company of soldiers, including: the interior of the main castle (which alone had a capacity of 1,500 m³); another within the Fort of Santo António; in the interior of the Fort of Quebrada; and along the wall of the Zimbreiro Fort (where a grotto collects water annually).
