= Parque Arqueológico Subaquático da Baía de Angra do Heroísmo =

Archaeological site in Azores, Portugal

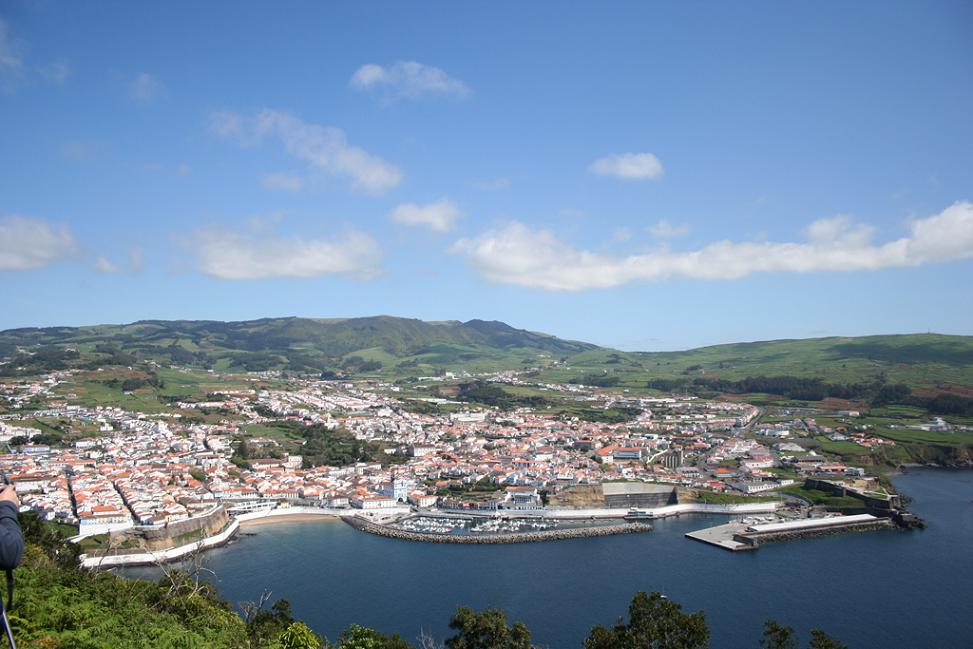
City and bay of Angra do Heroísmo, Azores

Parque Arqueológico Subaquático da Baía de Angra do Heroísmo is an underwater archaeology park located in the bay of Angra do Heroísmo, in the Terceira island, in the Azores.

It is a park formed by various archaeologic sites, some already studied and others still in study. The PIAS Project, that started on 2006, aimed to contribute to the study of the park, through investigation, monitorization, and valorization of the various archaeologic sites.

This underwater park, open to the public since 2006, indicates the strategic importance of the city of Angra do Heroísmo.

Historical data show that in the bay of Angra do Heroísmo there were, since 1552, more than 90 shipwrecks, and most of them haven't been located yet.
