= Bay of Angra =

Natural bay on Terceira, Azores

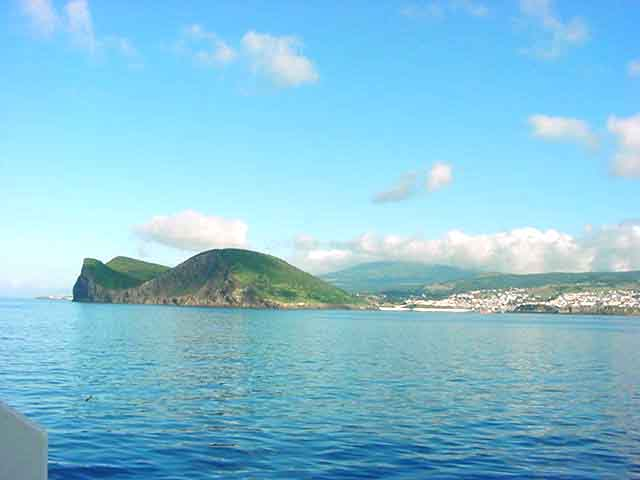
- A view of the bay of Angra, including Monte Brasil and the city of Angra do Heroísmo

- Location within Azores
- Location: Azores
- Coordinates: 38°39′N 27°13′W
- Ocean/sea sources: Atlantic Ocean
- Basin countries: Portugal
- Average depth: 40 metres (130 ft)
- Islands: Terceira
- Settlements: Angra do Heroísmo

Bay of Angra (Portuguese: Baía de Angra) is a natural bay within the coastal extent of the municipality of Angra do Heroísmo, on the Portuguese island of Terceira in the archipelago of the Azores. Within an average depth of 40 metres (130 ft), the bay has been of historical importance to the island; since the 15th century, it was a port-of-call for returning merchant shipping from the East Indies and Brazil, laden with gold, silver, porcelain, spices, rare woods, and other goods. These ships would anchor in the Bay of Angra until supported by armed escorts, which would accompany the ships on the rest of their voyage to Portugal. The Bay at Angra provided shelter from northern and northwestern winds; only storms originating to the south or southeast, posed a threat. Nonetheless, the Bay is the final resting-place of several ships affected by the adverse winds: local archives and a rich oral tradition support the foundering of many ships against the leeward shore.

== History ==
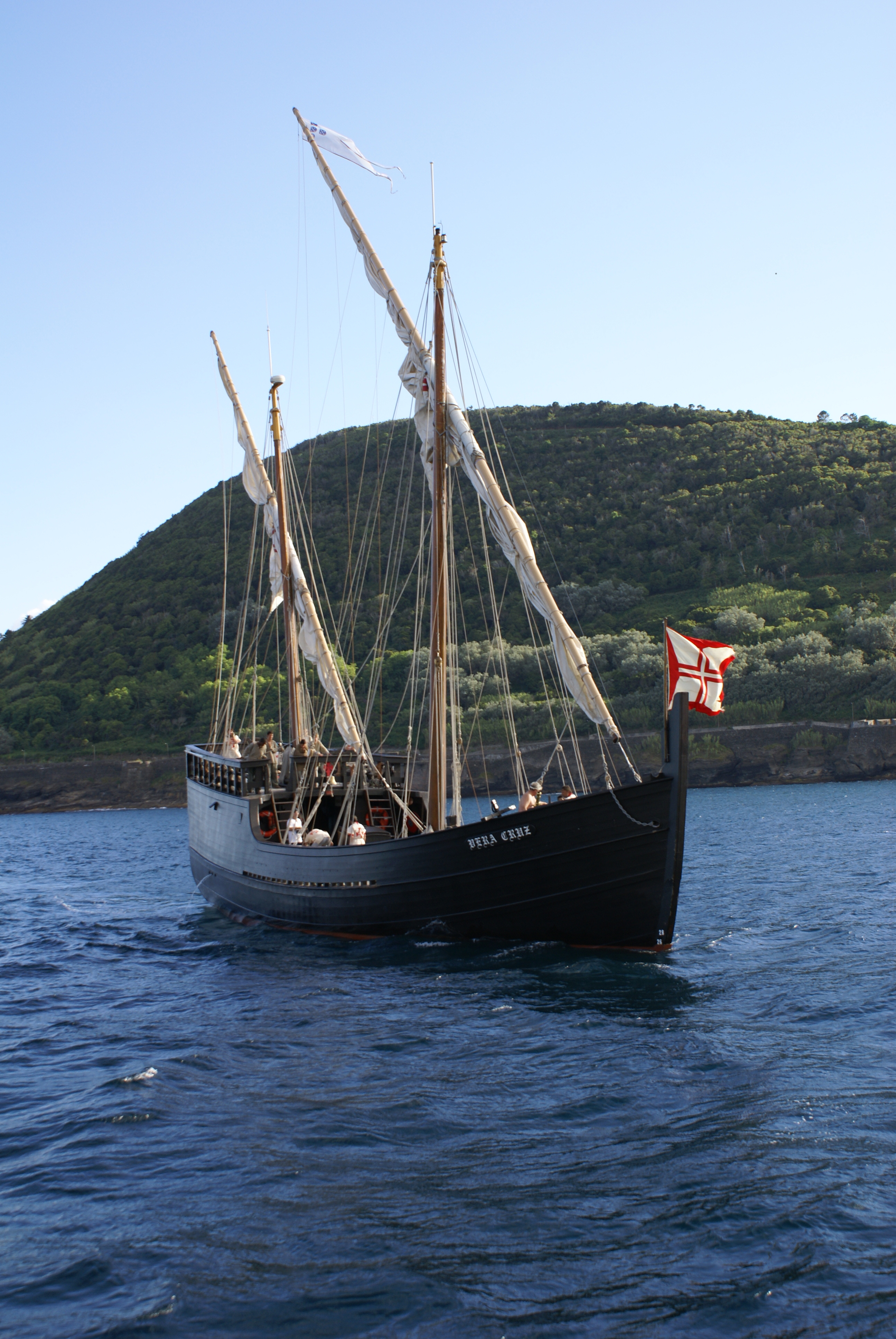
The Vera Cruz entering the bay for the São Joaninas festival: common visitors in the 16th century

Given the immense value of the cargo transiting the Azores and the prevalence of pirates in the north Atlantic, the need to defend the city and the bay of Angra was recognized very early. During a period when trade from the Indies was active, the Portuguese built and maintained a defensive corridor around the island of Terceira, and in particular near the Bay of Angra. This was accomplished by setting up a series of forts, batteries and redoubts to provide a crossfire; the redoubts of Monte Brasil and cannon batteries from the Fort of São Sebastião effectively impeded assaults by pirates and invaders.

The early voyages of Christopher Columbus and, later, those of Vasco da Gama (whose brother, Paulo da Gama, was buried in the Convent of São Francisco in Angra) permitted the Azores to take an important role in mid-Atlantic traffic. Early trading expeditions reinforced the importance of the island of Terceira, and allowed the Bay of Angra to develop as an important trans-shipping stop from the East. This role helped the establishment of a protective fleet, called the "Armada of the Islands" by King Manuel I, and ordered special rules for "...for ships from India in the Azores and the institution of arbiters of customs..." (or maritime magistrates), both in 1520.

During the reign of John III of Portugal, around 1527, the position of the Purveyor of the Fleets was established, with his headquarters in Angra. Pero Anes do Canto was the first Purveyor of the Fleet, and his family occupied this role until the beginning of the nineteenth century. The Purveyor, whose house was strategically close to the Bay of Angra and the customs pier, was responsible for maintaining the security of the island: Pero Anes, therefore, established a surveillance system which could detect approaching raider ships which, in conjunction with coastal defences could protect the ships and their goods, and still provide supplies and provisions. The system required coordination between the Purveyor and other authorities on Terceira, in addition to the islands in the Central and Western Groups of the Azores. Specific attention was taken with the authorities on the island of Corvo (the north-westernmost island in the archipelago), who were likely to spot the arrival of ships from the west: it was the responsibility of the authorities on this island to send a courier to Angra with news of any sighting.

The defence of returning ships was handled by an armed fleet consisting of a variable number of ships that shuttled between Lisbon and Terceira, with regular stops in the archipelago of the Berlengas. On Terceira, the admiralty was constantly monitoring news related to pirates and privateers, normally posting warships near Corvo for intervals of four months. Convoys would form up here, and continue to Lisbon when the last trading ship from the East Indies arrived at the end of the year.

== Geography ==
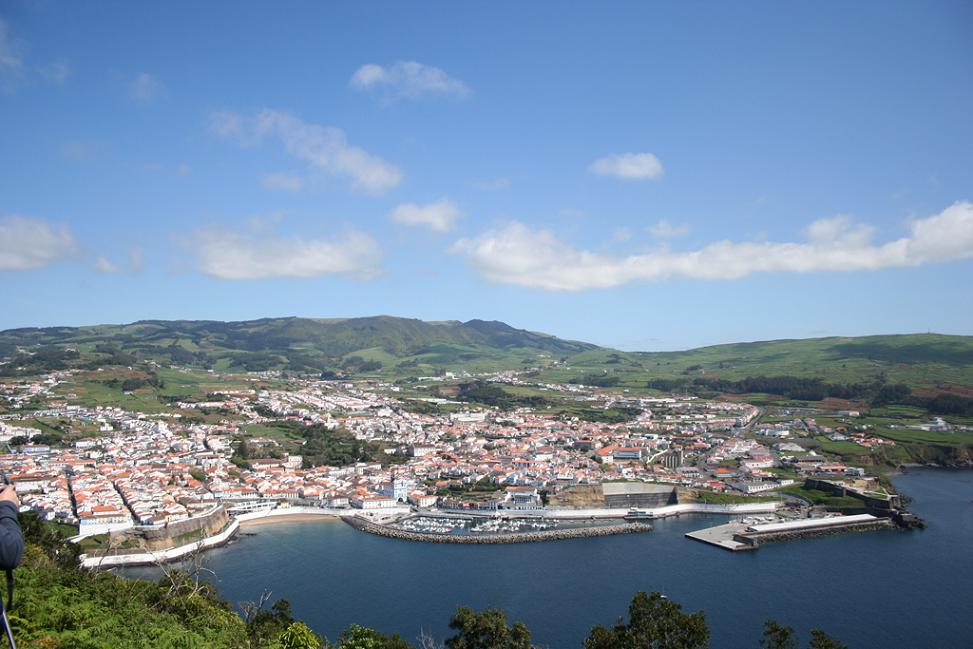
The urban municipality of the city of Angra do Heroísmo

Geological evidence points to the bay being formed by basaltic lavas, much eroded and covered by pyroclastic surges, tuffs of palagonite-like matter, material formed by the interaction of molten basalt and cold seawater, and consolidated volcanic ash ejected from vents during volcanic eruptions, all from the volcano that helped define the bay itself, the looming presence called Monte Brasil. These depositions originated under water and are very solid and compact.

On top of these volcanic layers are sedimentary materials, sometimes of great thickness, formed mainly of sand, pebbles, and large blocks of rolled palagonite with abundant cavities. Consequently, there are many submarine springs that emit brackish water.

This bay, given its origin, has quite a diverse morphology, presenting sandbars, vertical walls (some more than 40 metres high), large blocks, fields of small and medium stones, caves, pebbles scattered on sandy bottoms, etc.

=== Biome ===
Fauna

Some of the marine species present in the bay include:

- Wide-eyed flounder (Bothus podas maderensis)
- Striped red mullet (Mullus surmuletus)
- Guinean pufferfish (Sphoeroides marmoratus)
- Groupers (Serranidae)
- Wrasses (Labridae and Coris julis)
- Black sea urchin (Arbacia lixula)
- Triggerfish (Balistes carolinensis)
- Hermit crab (Calcinus tubularis)
- Octopus (Octopus vulgaris)
- Starfish (Ophidiaster ophidianus)
- Jellyfish (Pelagia noctiluca)
- Portuguese man-o'-war (Physalia physalis)
- Round fantail stingray (Taeniura grabata)
- Blue jack mackerel (Trachurus picturatus)
- Sea anemone (Alicia mirabilis)

Flora

In all, more than 128 species are present in the bay, including:

- Red algae (Asparagopsis armata)
- Red algae (Pterocladiella capillacea)
- Brown algae (Dictyota dichotoma)
- Ascidians-flower (corolla Distaplia)
- Sea lettuce (Ulva intestinalis)
- Sea lettuce (Ulva rigidis)

== Economy ==
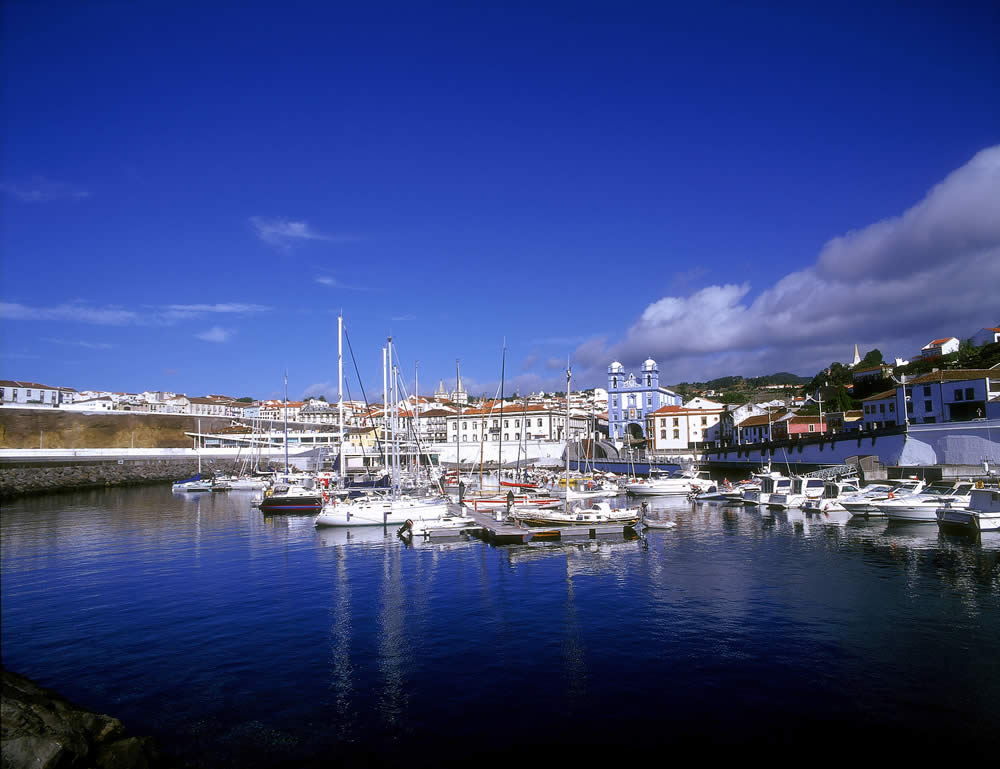
The bay and marina of Angra in the civil parish of Sé

The Direcção Geral dos Portos da Terceira e Graciosa (Directorate-General for the Ports of Terceira and Graciosa), presented on 25 October 2011, in the Centro Cultural e de Congressos (Cultural and Congress Centre) the elaboration of a project of the environmental impact study and process plans for the construction of a new cruiser terminal for the Bay of Angra. The terminal project with a dock of 350–400 metres (1,150–1,310 ft) length, would expand the bay to a 12 metres (39 ft) depth, and provide a 20 metres (66 ft) wide support platform, with 20,000 square metres (220,000 ft^{2}) area, and a ferry ramp for roll-on-roll-off operations for inter-island traffic. During the presentation issues were raised as to manoeuvrability of cruise ships within the confined spaces of the Bay, suggesting that the planned design would not permit ships much latitude to manoeuvre. The design called for a 500 metres (1,600 ft) protective service area, but that a 900 metres (3,000 ft) would be more viable: the mouth of the Monte Brasil channel would have to be expanded in order to support this limited service area.

== Archaeology ==
The following locations are of archaeological interest:

- Cemetery of Anchors (Portuguese: Cemitério das Âncoras)
- Shipwreck of the Lidador, a Brazilian steamboat (1878)
- Shipwreck of the Run'her, a Confederate steamship (1863)
- Underwater Archaeological Park of the Bay of Angra do Heroísmo (Portuguese: Parque Arqueológico Subaquático da Baía de Angra do Heroísmo)

== See also ==
- List of bays in the Azores
