= Monte Brasil =

Mountain in Portugal

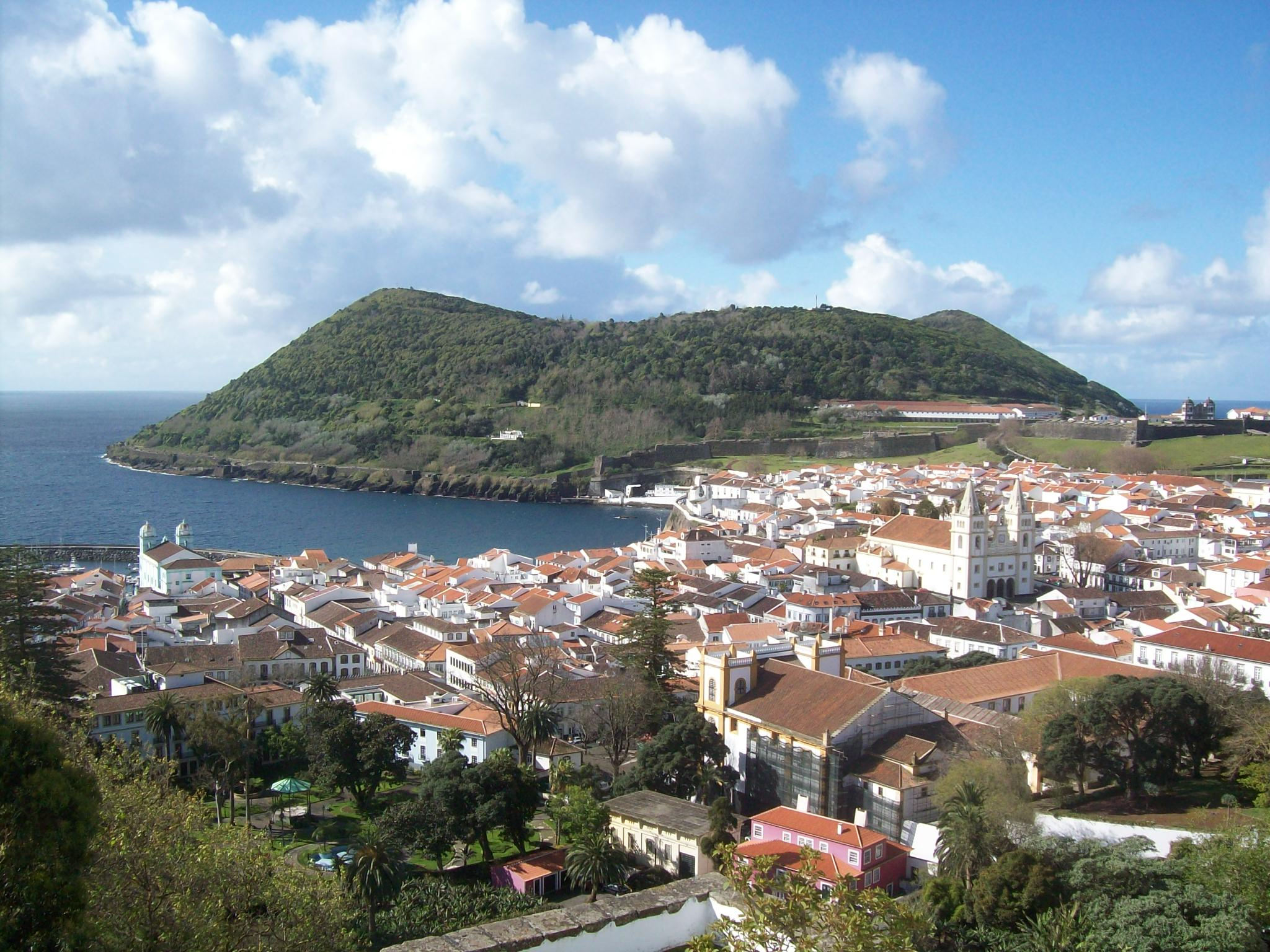
- A view of Monte Brasil and the city of Angra do Heroísmo along the southern coast of Terceira

Highest point
- Elevation: 168 m (551 ft)
- Listing: Mountains of Portugal
- Coordinates: 38°38′42″N 27°13′30″W

Geography
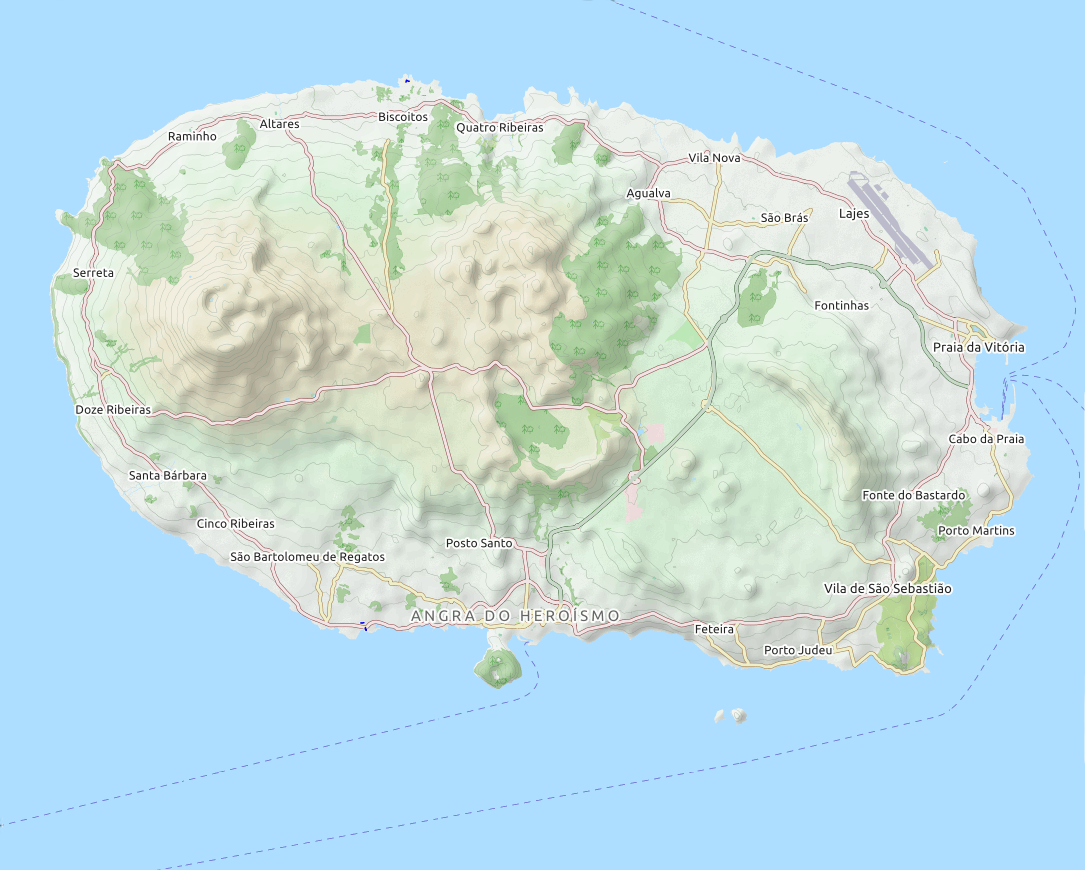
- Location within Terceira
- Location: Angra do Heroísmo, Central Group, Azores, Portugal

Geology
- Rock type: Basalt
- Volcanic arc: Azores Platform

Monte Brasil is the remnants of a tuff volcano (and peninsula) connecting the south coast of Terceira in the central Azores, overlooking the city of Angra do Heroísmo. Monte Brasil is flanked by two bays: the Bay of Angra (named for the city) to its east, and the Bay of Fanal to its west, and was used as a defensive point during the history of Angra, resulting in the construction of various forts and redoubts, including the Fortress of São João Baptista overlooking the city.

== History ==
The formation of Monte Brasil was the result of various eruptions of the Guilherme Moniz volcano, a large central volcano on the island of Terceira, this difficult to identify owing to subsequent eruptions and lava flows. Although this structure is eroded, there is considerable evidence of its influence, including, specifically:

- a number of trachyte domes and basaltic eruptive centres around the interior;
- two Surtseyan cones: Monte Brasil and the Cabras Islets; and
- several ignimbrite deposits, including the Castelinho, that range to 23000 years of age.

An undated human presence on the mount includes artificial cavities located along the hill to provide shelter, but with little vestiges of formal use. Although those on Pico do Zimbreiro are vacant, similar spaces on the roadways to the caldera and Caminho das Belas-donas have bunks along the interior walls. Another grotto on the roadway that skirts the Fort of São Diogo indicates its use as place to collect and store water, including channels, taps and reservoir.

Some specialists have speculated that these cavities have been created by ancient cultures, e.g. Phoenicians. These chambers are not suitable for habitation but could be used as simple structures for Phoenician shrines. Such discovery would testify the presence of ancient cultures in Azores long before Portuguese. There are offered also other explanations, e.g. chambers were created in medieval times for the needs of military or agriculture.

At the end of the 16th century (around 1590), Monte Brasil was occupied by an estate/farm owned by Manuel do Rego da Silveira and several fortifications, including the Forts of São Benedito and Santo António (towards Angra) and the Fort of São Diogo (in the direction of the Bay of Fanal). The existence of reservoir and staircase, in addition to springs already identified in the 16th century cartography, reinforces the importance of Monte Brasil during this time.

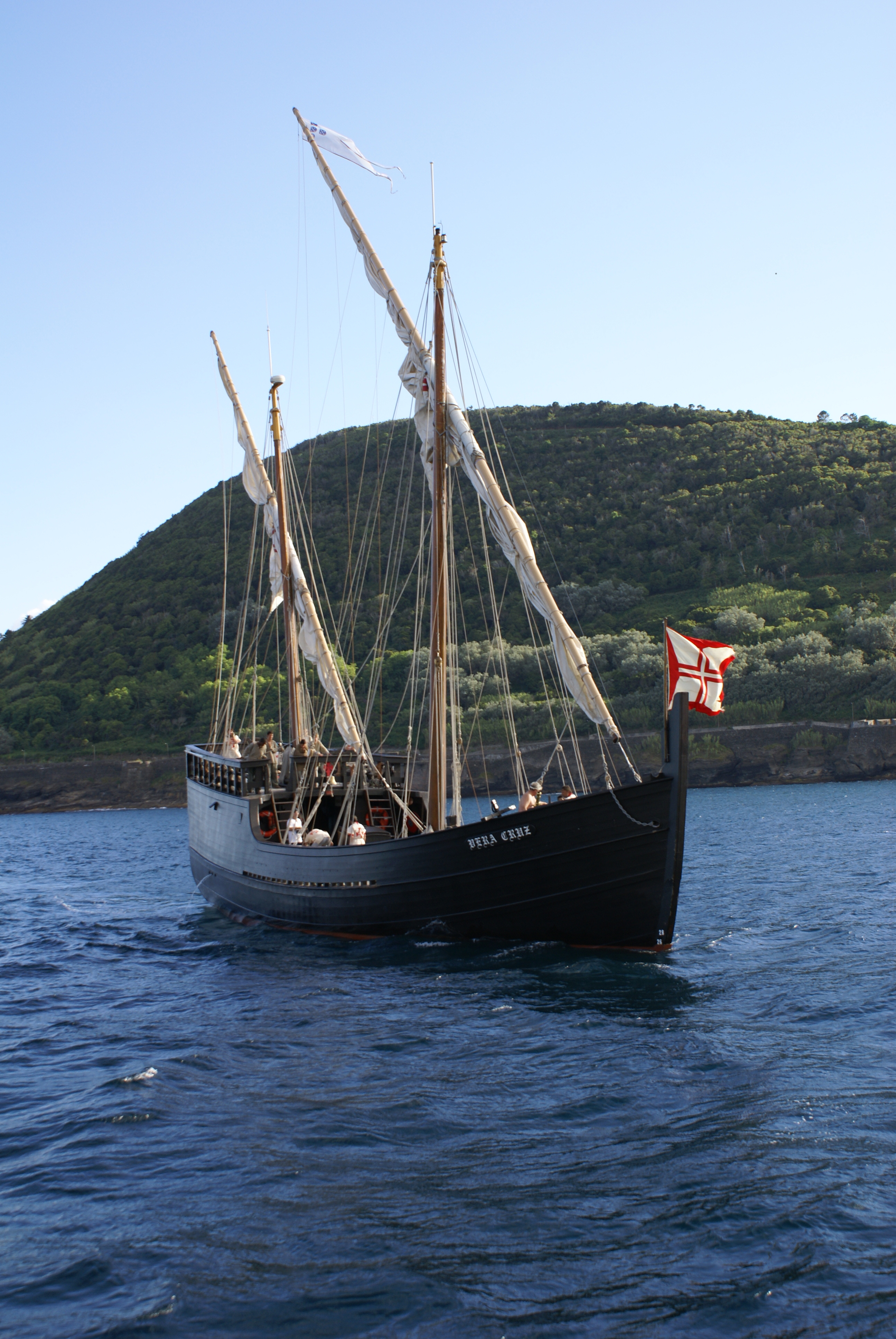
The caravel Vera Cruz enters the Porto de Pipas in Angra Bay: this would have been a common sight during the 15th and 16th centuries

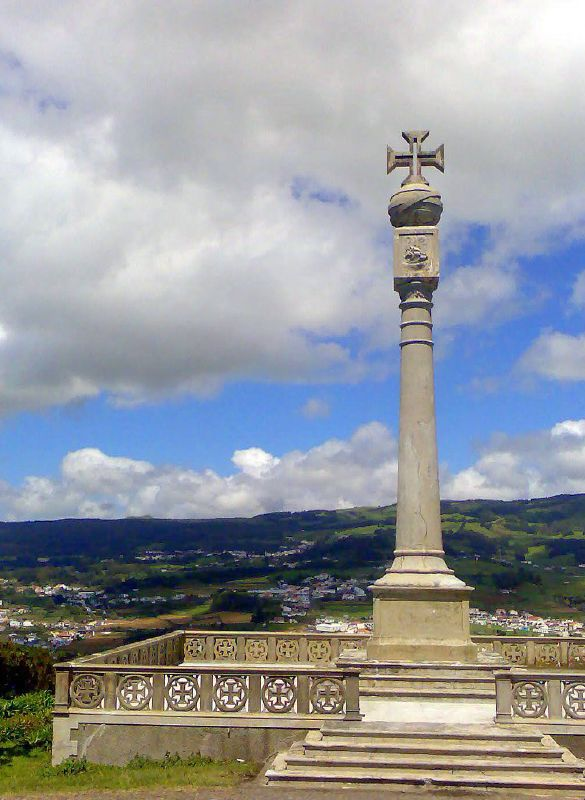
The monument marking Portuguese occupation of the Azores during the Age of Discoveries on Monte Brasil

From this point forward many of the rock deposits (boulders/rock) from the volcano's submarine eruptions were used in the construction of the forts and defences along the coast of the islands. Writing in his epic tome Saudades da Terra, the humanist theologian Gaspar Frutuoso, while describing Angra:

"...what makes it very beautiful, the great high mount called Brasil, as I mentioned, it is all covered in pasture, some farming (which had been covered in trees)...encircled on all four sides, two small two large, this a caldera".

Between the 16th and 17th century, the construction of a system of fortified structures that would be the nucleus of the Fortress of São Filippe/São João Baptista do Monte Brasil. Its main fortification hugs the northern slope of Monte Brasil, but includes 4 kilometres (2.5 mi) of redoubts, emplacements and garrisons around the flanks of the volcano, including the Fort of Zimbreiro, Fort of Santo António, Fort of São Diogo and Fort of Quebrada. Many of the road accesses to Pico do Facho, Pico das Cruzinhas and Pico do Zimbreiro, in addition to the caldera and coastal forts were opened during this period, giving access to most of the peninsula. On Pico do Facho, starting in this period and extending to the 20th century, was a house and semaphore signalling post along with several military structures, including excavations in the ground (channels and rectangular depressions) representing complex installations associated with these activities.

In the 19th century, the area around the Fort of São Diogo was improved and remodelled in order to support the construction of military batteries, during the Liberal Wars.

At the beginning of the Second World War, structures were constructed on the summit of Monte Brasil to support coastal defences of the Azores, during a time when open warfare existed between the Allies and Axis. Buildings to garrison troops and munitions, including several artillery and anti-aircraft emplacements were established to protect the city from assumed submarine/naval attacks on Pico das Cruzinhas and Pico do Facho.

In order safeguard the dynamic ecosystem of the region, the regional government established the Nature Park of Terceira (on 20 April 2011), that included the classification of Monte Brasil for the protection of the marine environment. The [TR20] Área Marinha Protegida de Gestão de Recursos do Monte Brasil (Protected Marine Resource Management Area of Monte Brasil) was established to protect the biodiversity of the fauna and marine habitats that included areas of submerse and semi-submersed grottos that exist along the cliffs.

== Geography ==
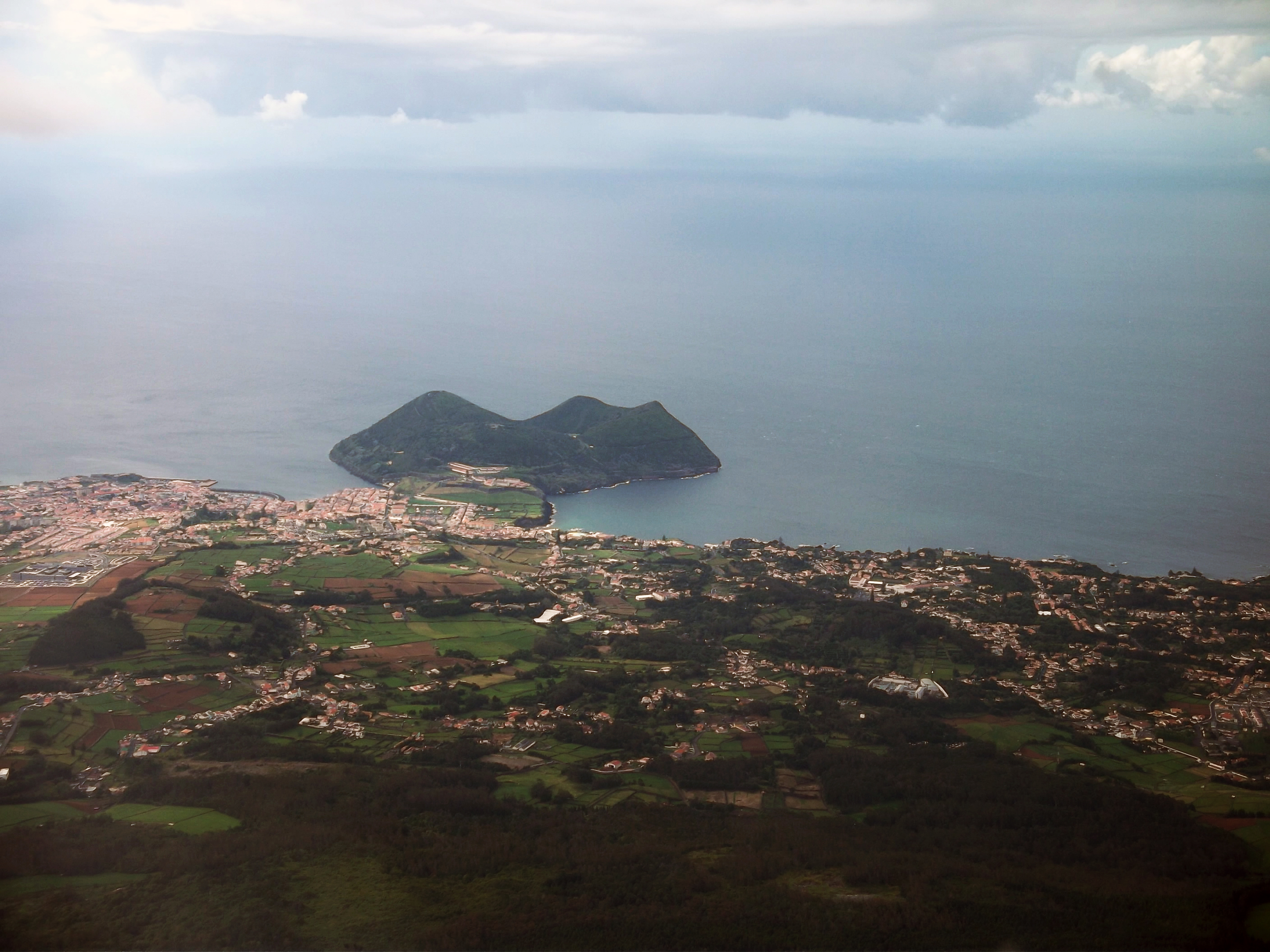
A view of Monte Brasil from the flanks of the Santa Bárbara volcano, showing the built-up urban sprawl of the city of Angra do Heroísmo

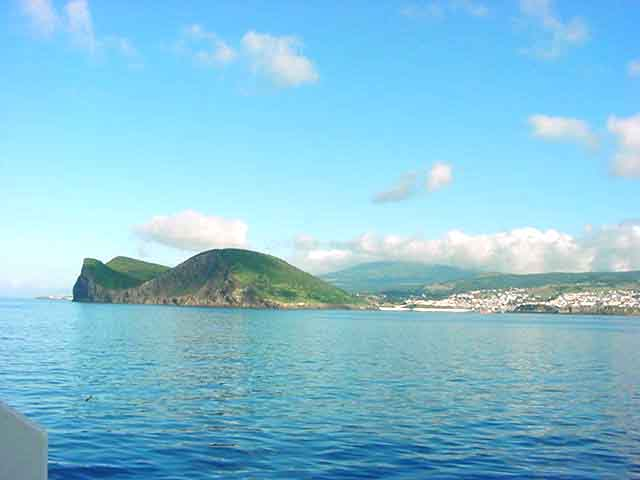
The peninsula and volcanic tuff of Monte Brasil, as seen from the southeast coast

With its imposing point over the city, there are several lookouts situated along its edges that provide panoramic views of the island, including: the Angra marina, the coasts of Porto Judeu and Ribeirinha, the islets in the east, and to the west from the Bay of Fanal, towards Villa Maria until the parish of São Mateus da Calheta. From its summit, on exceptionally clear days it is possible to view São Jorge and Pico, while towards the interior, apart from the various parishes that comprise the city of Angra, there are views of the volcano of Santa Bárbara (the highest point on the island), near the Serra do Morião.

Geologically, Monte Brasil is a 3 kilometres (1.9 mi) wide, tuff cone resulting from a basaltic submarine eruption. The internal structure of this volcano, which is 205 metres (673 ft) in height above sea level (at Pico das Cruzinhas), is marked by layers of basaltic pyroclasts of various thicknesses (between centimetres and metres thick) forming a lithificated palagonite tuff.

=== Biome ===
The island's temperate climate and Monte Brasil's micro-climate allows the growth of a rich vegetation and woody plants, including Azores laurel (Laurus azorica), local heather (Erica azorica), Faya (Myrica faya), African boxwood (Myrsine africana) and the common Azorean juniper (Juniperus brevifolia). The introduction of new species on the island, the resulting deforestation of local areas for shelter and agriculture during settlement, meant that many endemic plants were overrun by exotic species.

Due to great trans-Atlantic distances from the islands few natural mammals species exist on the islands of the Azores. Those animals that live on Monte Brasil, therefore were stowaways on ancient ships from Europe, introduced into the islands for game food or species that were blown out to sea: these include rat (Rattus rattus), least weasels (Mustela nivalis), rabbit (Oryctolagus cuniculus) and the endemic Azorean bat (Nyctalus azoreum).

Of the sedentary bird species the hawk (Buteo buteo rothschild) is the most notable, along with the Atlantic canary (Serinus canaria), common House Sparrow (Passer domesticus), Rock Dove (Columba livia), Atlantic European Goldfinch (Carduelis carduelis parva) and the Azorean subspecies of Common blackbird (Turdus merula azorensis). Migratory and marine birds are more common in the islands of the Azores, resulting in the identification of several species including approximately 37 nesting species on Monte Brasil annually (28 land and eight marine species). During the summer, and especially along the mount's southern coast there are large bands of nesting species of Cory's Shearwater (Calonectris diomedea), Common Tern (Sterna hirundo), and the ubiquitous Caspian Gull (Larus cachinnans).
