= Natural disasters in the Azores =

The following is a list of notable natural disasters that have affected the Azores:

== 15th century ==
- Around 1432: First recorded famine in the Azores.
- 1439–1444 (undocumented): Volcanic eruption on São Miguel at Sete Cidades; details of the eruption were not recorded, not even the exact date of the event. Father Gaspar Frutuoso, who referenced the event in Saudades da Terra, noted that the inhabitants discovered that the topography of the eastern part of the island had changed radically, and that tree trunks and pumice were found floating in the ocean. Colonists from the settlement in what is now Povoação (in the eastern half of the island) heard sounds of explosions and felt many earthquakes leading to this event: "living, these discoverers, in their straw huts, they heard in the space of a year such great grinding, rattling and explosion of the earth with great tremors proceeding the subversion and fire of the peak..."
- 1460?: Another volcanic eruption at Sete Cidades, São Miguel. No specific information was recorded at the time.

== 16th century ==
- 1522: Considered the seminal disaster of the Azores, the 1522 Vila Franca earthquake and landslides occurred on 21–22 October 1522, that inundated and destroyed much of the provincial capital of Vila Franca do Campo, on the island of São Miguel. On the night of 21 and 22 October 1522, another violent earthquake brought down a great mudslide from the hills around Vila Franca do Campo, causing damage to the majority of the town and causing the burial alive of 5000 residents and nobles, with the Donatary-Captain Rui Gonçalves da Câmara escaping the event, owing to his stay in his summer cottage in Lagoa. Later writing, the Bishop of Angra described how the mountains of Rabaçal and Louriçal had fallen and buried 4-5 thousand people. Large mudslides also occurred in Maia, an area near Ponta Garça. The phenomena at Vila Franca inspired many writings, including one that has oral roots, entitled Novel of Vila Franca (Romance de Vila Franca), by Teófilo Braga, and had the effect of inspiring renewed devotion to the religious celebrations of the Holy Spirit.
- 1523-1530: An epidemic plague ravaged the island of São Miguel, and the island became isolated for a few years. The plague also reached Faial Island.
- 1538: A volcanic eruption centered on the cay of Ferraria, São Miguel. In that year, an underwater eruption in the proximity of Ponta da Ferraria lasted for nearly a month. The eruption resulted in the appearance of a small island of "one league in circumference" that shortly disappeared. The eruption caused no damage on land.
- 1547: An earthquake rocked the northeastern part of Terceira Island. It happened on 17 May and damaged Raminho, (Folhadais), Altares, and Biscoitos.
- 1562–1564: A volcanic eruption on Prainha do Norte, Pico Island. On 21 September 1562 tremors lasting for a "third of an hour" shook the land, and were followed by a bang. An interesting contemporaneous description of the eruption still exists; people in the town of Velas on São Jorge Island observed it.
- 1563: Volcanic eruption at Lagoa do Fogo, São Miguel. The eruption began on 29 June, and five violent earthquakes shook the area. There was enormous destruction on the island. The violent eruption ended on 3 July. The activity was a Plinian eruption.
- 1563: A volcanic eruption on São Miguel, almost simultaneous with the eruption on Lagoa do Fogo, caused a strombolian eruption in Pico do Sapateiro parish of Ribeira Seca. The peak was a dome located near the graben of Ribeira Grande where a lagoon used to exist. The volcano spewed large amounts of very fluid basaltic lava. An historian wrote in full detail about the eruption; it is included in the account called Fénix Angrense ("The Phoenix of Angra").
- 1564: Another volcanic eruption on Lagoa do Fogo, São Miguel. The eruption began on 13 February and lasted for a few days, causing no damage.
- 1571: A "seismic crisis" caused great damage in Angra do Heroísmo during the month of June. The earthquake was centered southeast of Terceira Island, probably at Dom João de Castro Bank. It shook Terceira and was felt in São Miguel too. Someone noted that a ship was sailing in the area at the time of the onset of the earthquakes.
- 1580: An eruption of the volcano of Queimada, São Jorge. On the night of 28 April, the land trembled thirty times and fifty times more the next day. On 1 May, there were tremors and an explosion on the top of the volcano. Another explosion happened in front of the upper part of Ribeira do Nabo, two kilometres east of the volcano. The lava flows began near Ribeira do Almeida. The eruption lasted four months, with large lava flows and volcanic ashes spread as far as Terceira.
- 1588: Large floods in São Bento and Porto de Pipas, Terceira on 26 February. The waters flowed through the valley approaching Porto de Pipas, where they caused destruction to ships and boats.
- 1588: Large floods in Velas, São Jorge. On 8 November, the flooding began near Velas with a torrent that "took many people into the sea and flooded many homes". This event was the origin of a popular poem.
- 1591: An earthquake was felt in São Miguel and on Terceira. As a consequence, the earthquake ruined many buildings, especially in Vila Franca do Campo and Água de Pau. The population lost their best homes. The king spent 150,000 reals for reconstruction. On Terceira, the land shook four times and seemed to want to "subvert itself".
- 1593: The worst agricultural year in memory caused a famine in the islands of Terceira and São Jorge, which was associated with the war of 1580–1593.
- 1599–1600: Bubonic plague caused seven thousand deaths on Terceira. The year 1599 was known as the "bad year" because of the epidemic crisis. It affected much of the population, and, for two years, it was the worst disaster in Terceira's history. Plague revisited, off and on, for nearly two decades.

== 17th century ==
- 1606 — Flooding in Velas, São Jorge, in February caused much damage to the town of Velas, many roads were "the way that no one could walk a foot".
- 1608 — Large flooding in Angra, Terceira - On 11 February at about 9 at night, and created a huge intense mudslide in Angra, situated during the area all night. At dawn, the mudslide intensified causing excavation of a cave named Santa Luzia. The waters flooded Rua Miragaia as well as Rus do Marquês and Rua do Palácio and also flooded Rua Direita. The flood knocked down walls at the town's harbour (the famous "Porta do Mar") and damaged or destroyed various homes and other buildings.
- 1613 — Year of the sterility of the grass. It killed two cows. That year was a combination of drought and gale-force winds in the winter and spring leaving in one dramatic situation. It killed many animals. It would have been the year of La Niña?
- 1614 — The first "Caída da Praia" ("Falling of Praia"): earthquakes on 9 April in Fontinhas and 24 May in Praia, Terceira. On 9 April, an earthquake destroyed almost all of the parish of Fontinhas and severely damaged other parishes. On 24 May, an earthquake with a huge magnitude ruined almost all of the parishes of Agualva, Vila Nova, Lajes and Santa Cruz de Praia caused injuries. Francisco Ferreira Drummond described in the Annals of Terceira "Fallen" in the reconstruction with a great detail.
- 1630 — A Plinian-type Eruption of Furnas, São Miguel and occurred on 3 September. It was known as the "Year of the Ashtray", 191 people were killed in the eruption. The eruption was accompanied with a volcanic explosions in sea and the stone located near Lagoa do Fogo and around Ribeira Quente. It also created large mudslides in lands of the south coast of the island of São Miguel.
- 1630 — Mudslide in Castelo, São Miguel, in 1630 a gigantic mudslide happened where today lies the westernmost point of the "cape" located near Ribeira Quente, São Miguel. The mudslide tore a part of Castelo in the area now known as Ponta da Albufeira. The mudslide was associated with an eruption on Furnas in the same year.
- 1637 — A hurricane reached Terceira. On 2 August a major storm pounded the island and caused much damage.
- 1638 — An underwater eruption occurred near Candelária, São Miguel island. The Surtseyan-type eruption began on 3 July, about 2 km off the Ponta da Candelária. For 29 days it produced a ring-shaped island. During the eruption, sulfur in the sea in a radius of about eight leagues in distance killed many fish which created "To load eight vessels to India".
- 1641 — On 21 December a tsunami (probably the result of a marine earthquake) caused great destruction in the town of Velas, São Jorge.
- 1647 — Seismic crisis in Terceira and caused the worst agricultural year in all of the islands. It lasted from the end of December up until the beginning of July causing violent tremors causing panic in Angra.
- 1649 — A storm wrecked four boats in Angra, earthquake in Terceira, a storm caused strong southeast winds to overturn four boats in Angra. A small earthquake shook Terceira. It was the year that celebrated good wine productions.
- 1652 — Eruption on Pico do Fogo, São Miguel, after one week of violent eruption, which caused great phenomena in Lagoa and parts of Ponta Delgada. An outflow of basaltic lava resulting from a Strombolian eruption on 19 October destroyed areas near Calhetas as well as parts of Portões Vermelhos. The eruption lasted for 15 days.
- 1656 — An earthquake and several aftershocks hit the island of São Miguel at two o'clock on the afternoon of 18 October 1656, and a strong aftershock at seven in the evening of the following day damaged houses.
- 1656 — Epidemic of smallpox in Terceira - The epidemic affected almost all children under the age of three and reached the population as high as the age of fifteen.
- 1668 — A storm reached and devastated Calheta on São Jorge - On 23 November a violent storm caused an "alteration of the sea that flooded the village destroying and knocking down houses", it also obstructed the port.
- 1672 — A volcanic eruption occurred on the night of 13 April in Faial which was followed by five seismic waves causing a seismic crisis in the whole island. Victims of the volcano emigrated to Maranhão, Brazil.
- 1678 — Lack of cereals caused disputes in the municipalities in the islands of São Jorge and Pico. A worst agricultural year which made cereals scarce for the islands of São Jorge and Pico and made it necessary to prohibit cereal exports
- 1682 — Underwater eruption occurred in front of Ferraria, São Miguel, the eruption was four leagues from Ponta da Ferraria.
- 1690 — A huge storm along with an earthquake caused panic on the island of Terceira.
- 1698 — Seismic crisis in Terceira in October created panic in the population.

== 18th century ==
- 1713 — Floods in the town of Velas on São Jorge. On 10 December in the same year, many intense mudslides in the area between Urzelina and Rosais caused large floods which destroyed 27 houses in the town of Velas. The Ribeira da Almeida overflowed by its beach which allowed the passage by foot between the town and Queimage
- 1713 — Volcanic eruption and gases at Pico das Camarinhas on São Miguel Island. In various weeks continued and in late December, created fumes and gases throughout the area. The eruption created volcanic explosions. The seismic crisis destroyed many houses in Ginetes, Mosteiros and Candelária.
- 1717–1718 — Epidemic in Faial which lasted from November 1717 to February 1718 which caused a bubonic plague. In November, the death toll were mainly in Cedros, the same in Castelo Branco and Flamengos.
- 1718 — Eruption in Santa Luzia do Pico which started on 1 February and ended on 15 August, with resumed activity in September which ended at the beginning of November. The localization was in the eruptive centre.
- 1720 — Eruption in Soldão, Lajes do Pico on 10 July.
- 1720 — Eruption in Banco D. João de Castro.
- 1730 — Earthquake caused destruction to parish of Luz in Graciosa. On 13 June a violent earthquake destroyed the whole parish of Luz in Graciosa.
- 1744 — A tropical cyclone struck the island of Picl, ruining the parishes of Praina do Galeão, Praia do Norte and São Roque and also in Água de Pau.
- 1755 — A tsunami reached the Azores following the 1755 Lisbon earthquake. It ruined a large number of buildings in number of parishes. Almost all of its ports in the Azores suffered great destruction and many boats were lost. The wave reached about 10 palms (about 150 m) and up to 80 palms (about 120 m).
- 1757 - Earthquake in São Jorge, 9 July 1757. Located nearest to Calheta and Ribeira Seca. More than 1000 people throughout the island died.
- 1759–1760 — An earthquake in Faial, which began on 24 December 1759, was the greatest earthquake in the island's history and followed by many tremors. Another quake occurred on 4 January.
- 1761 — Eruption on Pico Gordo, Terceira which started in November 1760 and created violent tremors which continued until 14 April. Another eruption happened on 21 April in the same year.
- 1761 — A tropical hurricane affected the central group of the Azores Islands on 29 September.
- 1779 — A tropical storm, on the night of 30–31 October, once again caused destruction in the central group of the islands.
- 1779 — Epidemic in Flores.
- 1787 — In March a seismic crisis in Graciosa shook the island and caused considerable damage.
- 1800 — An earthquake in the northeastern portion of Terceira, in the afternoon of 24 June, destroyed a good part of the buildings of the parishes and villages of northeastern Terceira.

== 19th century ==
- 1801 — Earthquake in São Sebastião, the sequence of the earthquake in the previous year, new earthquake with larger intensity reached the same parishes. Damage was mainly to São Sebastião, a beach settlement near Cabo da Praia.
- 1808 — Eruption in Urzelina, São Jorge
- 1811 — A volcanic eruption occurred at the shore of Ferraria, São Miguel creating the short-lived Sabrina Island named after the British frigate HMS Sabrina, whose captain, Commander James Tillard, first identified the island and claimed it for the United Kingdom. The eruption caused destruction to many homes. The islet itself disappeared in the following years.
- 1817 — Seismic crisis in the island of Graciosa causing much damage to most buildings and properties.
- 1841 — A second "Caída da Praia" ("Falling of Praia") earthquakes on 15 June in Praia da Vitória and Fontinhas on Terceira - Houses were destroyed in the parishes of Santa Cruz da Praia, Fontinhas, Lajes, São Brás, Vila Nova, Agualva, Cabo da Praia, Porto Martins and São Sebastião.
- 1848 — An earthquake caused nine deaths in southwestern São Miguel island, the strength caused much damage to Várzea, Feteiras, Candelária and Ginetes.
- 1852 — An earthquake rumble the island of São Miguel causing damage to the area.
- 1857 — Hunger reached São Jorge. A tropical cyclone reached the Central Group on 24 August 1857 and caused the destruction of about two thousand farmlands and a consequent famine which lasted until after 1859.
- 1867 — Underwater eruptions in the cay of Serreta, Terceira on the night of 1 June and on 7 June, followed by many weeks of intense aftershocks.
- 1893 — On 28 August an unnamed hurricane (or summer storm) influenced the southern coast of Terceira island causing destruction, including permanent damage to the old Church of São Mateus da Calheta. The resulting storm resulted in the abandon of the temple and, eventually its reconstruction into the interior, along with much of the settlement.

== 20th century ==
- 1907 — An underwater eruption at the Mónaco Fracture. On 1 April founded a small eruption at a radius of 400 m at the depths of Banco Mónaco SSW of S. Miguel. It spewed out ashes from the submerged cape São Miguel - Faial.
- 1911 — Underwater eruption in the Mónaco Fracture, in March, it caused a minor eruption located about 200 to 300 m in depth SSW in 1907, the eruption lasted several hours.
- 1926 — A major earthquake shook the city of Horta. In early April, the island saw the first of a series of intensive earthquakes. On 5 April damage was reported in Flamengos, Ribeirinha, and Conceição. An earthquake on 31 August at 8.42 local time (10.42 GMT) caused eight deaths and further destruction in the towns of Horta and the parishes of Conceição, Praia do Almoxarife (ruining 220 homes), Flamengos, Feteira and Castelo Branco and most of Lomba do Pilar e o Salão. 4,138 homes and buildings were damaged or destroyed.
- 1957–1958 — An eruption at Capelinhos, Faial, between 16 and 27 September 16, 1957, finally ending on 25 October 1958, ruined buildings and extended the land by an underwater eruption 1 km from Ponta dos Capelinhos. Many people emigrated to North America.
- 1963 — An earthquake and an underwater eruption affected Santa Luzia in Pico between 12 and 15 December. It made seismographs from Faial registered a volcanic tremor at Cachorro, Santa Luzia on the north coast of the island of Pico. The tremor lasted from 13 to 14 December. On 15 December 15, with clear weather and good visibility, residents of Faial and Pico saw "balls of clouds of vapor" leaving from the front of Cachorro. None of these materials were collected and the phenomenon was not did not shook heavily and did not cause any damage.
- 1964 — An earthquake shook the island of São Jorge in the area of Rosais and Velas, damaging 900 homes and 400 buildings, as well as causing panic on the island, leading to the evacuation of large numbers of Jorgenses to the island of Terceira and other islands. The crisis was caused by an underwater deep eruption off the coast of Rosais.
- 1973 — An earthquake shook the islands of Pico and Faial. On 11 October residents felt numerous aftershocks on Pico, Faial, and São Jorge, particularly affecting the parish of São Mateus and the locality of Terra do Pão and Pico island. On 23 November at 12.36 local time (14.30 GMT) a violent earthquake (measured at 7/8 on the Wood-Neumann scale), with its epicenter near Santo Antonio on Pico, caused major damage, with many houses damaged, fallen walls and displaced streets and roads, in the parishes of Bandeiras Santa Luzia, Santo António, and São Roque on the north coast of Pico and São Mateus on the south coast and further destruction in the parishes of Conceição, Matriz, and Flamengos on the island of Faial.
- 1980 — The 1 January earthquake devastated Terceira, São Jorge and Graciosa islands, occurring at 16.42 local time (18.42 GMT) and measuring 7 on the Richter Scale. The epicenter was located nearly 35 km SSW of Angra do Heroísmo. It caused damage to buildings in the city of Angra do Heroísmo. town of São Sebastião and the parishes of west and north-west Terceira and including Topo and Santo Antão, in São Jorge devastated Carapacho and Luz in Graciosa. The earthquake was one of the greatest recorded earthquakes in the Azores Islands. 71 people lost their lives, 400 were injured, nearly 15,500 homes were destroyed and 15,000 (about 5% of the Azorians) were homeless.
- 1981 — An underwater eruption in Fractura Mónaco. At the beginning of July, a small underwater eruption about 300 m in depth was located in Banco Mónaco (SSW of São Miguel), it spewed gases and basaltic materials.
- 1997 — An underwater eruption near Banco D. João de Castro -In the spring of 1997, the intense microseismic activity rumbled throughout that area and caused numerous earthquakes and aftershocks (I to III on the Mercali scale felt in Terceira and São Miguel islands lifted and created an underwater eruption.
- 1997 — Mudslide in Ribeira Quente, São Miguel, on 31 October 1997. Nearly two hours of heavy rainfall on 31 October led to the creation of a mudslide over the hillsides of Outeiro das Freiras which left 114 persons from 36 families homeless.
- 1998 — The 1998 Azores Islands earthquake on 9 July shook Faial, Pico and São Jorge at 5.19 GMT. Measuring 5.6 on the Richter scale with an epicenter NNE of the island of Faial, it caused damage to the parishes of Riberinha, Pedro Miguel, Salão and Cedros and more damage in Castelo Branco (mainly Lombega), Flamengos and Praia do Almoxarife on Faial. It also caused damage in parts of Pico Island and the far western part of the São Jorge Island. Eight people lost their lives in the earthquake; 1,700 were made homeless.
- 1999–2000 — An underwater eruption shook Serreta on Terceira registering aftershocks in the area on 25 November 1998. Fishermen reported another eruption at the end of December.

== 21st century ==
- Spring 2005 — Heavy rainfall deluged the Azores, causing mudslides and flooding throughout the islands. People were stranded in their houses and roads were closed; buildings, property, and some roads were damaged.
- 2005 — Seismic crisis in Fogo-Congro-Monte Escuro. Over 40.000 earthquakes recorded by CIVISA and 100 felt in São Miguel Island. Earthquakes occurred on 20 September (M_{L} 4.1) and 21 September (M_{L} 4.0), causing concern in the island population. None or few buildings damaged during the swarms, but several landslides on Fogo volcano flanks.
- 15 December 2009 — Heavy rainfall deluged the Azores, causing flooding throughout the islands; in the parish of Agualva, in the municipality of Praia da Vitória, flooding resulted in landslides, destruction of homes and automobiles, where the waters escaped the ravines. Oone person died, and dozens of inhabitants were affected by the events.
- 3 December 2010 — The bad weather in the Azores during this period resulted in a "great sliding of land" on the island of Flores, which resulted in the obstruction of the road access to Fajãnzinha, impeding vehicles in this locality. Reports from the Serviço Regional de Protecção Civil (Regional Service for Civil Protection) indicated that there was no material damage or harm to people in the area (although some seniors were removed from the area for their safety). Meanwhile, trees fell on the island of São Miguel, and two were injured as their car left the road during the storm. On Santa Maria, the bad weather resulted in the flooding of homes.
- 14 March 2013 — Flooding in the civil parish of Porto Judeu, when the community's principal ravine overflowed its banks, invading the centre of the parish; 20 inhabitants were affected and 30 became homeless. A similar landslide caused by torrential rainfall in Faial da Terra on the island of São Miguel caused three deaths and damage to various homes.
- 11 January 2021 — A 5.4 magnitude earthquake hit the western Azores.

== See also ==
- List of Azores hurricanes
