= Nossa Senhora dos Remédios (Povoação) =

- Civil parish
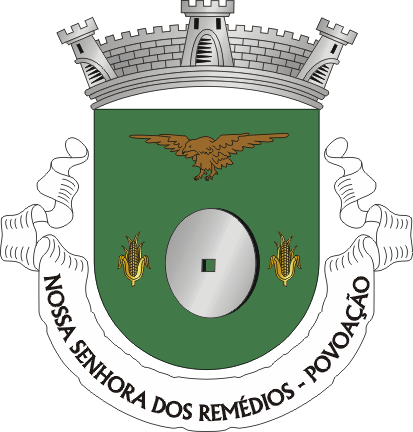
- Coat of arms

- Location of the civil parish seat of Nossa Senhora dos Remédios in the municipality of Povoação
- Coordinates: 37°46′21″N 25°13′23″W
- Country: Portugal
- Auton. region: Azores
- Island: São Miguel
- Municipality: Povoação

Area
  - Total: 12.78 km^{2} (4.93 sq mi)
- Elevation: 227 m (745 ft)

Population (2011)
  - Total: 1,112
  - Density: 87.01/km^{2} (225.4/sq mi)
- Time zone: UTC−01:00 (AZOT)
  - Summer (DST): UTC+00:00 (AZOST)
- Postal code: 9650-248
- Area code: 292
- Patron: Nossa Senhora dos Remédios

Nossa Senhora dos Remédios (Portuguese, 'Our Lady of Remedies') is a parish in the municipality of Povoação in the Azores. The population in 2011 was 1,112, in an area of 12.78 km².
