= Povoação, Azores =

Povoação
- Municipality
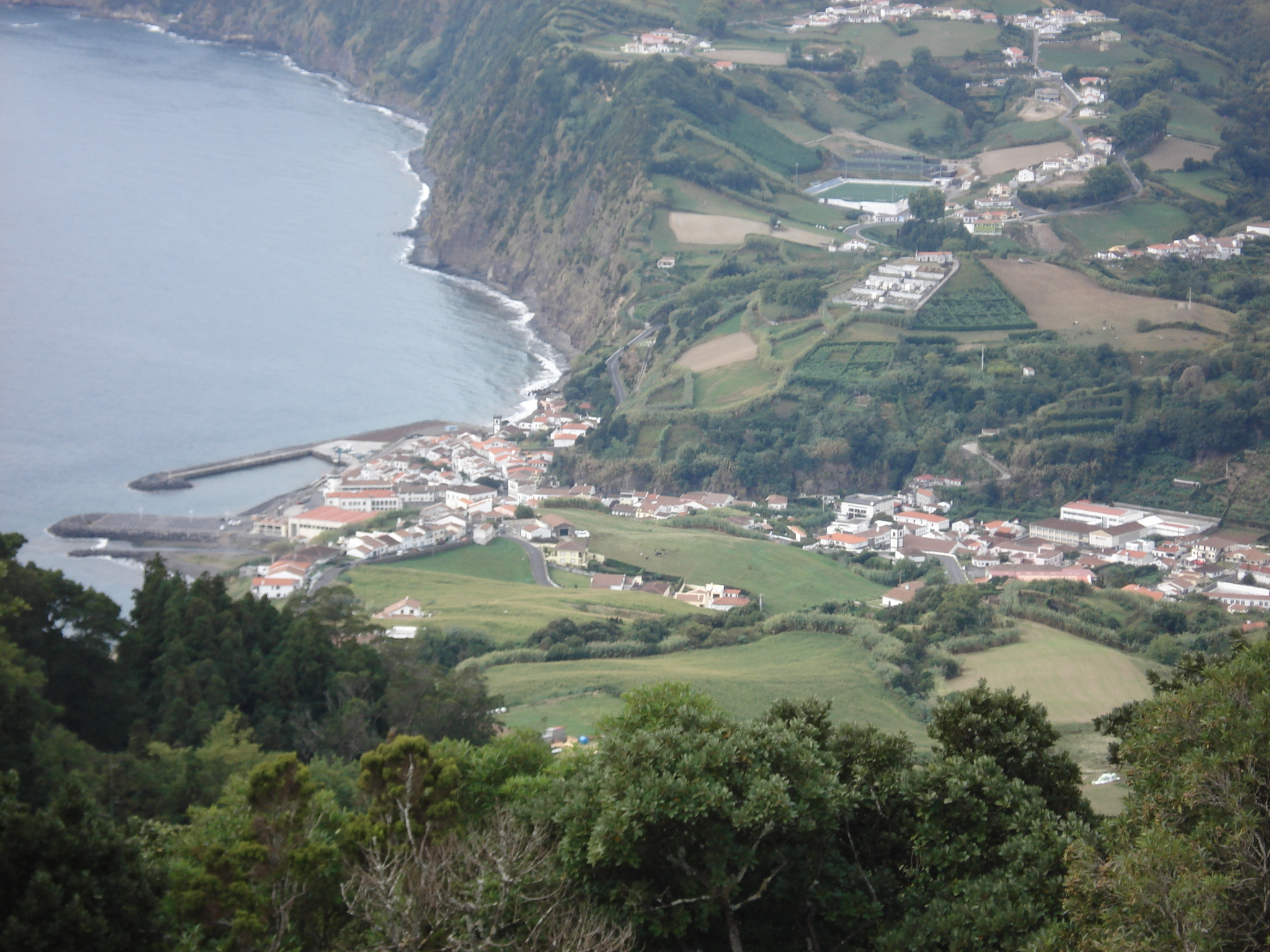
- The municipal seat of the municipality of Povoação located along the lombas of the Povoação crater

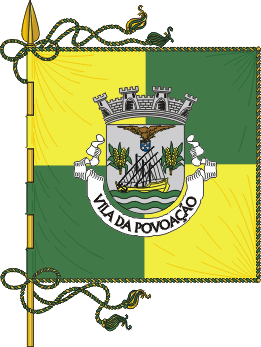
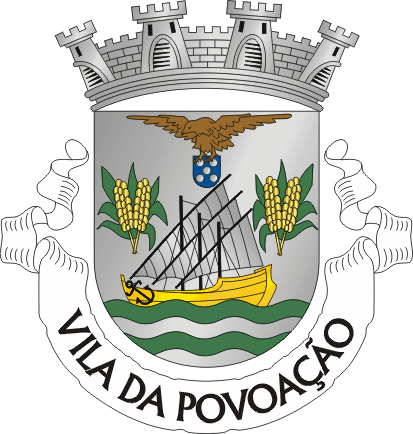
- Flag Coat of arms
- Interactive map of Povoação
- Coordinates: 37°46′43″N 25°16′45″W
- Country: Portugal
- Auton. region: Azores
- Island: São Miguel
- Established: Settlement: c. 1472; Municipality: c. 1839
- Parishes: 6

Government
  - President: Pedro Nuno Melo

Area
  - Total: 106.41 km^{2} (41.09 sq mi)
- Elevation: 580 m (1,900 ft)

Population (2011)
  - Total: 6,327
  - Density: 59.46/km^{2} (154.0/sq mi)
- Time zone: UTC−01:00 (AZOT)
  - Summer (DST): UTC+00:00 (AZOST)
- Postal code: 9650-411
- Area code: (+351) 296 XX XX XX
- Patron: Nossa Senhora da Mãe de Deus
- Local holiday: 3 July; the day after Corpus Christi
- Website: http://www.cm-povoacao.pt

Povoação (Portuguese pronunciation: [puvu.ɐˈsɐ̃w]) is a municipality located in the southeastern corner of the island of São Miguel in the Portuguese archipelago of the Azores. The population in 2011 was 6,327, in an area of 106.41 km^{2}.

== History ==
Colonization of the island is commonly associated with the settlement of Povoação Velha, the first colony on the island of São Miguel. In 1427, Diogo da Silva first arrived in the area of Povoação, accompanied by several men: "Arriving here on the island, the nine discoverers took land in the place where today we call Povoação Velha for which they made later...and, disembarked between two fresh ravines of clear, sweet and cold waters, (the Ribeira de Além and the Ribeira de Pelames) between the cliffs and high lands, (Morro de Santa Bárbara and Lomba dos Pós) all covered in greenery of cedro, laurel, ginger and faias, and other diverse". From the beginning, the locality impressed the settlers, since it was abundant in vegetation, to them indicating a fertile land.

In 1432, Gonçalo Velho Cabral, then first Captain-Donatário of São Miguel, chose the locality for the first settlement on the island. From this location they began to transport cattle, wheat seed, legumes and agricultural implements in order to make the settlement viable. On 2 July 1439, a royal decree from Infante D. Pedro, regent to King Afonso V, ordered Infante Henry to send sheep to the seven islands of the Azores (until that time Corvo and Flores had not been discovered).

During the 18th century, the region became a center of naval construction, owing to the abundance of wood in the immediate area.

The community of Povoação was elevated to the status of municipality in 1839, when it was de-annexed from the municipality of Vila Franca do Campo and later, Nordeste. The parish church, dedicated to Nossa Senhora da Mãe de Deus (Our Lady The Mother of God), was constructed from 24 July 1848, and is emblematic for its gilded wood altarpiece and the image of its patron. On 4 July 1865, the parish council building was first inaugurated, later to be the site of the municipalities local government.

The municipality, and in particular the town of Povoação, was damaged during the 1935 earthquake. Construction on the municipal garden began in the 1940s, during the execution of the reconstruction program for the urban nucleus.

== Geography ==
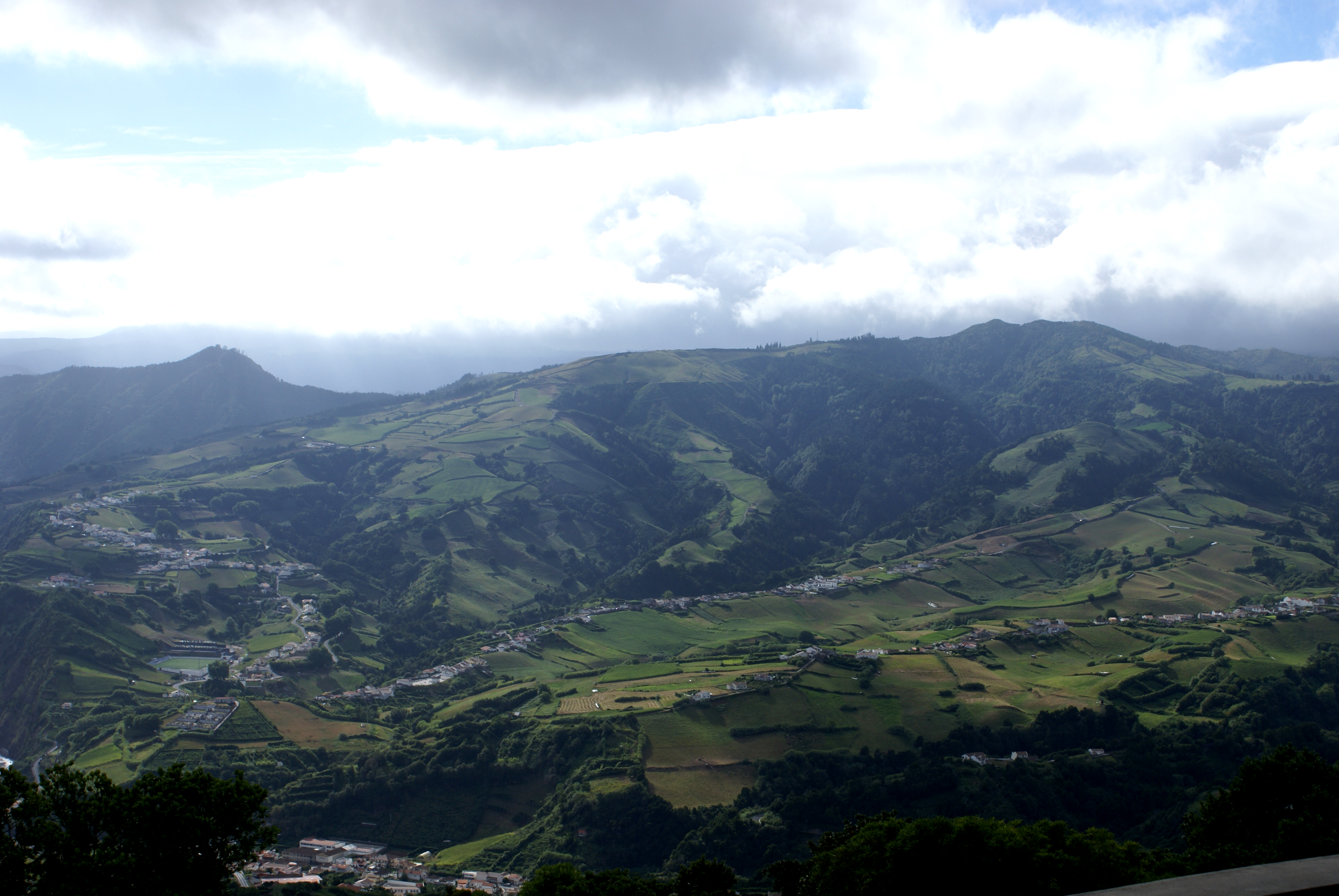
The Povoação crater, physical location of the main parishes of Povoação and Nossa Senhora dos Remedios

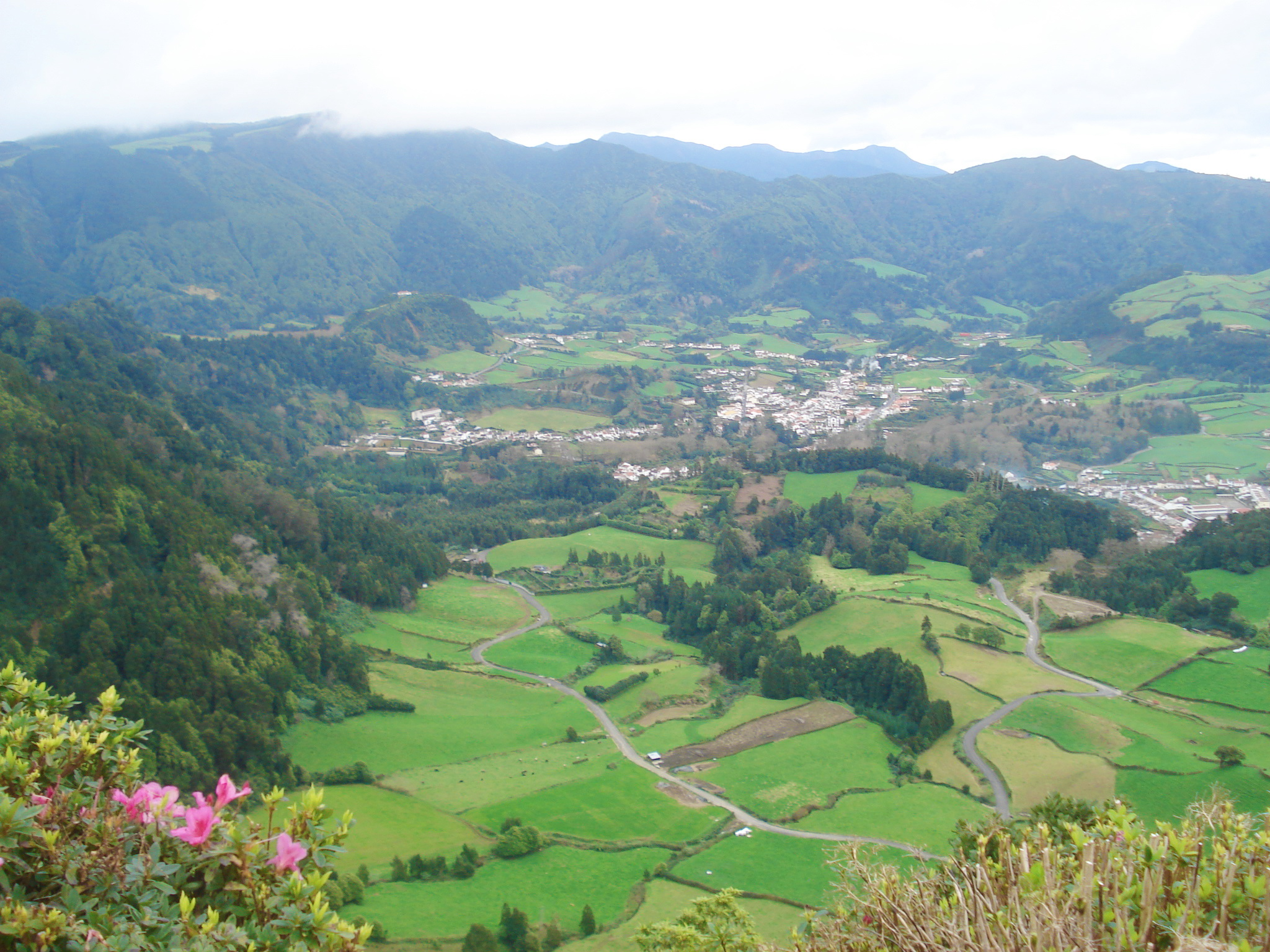
The geological active region of the Furnas valley and the civil parish of the same name

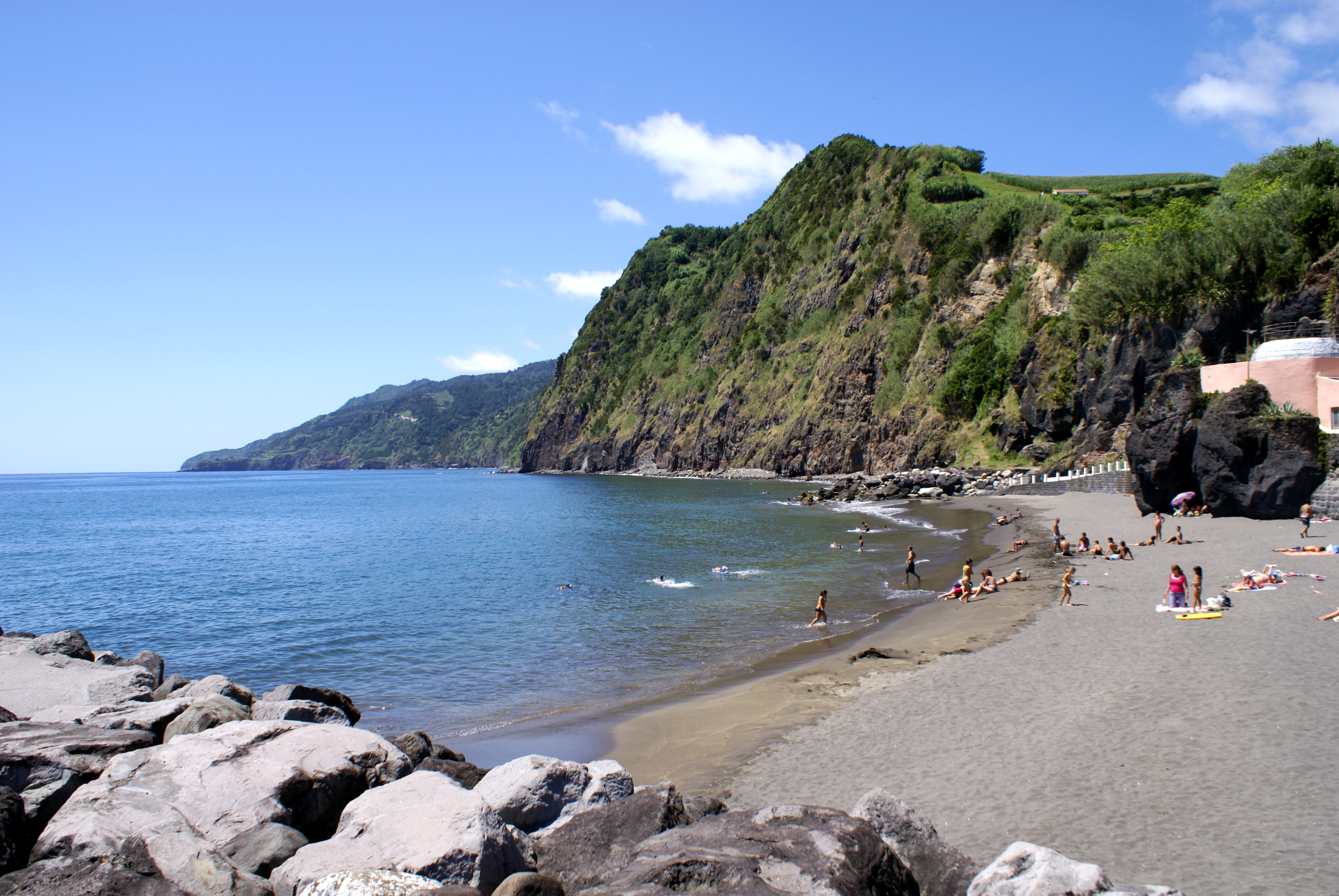
One of the few sand beaches (Praia da Povoação) along the coast of the town of Povoação

With an area of 110.30 square kilometres (42.59 mi^{2}), Povoação is located 60 kilometres (37 mi) east of the regional capital of Ponta Delgada and former historical capital, Vila Franca do Campo, along the southern extent of the Estrada Regional E.R. 1-1ª that circles the entire island. It is bordered on the east and northeast by the municipality of Nordeste, to the north by Ribeira Grande, and west by Vila Franca do Campo.

=== Physical geography ===
The municipality occupies the semi-active craters of the Furnas and Povoação volcanoes, circled by forests, mountains and river valleys to the north, west and east, while the Atlantic coast to the south. From 100,000 to 95,000 years ago, the Povoação crater, associated with the volcano, consists of volcanic products that were emitted from this volcano of the same name, that overlay the Volcanic Complex of Nordeste. Corresponding basaltic lava flows and other volcanic ejectants, the top of this formation is covered by materials involved in explosive eruptions from the Furnas volcano.

With about 100000-year history, the Furnas volcano is the youngest of the active volcanoes of São Miguel. The rock and mineral deposits are divided into three groups, consisting essentially of trachyte materials, constituted by pyroclastic deposits and flows resulting from explosive eruptions, lava flows and surges. The inferior layer includes most pyroclastic materials and volcanic products in the formation of the Povoação Ignimbrite (some 30000 years ago). The intermediate layer includes material produced between 30,000 years and 5,000 years ago (reaching the Fogo A deposits). Finally, the superior layer includes all activities until 5000 years ago.

Much of the remainder of the land is occupied by agricultural lands, specifically on the fertile plains over the river valleys. These geological structures resulted in a diversified landscape, dotted by parks, lookouts, belvederes, beaches and salient waters, including the Lagoa das Furnas (Lake Furnas) a volcanic crater lake and the manicured gardens of the Terra Nostra Garden (Portuguese: Parque Terra Nostra). The Furnas valley is a source of important horological resources, resulting from the active volcanism of the region, with fumaroles, boiling mud, thermal baths and at least one recognized tepid beach (Ribeira Quente). This valley includes 22 classified mineral-rich medicinal waters (the largest center of its kind).

=== Human geography ===
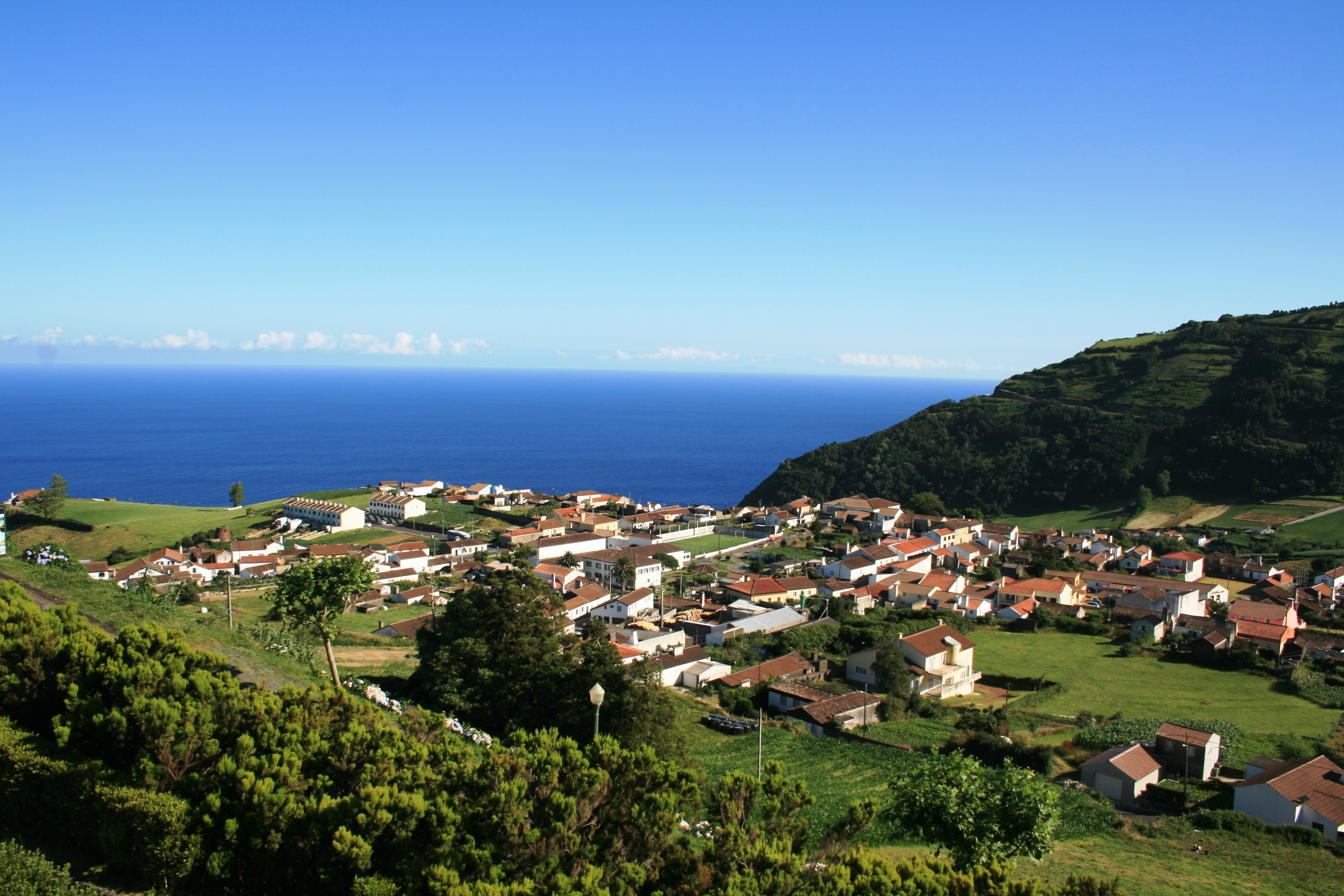
The agricultural centre of Água Retorta, located near the border with Nordeste

With a population of 7000 inhabitants, the municipality consists of six civil parishes (that administrate local authority), which include:

- Água Retorta
- Faial da Terra
- Furnas
- Nossa Senhra dos Remédios
- Povoação
- Ribeira Quente

The largest civil parish (by population and density) is Povoação; the smallest parish is Água Retorta, while Faial da Terra is the most spare community; while Ribeira Quente is the smallest civil parish by area.

== Economy ==
The municipality is sustained by the agriculture and fishing industries, with many of the businesses and commerce situated in the coastal urban center of Povoação. Tourism is also an important part of the regional activities with places like Furnas attracting naturalists and leisure activities.

== Architecture ==
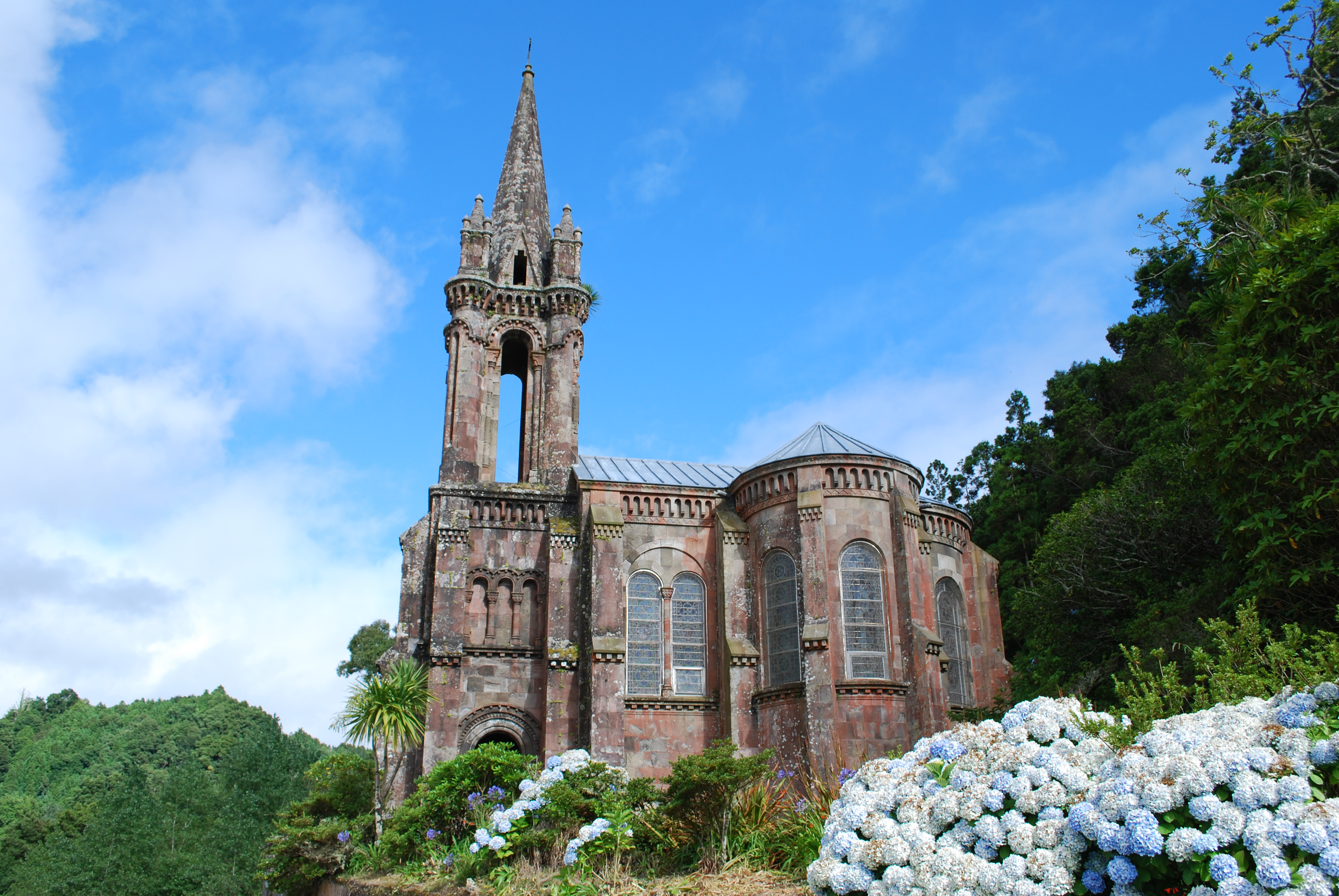
The chapel of Nossa Senhora das Vitórias, the mortuary chapel of the family of José do Canto

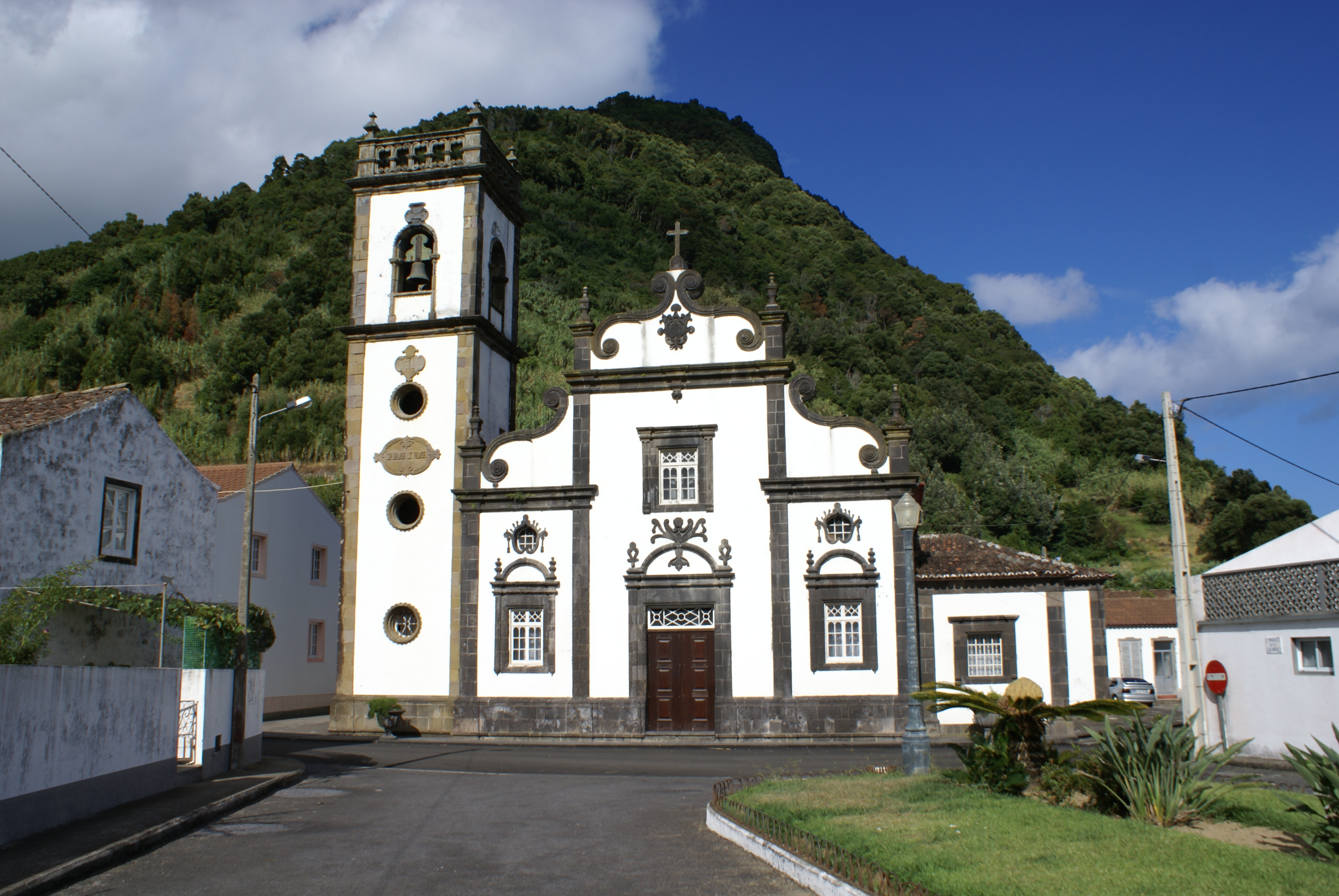
The large church of the small parish of Faial da Terra

=== Civic ===
- Discoverers' Gate (Porta dos Descobrimentos), located on the coast, it is the presumed location that the first discoverers and settlers disembarked on the island at the end of the 1440s.
- Law Court of Povoação (Portuguese: Tribunal Judicial de Povoação)
- Municipal Council of Povoaçao (Câmara Municipal da Povoação), today the main building for the entire municipality, the square building was inaugurated in the 20th century;
- Park and Residence of Murtas (Portuguese: Parque e Casa das Murtas)
- Sub-Regional Hospital of Povoação (Portuguese: Hospital Sub-Regional de Povoação)
- Thermal Spa of Furnas (Portuguese: Estação Termal das Furnas)

=== Religious ===
- Chapel of Nossa Senhora das Vitórias (Portuguese: Capela de Nossa Senhora das Vitórias)
- Church of Nossa Senhora da Mãe de Deus (Portuguese: Igreja Paroquial de Povoação/Igreja da Mãe de Deus), inaugurated on 24 July 1848, it is prized for the gild work and historic image of its patron saint;
- Church of Nossa Senhora da Graça (Portuguese: Igreja Paroquial de Faial da Terra/Igreja de Nossa Senhora da Graça)
- Church of Nossa Senhora da Penha de França (Portuguese: Igreja Paroquial de Água Retorta/Igreja de Nossa Senhora da Penha de França)
- Church of Nossa Senhora dos Remédios (Portuguese: Igreja Paroquial Nossa Senhora dos Remédios/Igreja Nossa Senhora dos Remédios)
- Church of Nossa Senhora de Rosário (Portuguese: Igreja de Nossa Senhora do Rosário na Praça Velha), most commonly known as the Igreja Velha (the Old Church), it was constructed in 1745, on the precise site that the hermitage and cemetery of Senhora da Consolação (Our Lady of Consolation) was erected;
- Church of Santa Ana (Portuguese: Igreja Paroquial das Furnas/Igreja de Santa Ana)
- Church of São Paulo (Portuguese: Igreja Paroquial de Ribeira Quente/Igreja de São Paulo)
- Hermitage of Santa Ana (Portuguese: Ermida de Santa Ana/Igreja Velha)
- Hermitage of Santa Bárbara (Portuguese: Ermida de Santa Bárbara)
