= Furnas =

- Civil parish
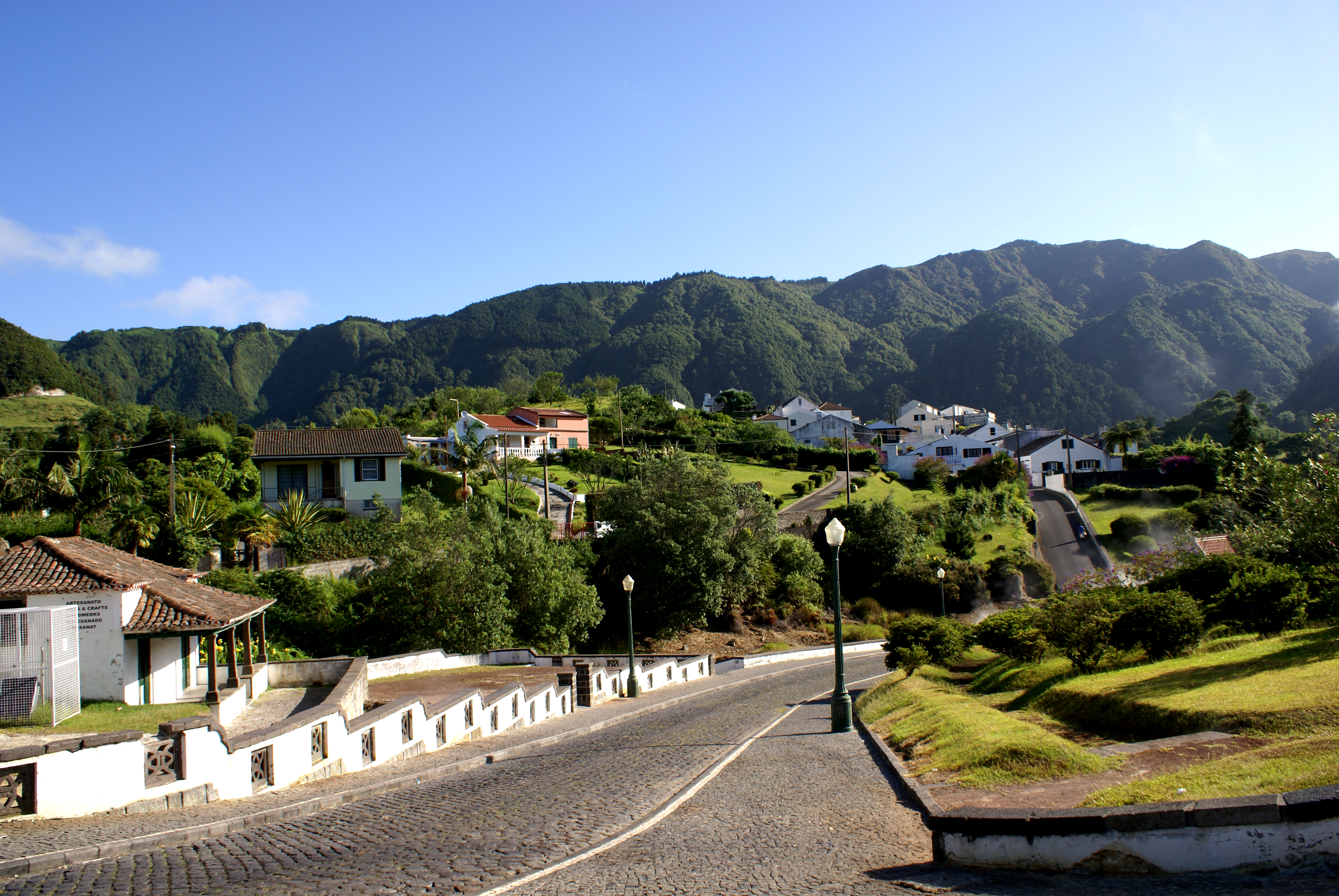
- The Furnas Valley and town

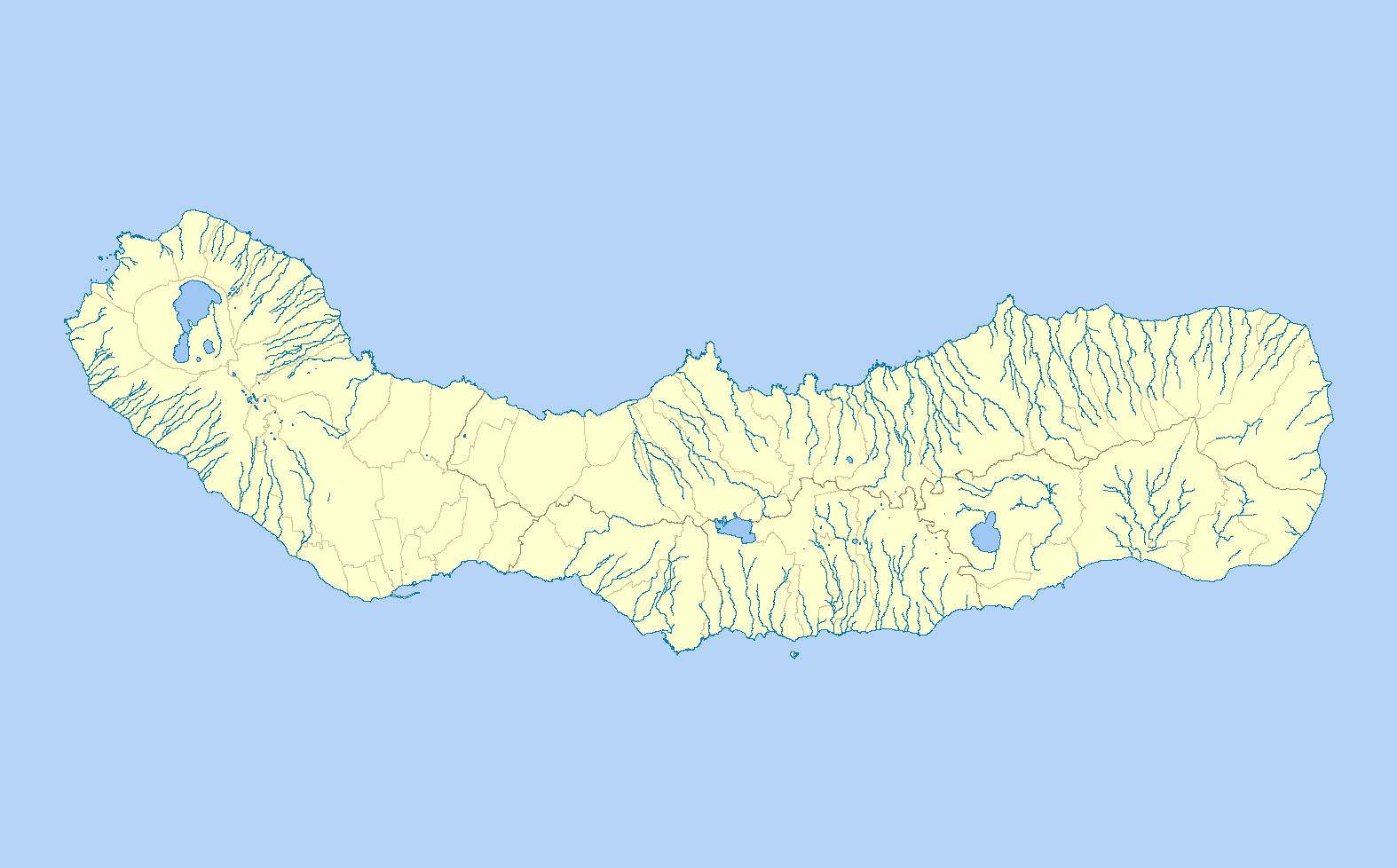
- Location in the Azores Furnas (São Miguel)
- Coordinates: 37°46′20″N 25°18′47″W
- Country: Portugal
- Auton. region: Azores
- Island: São Miguel
- Municipality: Povoação
- Established: 1522

Area
  - Total: 34.43 km^{2} (13.29 sq mi)
- Elevation: 207 m (679 ft)

Population (2011)
  - Total: 1,439
  - Density: 41.79/km^{2} (108.2/sq mi)
- Time zone: UTC−01:00 (AZOT)
  - Summer (DST): UTC+00:00 (AZOST)
- Postal code: 9675-012
- Area code: 296
- Patron: Saint Anne of Furnas Valley

Furnas is a civil parish in the municipality of Povoação on the island of São Miguel in the Portuguese Azores. The population in 2011 was 1,439, in an area of 34.43 km^{2}. The parish is one of the largest in the island and in the Azores. It is located east of Lagoa and Ponta Delgada, west of Povoação and southeast of Ribeira Grande.

== History ==
One of the earliest references to Furnas came from the harvesting of trees in the valley of Furnas, in order to assist the construction of many of the homes destroyed by the 1522 earthquakes and landslides in Vila Franca do Campo. This includes numerous trees used to rebuild the parochial church, a project begun by Donatary-Captain Rui Gonçalves da Câmara. In 1553, his predecessor Manuel da Câmara, issued an edict to re-plant these trees after the area was nearly deforested, and roadways were expanded under his son, Rui Gonçalves da Câmara, in order to develop the area, allowing cattle herding in the valley after 1577.

Still during the tenure of Manuel da Câmara, a chapel was constructed to the invocation of Nossa Senhora da Consolação (Our Lady of Consolation) in 1613, and small residence built for the local priest (who was responsible for masses and the lighting of a lamp in the sacristy). More homes soon appeared in this area around 1615, and a small convent was constructed near the chapel. In 1630, as a consequence of a volcanic eruption in the valley, the area was abandoned. But, new settlers quickly returned to the Furnas valley (mostly from Ponta Garça, Povoação, Vila Franca and Maia) as the land became fertile and better able to sustain a larger population. New roads were constructed on orders between 1682 and 1683, donated by the Baron of Larangeiras.

Even isolated in the interior, the village continued to be vulnerable to pirate attacks. In 1679, Algerian pirates (from the Barbary coast) landed in the Portinho de Agrião, sacked the coastal village of Ribeira Quente, and proceeded to the interior, where they robbed several rams from the valley before returning to the coast. José Pereira Sodré, a resident near Agrião petitioned the governor of São Miguel for one of the cannons that existed at the city hall in Vila Franca; he intended that the armament would be used to defend the area from future attacks: it was rejected.

In 1832, an unknown English settler purchased a large parcel around the crater lake to build a home, but abandoned it and sold it to the English Consul-General at Ponta Delgada, named Vines, in 1855. There Mr. Vines constructed a summer home, with garden, which he named Grená in honour of his wife's familial relations: his spouse was the niece of Daniel O'Connell (who organized the Catholic movement in Ireland) and stayed at their Irish relatives' home, also called Grená. Upon Consul Vine's death, the home was used by a London surgeon named Hinton (who was a publisher of many works on hygiene and hearing), since Catherine Vine did not wish to return to Furnas. After Hinton's death in 1875, the home was used by Jorge Brown, who exploited the home as a hotel for summer tourists for several years. During this period many travellers stayed at the hotel, including Alice Baker (who wrote "A Summer in the Azores with a Glimpse of Madeira") and others who produced literary and scientific reviews of the region. In 1882, Grená was sold by Catherine Vine's son to Jorge Hayes, following the death of Jorge Brown in the same year. It was occupied by José do Canto while his home and chapel were being constructed on the other side of the lake.

In June 1840, the population of the valley of Furnas numbered 1320 inhabitants scattered in 334 homes throughout the basin.

== Geography ==
=== Physical geography ===
Furnas Caldeiras; aerial video

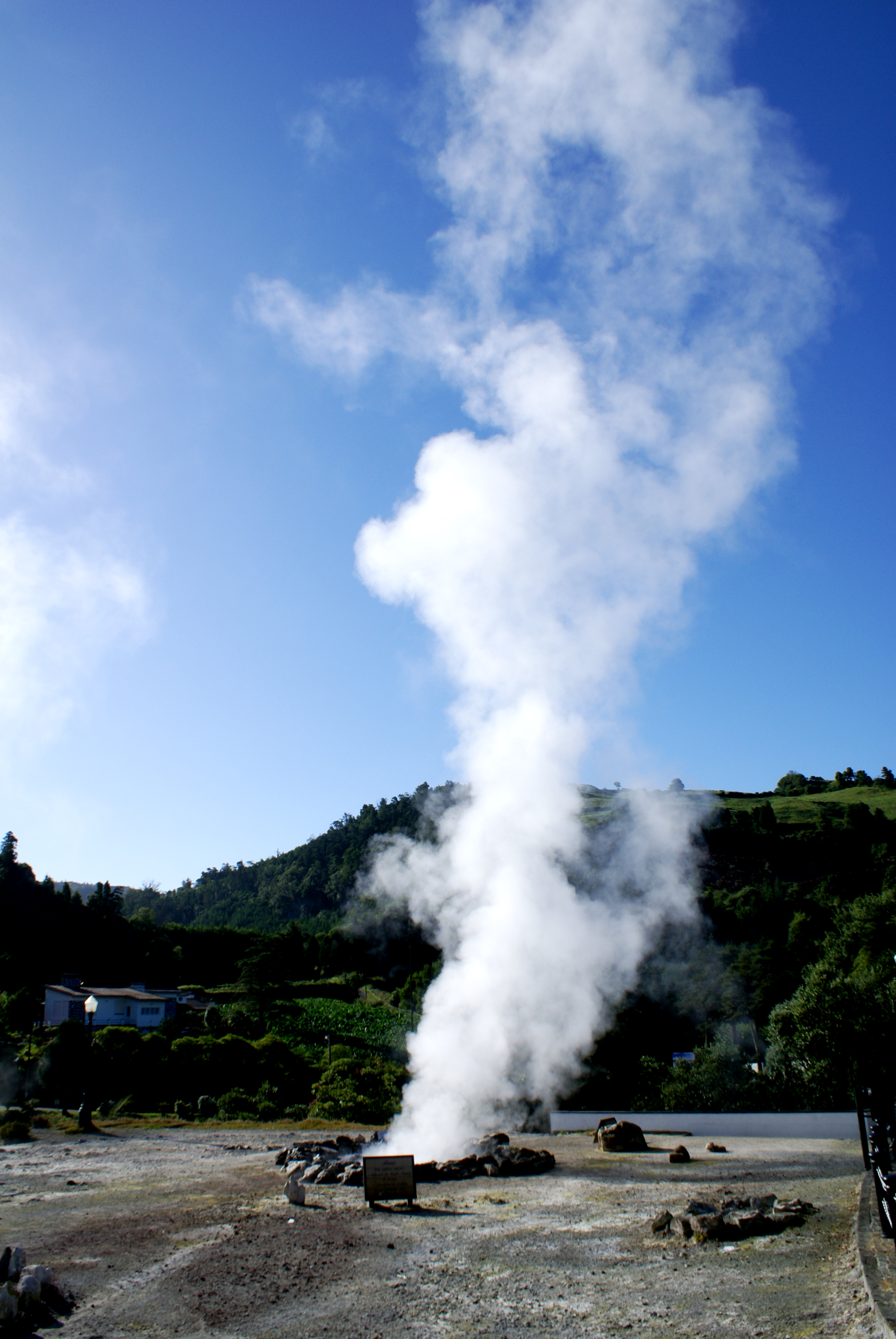
One of the many geysers, hot-springs and fumaroles scattered in the center of the village of Furnas

Furnas
- Vale das Furnas
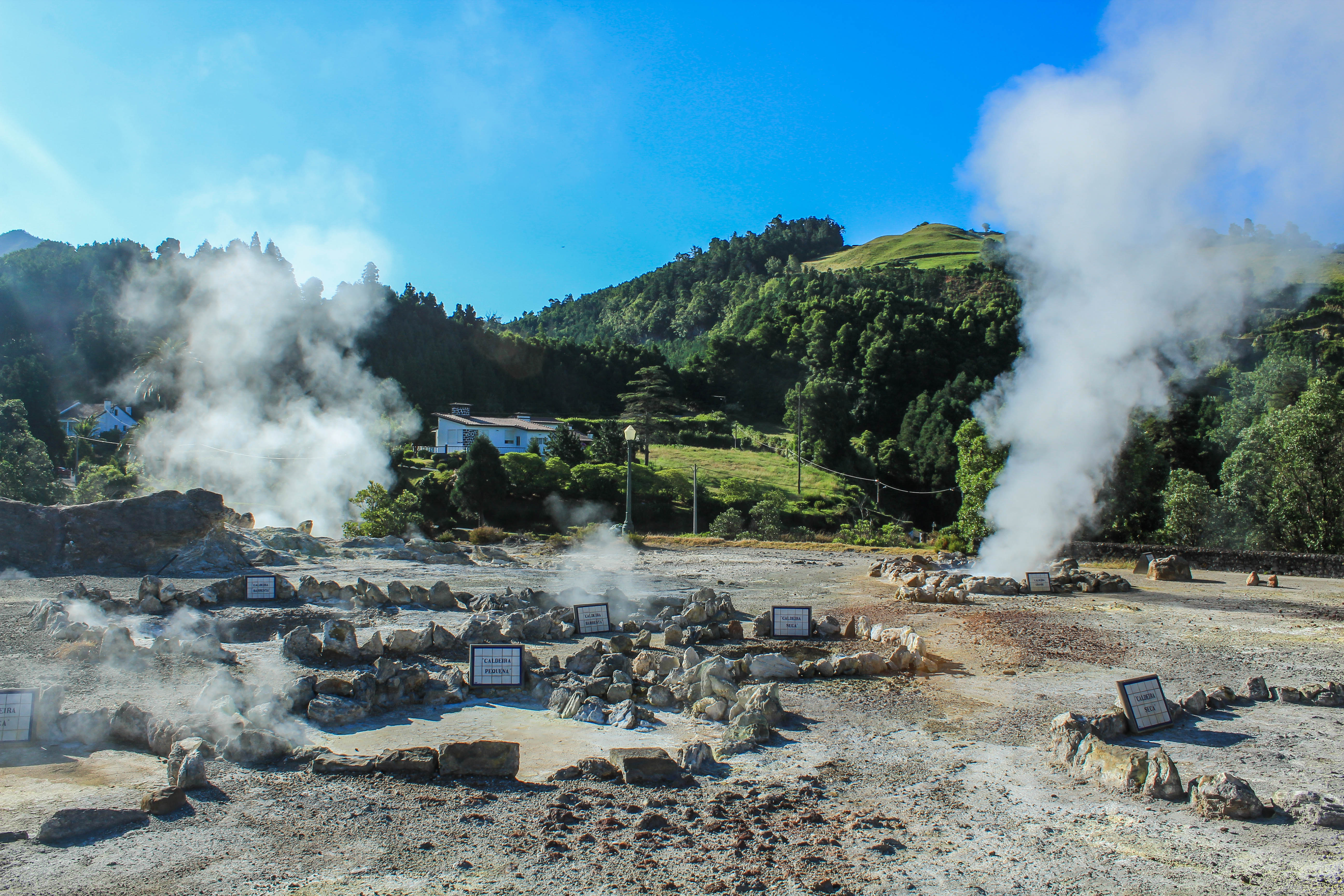
- Hot-springs in the central village of Furnas, São Miguel

Highest point
- Elevation: 198 m (650 ft)
- Prominence: 795 m (2,608 ft)
- Coordinates: 37°46′21″N 25°18′14″W

Geography
- Location: São Miguel, Azores
- Parent range: Volcanic Complex of Furnas

Geology
- Rock age: 30000
- Mountain type: Stratovolcano
- Last eruption: September to November 1630

Furnas is located in the easternmost of three active trachytic volcanoes on the island of São Miguel, in the historically active Volcanic Complex of Furnas. With a complicated 100,000 year history, the central caldera of the Furnas Volcano is a naturally explosive trachyte structure composed of two main calderas, that through formation, collapse and explosion have marked the natural history of the massif. The oldest caldera has a diameter of approximately 7*5.5 km whose escarpment cuts the lava structures of the neighbouring Volcanic Complex of Povoação to the north and northeast and southeast to valley of Ribeira Quente. The second caldera (4.5*3.5 km diameter) dates back 35000 years (the youngest caldera) and is geomorphologically identifiable by the 200 metre wall to the north and northwest. Within the caldera are numerous pumice cones and maars resulting from Plinian and Phreto-plinian eruptions from 5000 years.

Owing to the existence of a population of several thousand people living within and around its caldera it is considered one of the most dangerous volcanoes in archipelago. Throughout its history, volcanic activity at Furnas has been essentially explosive but eruptive styles have varied from mild effusive activity to at least two caldera-forming eruptions 30,000 and 12,000-10,000 years ago. It is considered very active, since ten sub-Plinian eruptions have occurred within the past 5,000 years, producing a total area of 0.9 kilometres square of fairly homogeneous trachytic magma. The first known historical eruption occurred in 1440, just after early settlers started populating the coasts of São Miguel. The latest eruption occurred after the settlement of the Azores archipelago in 1630 A.D., and caused the deaths of 200 people. Eruptions of the Upper Furnas Group were mainly characterised by alternating episodes of magmatic and phreatomagmatic activity producing deposits of inter-bedded volcanic ash and lapilli that overlie the widespread main deposits from the adjacent Fogo volcano. At least three of these eruptions were accompanied by trachyte dome extrusions in the final phases of the eruption.

The western of the two calderas is partially filled by a crater lake, Lagoa das Furnas, at an elevation of 359 metres (1,178 ft) and populated by several fumaroles and mud pools are located at the northern part of the lake. In the central part of the village, springs and geysers are prevalent; thirty springs, each of differing temperatures and chemical compositions, including warm iron-rich streams and piped examples of mineral-rich warm and cold water. The geysers are situated in several basins rich in sodium bicarbonate, boron, fluorine and traces of carbon dioxide. The local inhabitants cook stews in the geysers, most famously the beef stew Cozido das Furnas. The installations of hydrotherapy are in the park and were built in the 19th century.

=== Climate ===
Furnas has an oceanic climate with warm summers and mild, wet winters. It has cooler night-time temperatures than other places at lower altitudes on the island.

Climate data for Furnas, 1973-1990, altitude: 290 m (950 ft), precipitation 1976-2002
Month	Jan	Feb	Mar	Apr	May	Jun	Jul	Aug	Sep	Oct	Nov	Dec	Year
Record high °C (°F)	20.1 (68.2)	19.5 (67.1)	21.7 (71.1)	20.5 (68.9)	24.0 (75.2)	24.3 (75.7)	27.2 (81.0)	28.5 (83.3)	27.4 (81.3)	24.9 (76.8)	23.0 (73.4)	20.9 (69.6)	28.5 (83.3)
Mean daily maximum °C (°F)	15.6 (60.1)	15.5 (59.9)	16.0 (60.8)	16.0 (60.8)	18.2 (64.8)	20.4 (68.7)	22.7 (72.9)	24.3 (75.7)	23.3 (73.9)	20.9 (69.6)	18.1 (64.6)	16.5 (61.7)	19.0 (66.1)
Daily mean °C (°F)	12.0 (53.6)	11.8 (53.2)	12.4 (54.3)	12.4 (54.3)	14.4 (57.9)	16.6 (61.9)	18.5 (65.3)	19.8 (67.6)	18.9 (66.0)	16.8 (62.2)	14.2 (57.6)	12.8 (55.0)	15.1 (59.1)
Mean daily minimum °C (°F)	8.4 (47.1)	8.2 (46.8)	8.8 (47.8)	8.9 (48.0)	10.6 (51.1)	12.8 (55.0)	14.3 (57.7)	15.2 (59.4)	14.5 (58.1)	12.7 (54.9)	10.2 (50.4)	9.2 (48.6)	11.2 (52.1)
Record low °C (°F)	1.3 (34.3)	0.8 (33.4)	0.5 (32.9)	2.7 (36.9)	2.5 (36.5)	4.0 (39.2)	7.0 (44.6)	7.0 (44.6)	7.1 (44.8)	5.5 (41.9)	2.0 (35.6)	1.9 (35.4)	0.5 (32.9)
Average rainfall mm (inches)	223.9 (8.81)	198.1 (7.80)	177.6 (6.99)	146.0 (5.75)	119.7 (4.71)	95.2 (3.75)	50.0 (1.97)	78.8 (3.10)	141.7 (5.58)	195.0 (7.68)	240.7 (9.48)	299.0 (11.77)	1,965.7 (77.39)
Average relative humidity (%)	88	87	85	84	86	85	85	86	87	87	90	90	87
Source: Instituto de Meteorologia, Portuguese Environmental Agency

== Economy ==
Historically, the principal economy in the valley was the production of honey and wax: Jesuit priests had introduced this activity originally, producing a barrel or one-and-a-half barrels annually. Valley farmers also routinely cultivated wheat and legumes, taro, pumpkin, squash and tiger nuts during this period of settlement. In 1661, the Corregidor André Lopes Pinto e Vasconcellos ordered the landowners in Furnas to plant at least one alqueire of taro in order to stave off malnutrition, provide feed for pigs and later in order to provide a source of export trade. Lupin beans were also important crops during this period, usually planted between October and November, with some variation in order to increase soil nutrients and support standard crops, such as maize, fava beans and wheat. In 2016, an EU lifting of milk quotas caused a young dairy farmer, named Paula Rego, to invent a new kind of cheese called Queijo do Vale, whose distinguishing feature is the fact that it is bathed in water collected from local hot springs, giving it a high mineral content.

== Architecture ==
Apart from many of the medieval-type local residences, and the modern interpretations of these historic homes, there are other distinct buildings erected within the territory of Furnas:

=== Civic ===
- Park and Residence of the Murtas (Portuguese: Parque e Casa das Murtas)
- Park of Terra Nostra (Portuguese: Parque Terra Nostra)
- Thermal Spa of Furnas (Portuguese: Estação termal das Furnas)

=== Religious ===
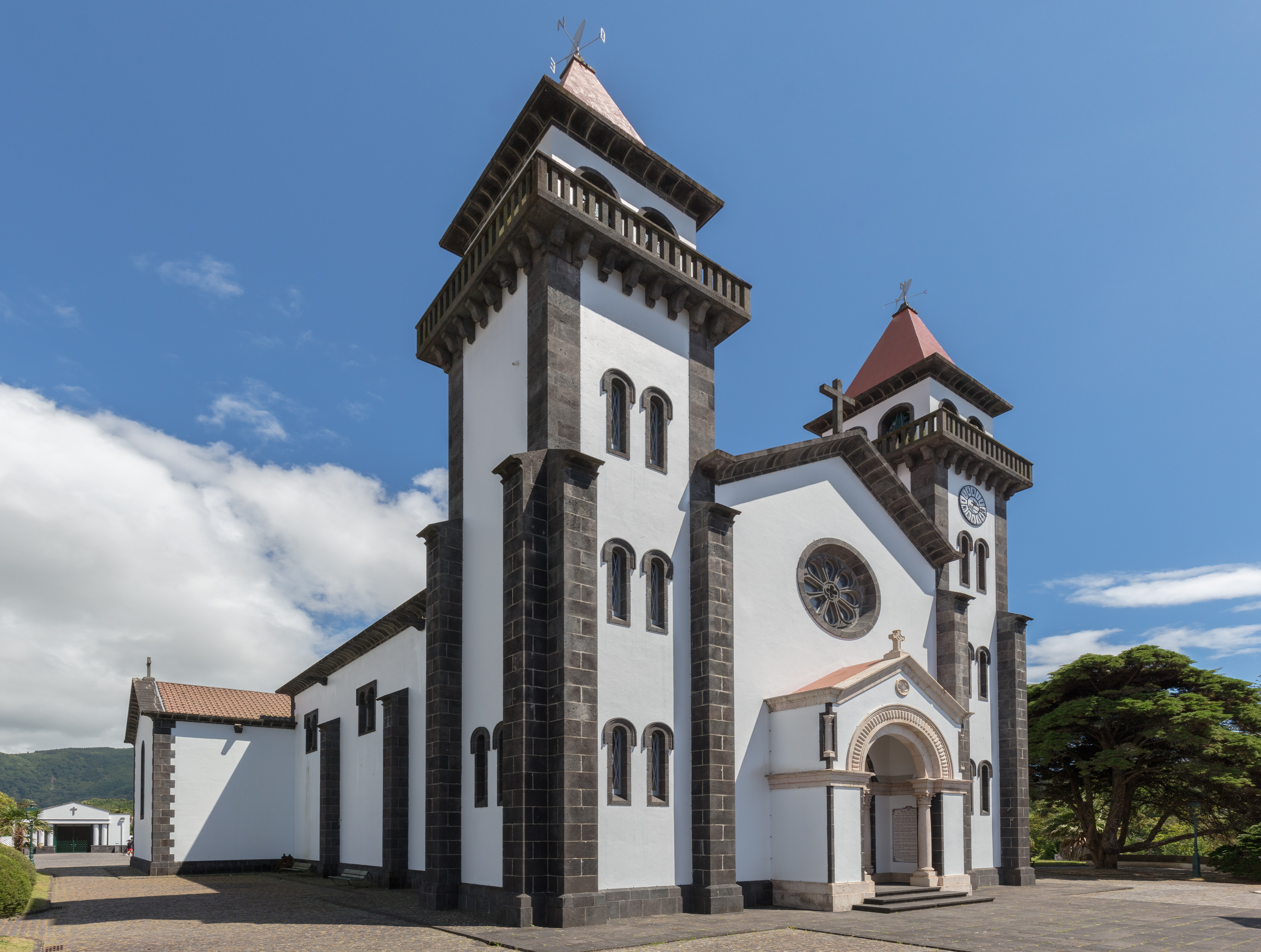
Church of Nossa Senhora da Alegria

- Chapel of Nossa Senhora das Vitórias - located on the margin of Furnas Lake, the funerary chapel was constructed by José do Canto the "gentlemen-farmer" and botanist of São Miguel, to serve as a mausoleum for him and his wife. Constructed in a Neo-Gothic style, it is a cathedral writ small, in an isolated location, on property held by the owner.
- Hermitage of Santa Ana (Portuguese: Ermida de Santa Ana/Igreja Velha)
- Church of Santa Ana (Portuguese: Igreja Paroquial das Furnas/Igreja de Santa Ana)
- Church of Nossa Senhora da Alegria (Portuguese: Igreja de Nossa Senhora da Alegria)

== See also ==
- List of volcanoes in Azores
