= Lagoa do Fogo =

Lake in Azores, Portugal

Lagoa do Fogo Lake of Fire
- A view of Lagoa do Fogo from the scenic overlook of Lagoa do Fogo III
- Nickname: Fogo

Location
- Country: Portugal
- Autonomous Region: Azores
- Group: Eastern
- Island: São Miguel
- Municipalities: Ribeira Grande, Vila Franca do Campo, Lagoa

Physical characteristics
- Source: Água de Pau Massif
- Length: 3 km (1.9 mi)
- Basin size: 21.82 km^{2} (8.42 sq mi)
- Discharge
  - location: Atlantic Ocean

Lagoa do Fogo ("Lake of Fire") is a crater lake within the Água de Pau Massif stratovolcano in the center of the island of São Miguel in the Portuguese archipelago of the Azores. The highest lake located on the island of São Miguel, the region is protected by governmental regulation that does not permit any constructions around the lake.

== History ==
Since 1974, the Lagoa do Fogo had been under the administration of national legislation as a protected area, forming the Reserva da Lagoa do Fogo (Natural Reserve of Lagoa do Fogo) an area that includes approximately 2,182 hectares (21,820,000 m^{2}), founded by Decree-law 152/74 (15 April 1974). It was also covered under a supplementary Decree-Law 9/79.

The Reserva Natural da Lagoa do Fogo was created in 1982, under terms of Regional Decree 10/82/A on 18 June 1982. Part of the area was included in the Natura 2000 network, and classified as the Site of Communitarian Importance of Lagoa do Fogo.

The nature reserve was integrated into the Nature Park of São Miguel, under Decree-Law 19/2008A (8 July 2008), which included the entire watershed of the Laoga.

== Geography ==
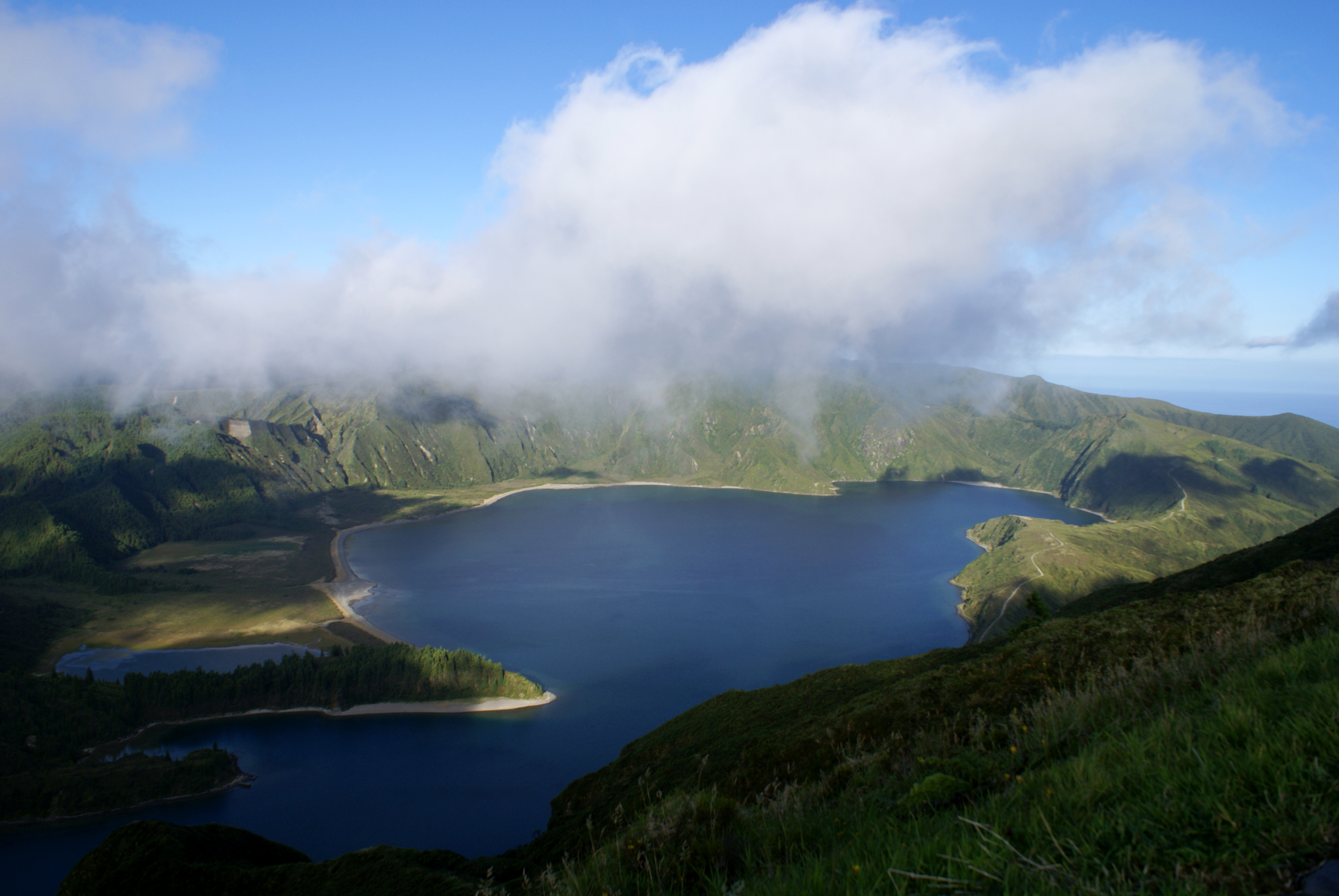
A view of the lake from the scenic overlook of Pico do Barrosa

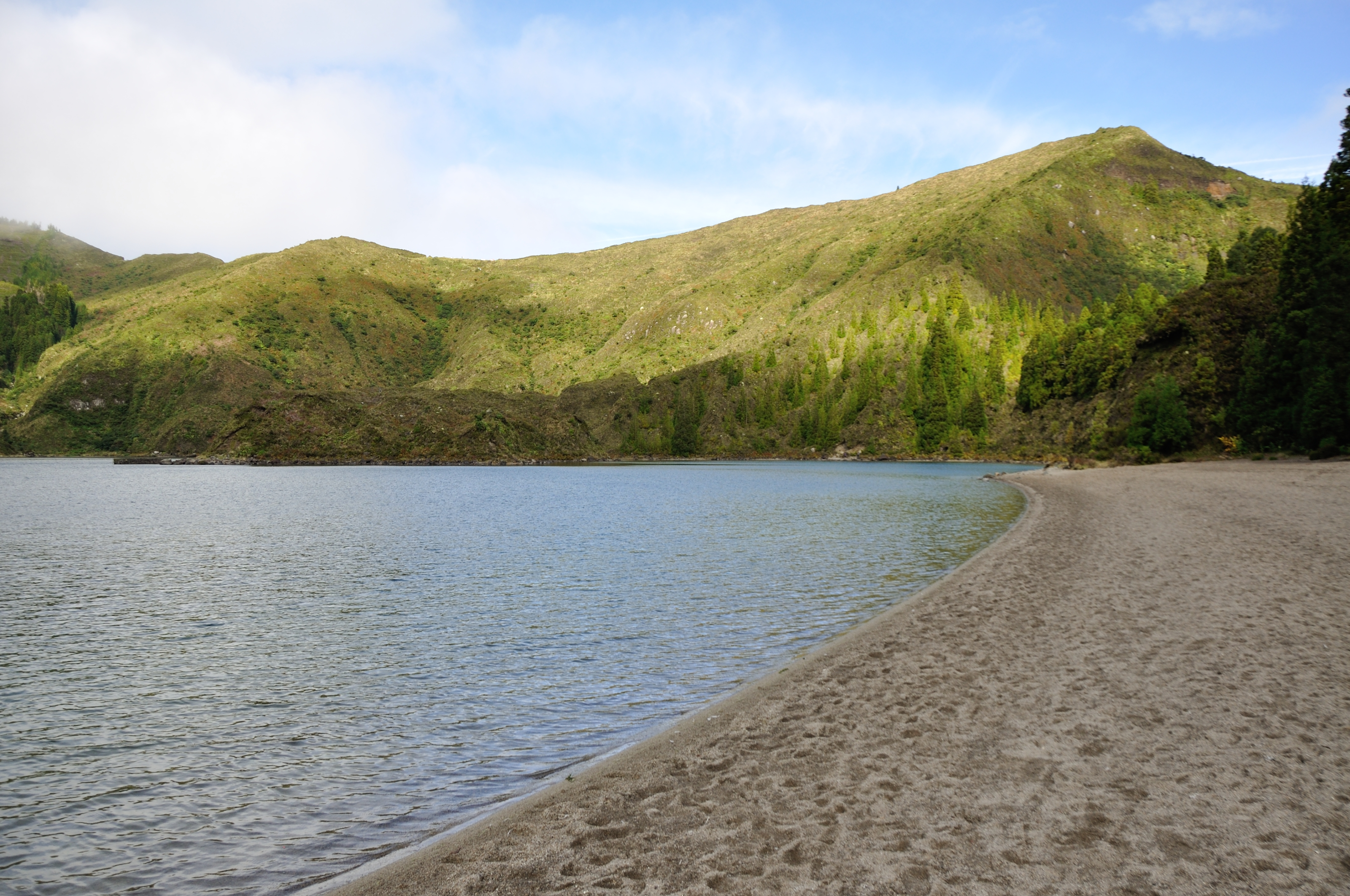
The fine, sedimentary beach of Lagoa do Fogo, with view of crater rim

Lagoa do Fogo is one of the largest of the waterbodies in the Azores, and occupies the central caldera of the Água de Pau Massif, in the central area of the island of São Miguel. The caldera is the youngest volcano on the island of São Miguel, formed approximately 15 000 years ago, resulting from the collapse at the top of the volcano, some 5000 years ago. The last eruption occurred in 1563. It falls within the borders of the civil parishes of Conceição, Matriz and Água de Alto, in the municipalities of Ribeira Grande and Vila Franca do Campo, respectively.

It is part of the hydrological watershed of the same name. The margins of the lake are located 575 metres (1,886 ft) above sea level, although the crater rim, which extends to Pico da Barrosa is located at approximately 949 metres (3,114 ft) altitude. The internal flanks of the crater (characterized by abrupt 48º cliffs) are occupied by the elliptical lake, 3 by 2.5 kilometres (1.9 mi × 1.6 mi) and 30 metres (98 ft) deep.

The carved relief affects the course of hydrographic run-off, which is accentuated by torrential precipitation in the region, resulting in accentuated erosion and deposition along the margins. A majority of the watercourses are temporary or torrential, with the greatest run-off occurring in the winter, and little in the summer, with few permanent ravines. There are only two permanent effluents in the lake, one to the western crater rim in Barrosa, and the other in the south-southeast. The lake is maintained from mainly, direct precipitation over the caldera and from superficial run-off from the watersheds, where nutrient infiltration is common. The lake's waters support local aquifers in the lowlands and provide potable water to the settlements in the southern flanks of the caldera.

=== Biome ===
From the west to south, the crater is covered in brush and scrub, while in the east and north (where declives are minor) the vegetation is much denser and covered in some forest. Between the crater wall and lake is a northern margin/beach consisting of sedimentary, with little vegetation. Much of the land surrounding the crater is occupied by largely parcels of median 283 hectares (2,830,000 m^{2}) in size, 61 hectares (610,000 m^{2}) of forested production and endemic Macronesian species. Since 2001, the caldera and lake have been part of the Rede Natura network of sites of communitarian interest, for special conservation by European Commission (dated 28 December 2001) and the Habitats Directive 92/43/CEE. There are no human settlements or operations within the crater.

Within the perimeter of the nature reserve, lake and caldera flanks, are many endemic Azorean plant species, including the Azores juniper (Juniperus brevifolia), Azores laurel (Laurus azorica) and buckthorn (Frangula azorica), in addition to St. John's wort (Hypericum foliosum), Azores heather (Erica azorica) and Mediterranean spurge (Euphorbia stygiana).

Small birds are the primary animal species within the caldera, in addition to some larger birds, such as kites or seagulls; terrestrial birds include the Azores wood pigeon (Columba palumbus azorica), Azorean buzzard (Buteo buteo rothschildi), the grey wagtail (Motocilla cinerea) and the Azorean common blackbird (Turdus merula azorensis), as well as marine birds such as yellow-legged gull (Larus cachinnans atlantis) and the common tern (Sterna hirundo).
