= Ribeira Quente =

- Civil parish
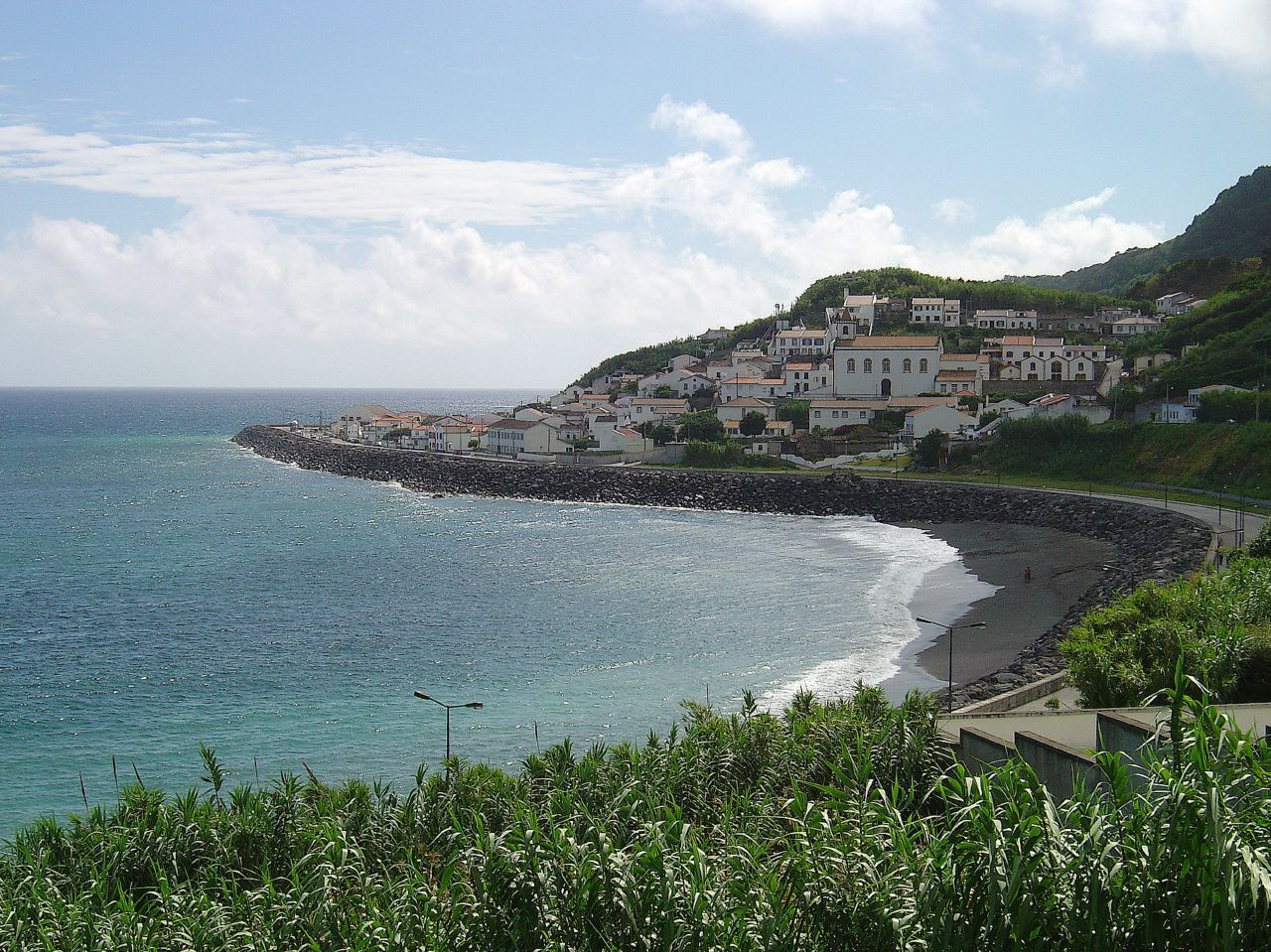
- The locality of Fogo, the location of the parish church, and behind the escarpment, the popular Fogo beach

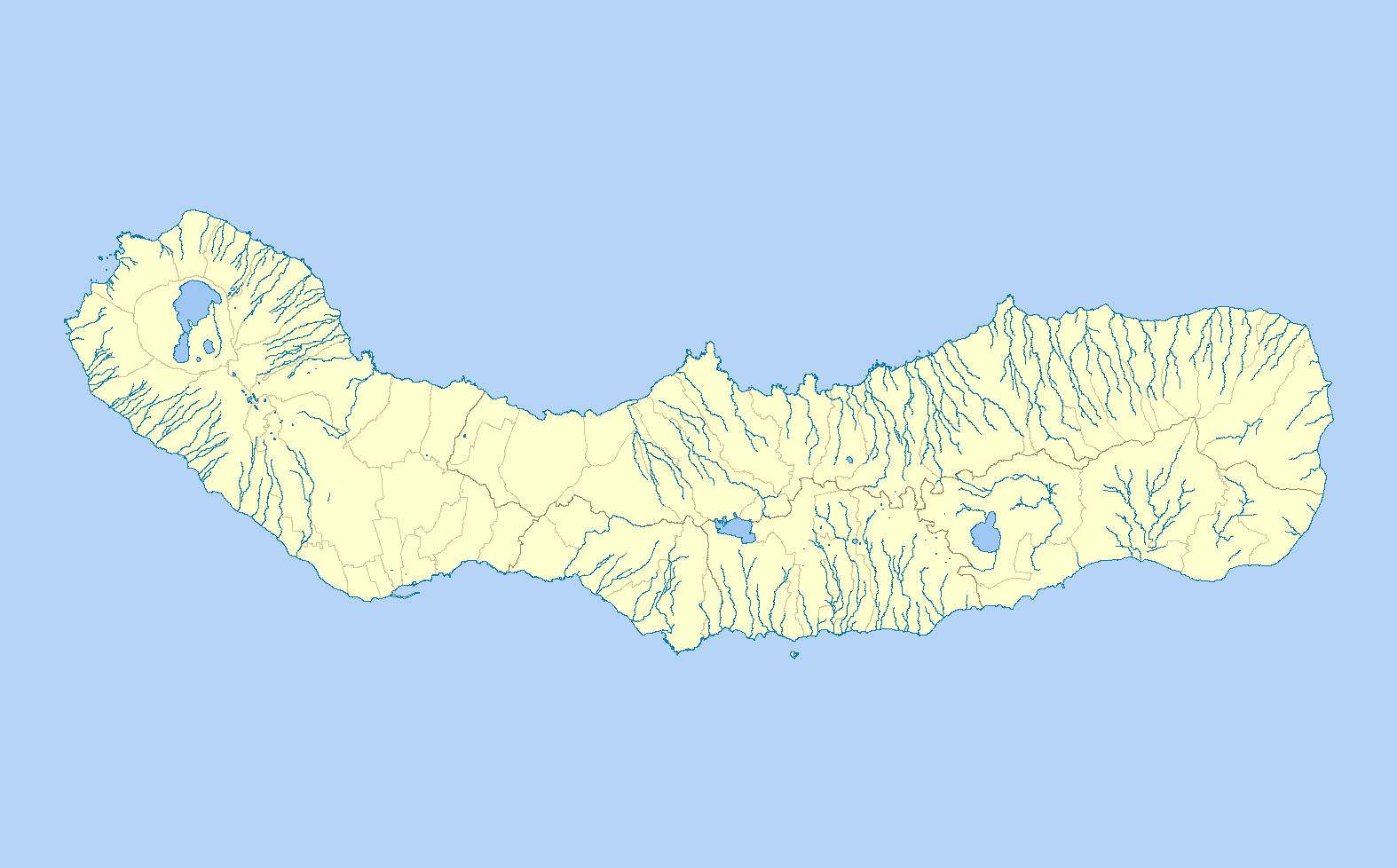
- Location in the Azores Ribeira Quente (São Miguel)
- Coordinates: 37°43′50″N 25°18′25″W
- Country: Portugal
- Auton. region: Azores
- Island: São Miguel
- Municipality: Povoação
- Established: Settlement: fl. 1522; Parish: c. 1765; Civil parish: 24 June 1943

Area
  - Total: 9.04 km^{2} (3.49 sq mi)
- Elevation: 11 m (36 ft)

Population (2011)
  - Total: 767
  - Density: 84.8/km^{2} (220/sq mi)
- Time zone: UTC−01:00 (AZOT)
  - Summer (DST): UTC+00:00 (AZOST)
- Postal code: 9675-174
- Area code: 292
- Patron: São Paulo

Ribeira Quente is a civil parish in the municipality of Povoação in the Portuguese archipelago of the Azores. The population in 2011 was 767, in an area of 9.04 km^{2}. It is the smallest (by area), the lowest (by elevation) and the southernmost of the parishes in municipality. It contains the localities Castelo, Eira das Freiras, Fogo, Ribeira Quente, Ponta da Albufeira and Ponta do Garajau.

== History ==
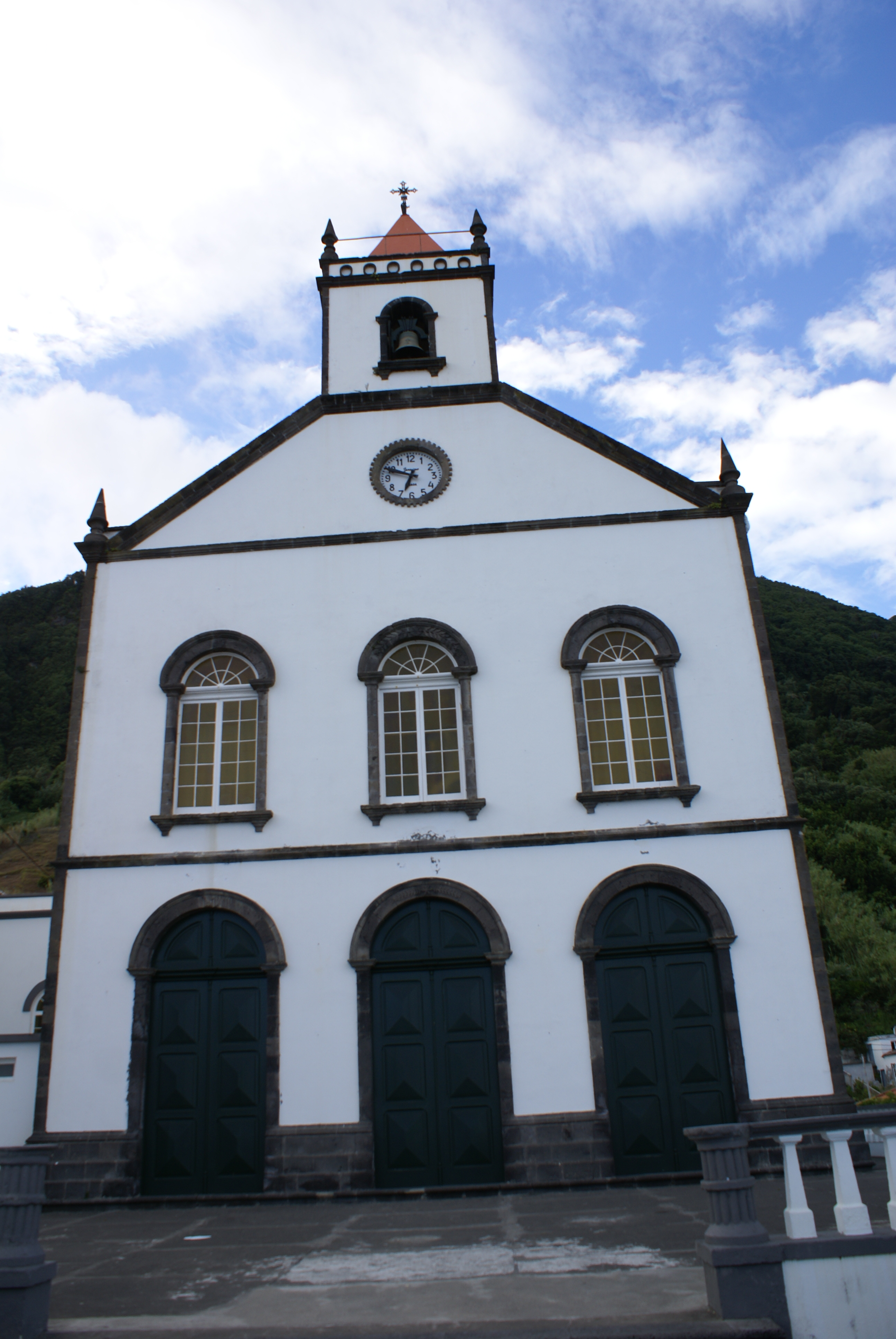
Front façade of the parochial church of São Paulo, reconstructed between 1796 and 1798

Around the middle of the 15th century, the first settlers began occupying land along the coast of what would become Ribeira Quente. Sometime in 1588, a huge landslide from the valley of Furnas, provoked by intense rainfall, caused the expansion of the land in Ribeira Quente. A similar volcanic eruption on 2 September 1630, within the Furnas craters, also provoked a debris flow of debris, that inundated the river and covered the coast, limiting the access of local shipping that once crossed the area. It was within this problem environment that a small sedentary community continued occupy and develop along the coast. This community was populated by a poor peasant class, that includes generations of fishermen, for the greater part of its history. A local historian once described the heritage of this community, and particular, the rise of a few families:

"If we examine, by supposition, based on physio-Physiognomy appearances, we can say that the largest ethnic group in Ribeira Quente, (the Regos) due to their dark skin or their comportment and complexion, could have something to do with the Sousas, Arrudas and Monteiros from Santa Maria; with the Botelhos and Bentos of Vila Franca and Povoação Velha, or even that the Resendes and Bentos from Faial da Terra. But the Peixotos from Ribeira Quente, that immense clan, which always identified itself with the sea and only with the sea?...The physical complexion, between medium and tall, violent temperament and complicated discussion, which quickly turned to pacificism, was a beautiful group, men as well as women. With a red-freckled skin, vivid blue eyes, they are markedly different from other peoples, just as those peoples who settled in Relva and Bretanha, and which many historians mention or identify in order not to offend historical susceptibility: the Peixotos of Ribeira Quente were prolific and brave in the sea. The women of that clan are a species of warrior women, during a marked time. Whether it was in domestic work, or in the fields or others, for their physical strength, they called them beasts of burden. Fundamentally, the Peixotos of Ribeira Grande were the perfect prototypes of the Nordic peoples."

Around 1765, the first chapel dedicated to São Paul was established by peoples from Vila Franca do Campo; at the time, Ribeira Quente was a parish within this municipality. A second temple was built around 1796–98, when the church did not provide sufficient space for the growing community, and after the original church was damaged due to its proximity to the sea.

The Fort of São Paulo was an important part of the communities defence during the era of piracy. Located west of Fogo beach, an area where privateers and pirates could easily disembark, the Fort was established in an area with high cliffs; by 1817 the Fort was in ruins and its artillery removed. In 1839, Ribeira Quente was integrated into the municipality of Povoação, which was obliged to construct a rudimentary road, the Caminho do Redondo, as part of its act of union with the municipality. It was during the visit of King Carlos I of Portugal that a stone marker was placed to commemorate the beginning of the construction of the access road: this project would only be completed 37 years later.

=== 20th century ===
During the first half of the 20th century, one of the larger engineering projects carried out on the island of São Miguel was the construction of two tunnels (referred locally as the Tuneis de Liberidade) that linked Furnas to the southern village. The first tunnel was inaugurated in 1935, while the second occurred four years later. This marked the end of the community's isolation from the rest of the island; until this time, the village could only be accessed by dirt road, horse or cattle-carts (approximately 360 years since its founding). These project was part of a plan for greater economic and social development in the region, resulting in the re-qualification and improvements to roadlinks, and the expansion of the fishing port (which was completed in the middle of the century).

By this time, the community, which was no more than a locality in the parish of Furnas, was elevated to the status of administrative parish on 24 June 1943. This was due to the efforts of its parish priest, Father José Jacinto da Costa (locally referred to as Padre José Mansinho): at the time the population had reached 1800 residents. The following year, the first elected members of the Junta de Freguesia (Civil Parish Committee), Luís Linhares de Deus (President/Mayor), João Jacinto Rita (Treasurer) and João Vieira Jerónimo (Secretary) take office, along with the parishes first police authority, Francisco Pacheco de Medeiros. The population of the community would continue to grow, reaching 2421 residents by 1965, where it would begin to decrease due to emigration.

On 26 June 1952, an earthquake in the region of Furnas caused the almost total destruction of the residential homes in the parish.

In 1965, in order to mark the parishes 100 year anniversary, the community of Ribeira Quente gathered at the beach to escort their patron saint in a 27 ship/boat flotilla between the parish and Povoação.

On the morning of 31 October 1997, the community would be rocked by a landslide caused by weaknesses in the earth after a night of intense rain-showers. The landslide engulfed the homes between the localities of Fogo and Ribeira Quente, killing 29 people who lived in the area of Canada da Igreja. Owing to the areas vulnerability and remains of the dead, the area was formally incorporated by the regional government into the Avenida Marginal, limiting the reconstruction of homes and resulting in a coastal tract of road without buildings (limited by new port and agglomeration of Fogo). The region continues to be susceptible to landslides, and resulted in the reinforcement of escarpment overlooking the Fogo beach in 2012. Regardless, the community has witnessed several incidents of loss of access caused by landslides. On 15 November 2012, another landslide caused the interruption of access, while not sustaining damages to property. Representatives of the Secretaria Regional do Turismo e Transportes (Regional Secretariate for Tourism and Transport) indicated that about 1 kilometre (0.62 mi) of road near the tunnels was affected, but still allowed access.

== Geography ==
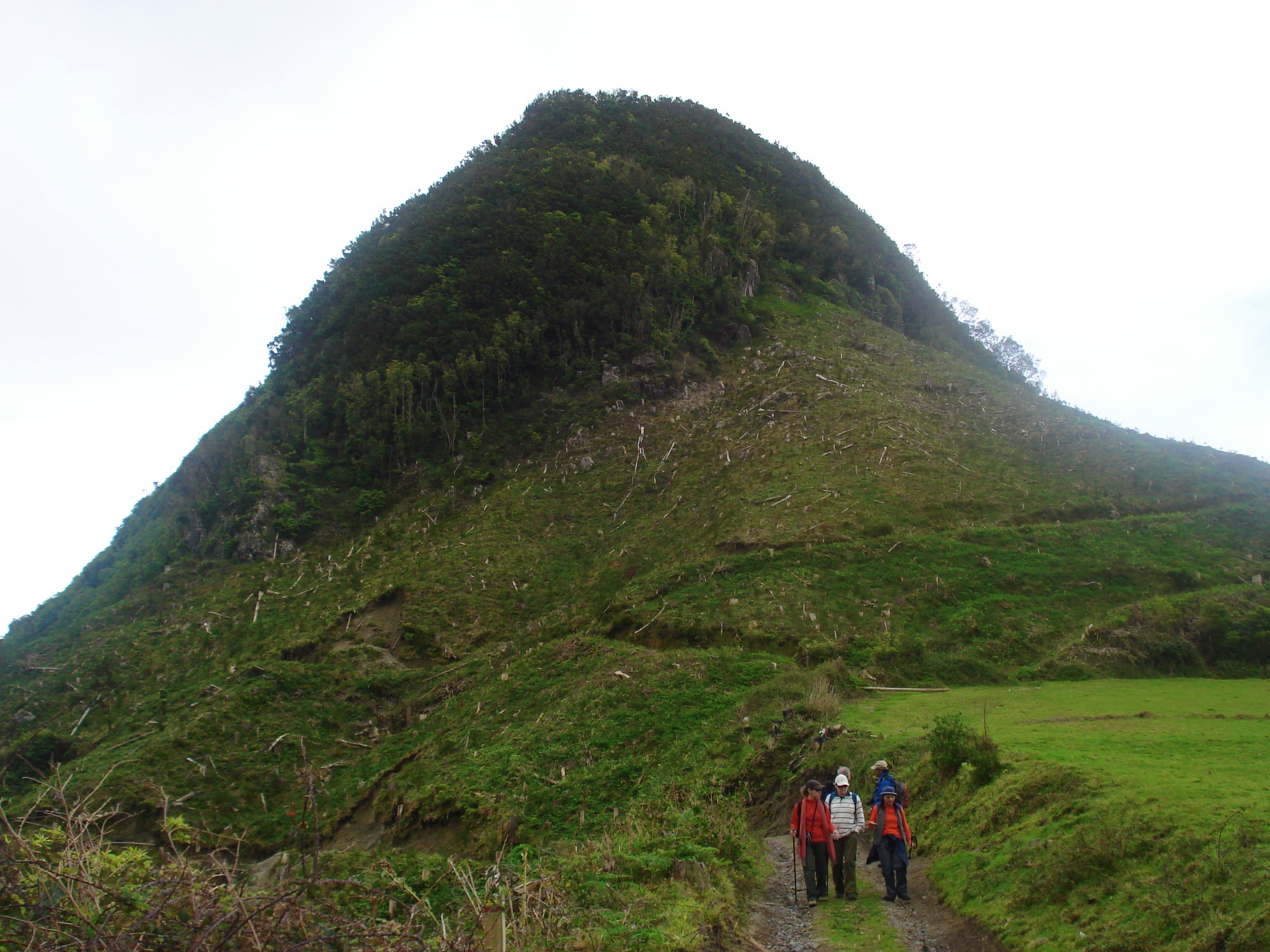
The hilltop of Pico de Agrião, the highest point in the parish

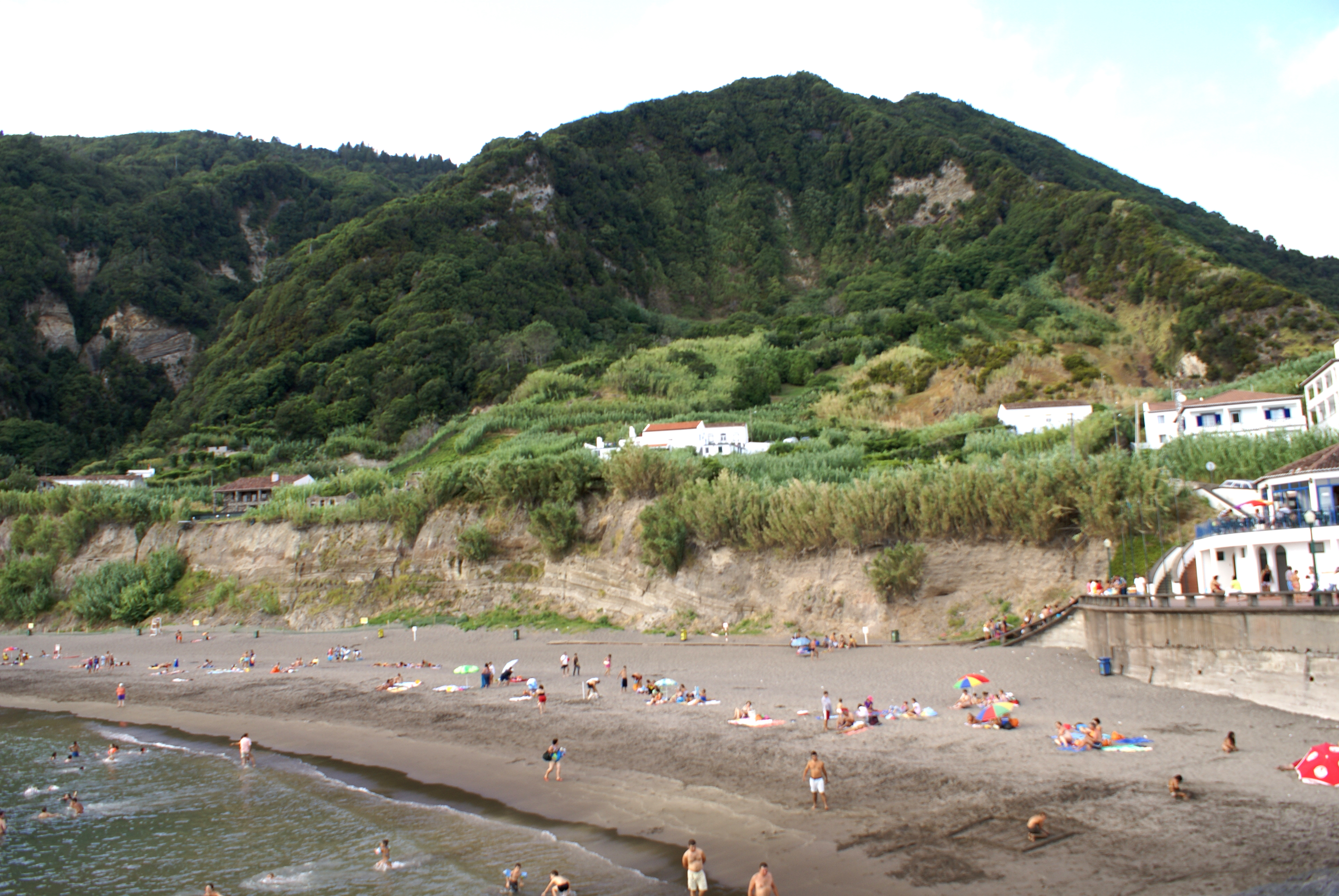
The Fogo Beach located on the western part of Ribeira Quente

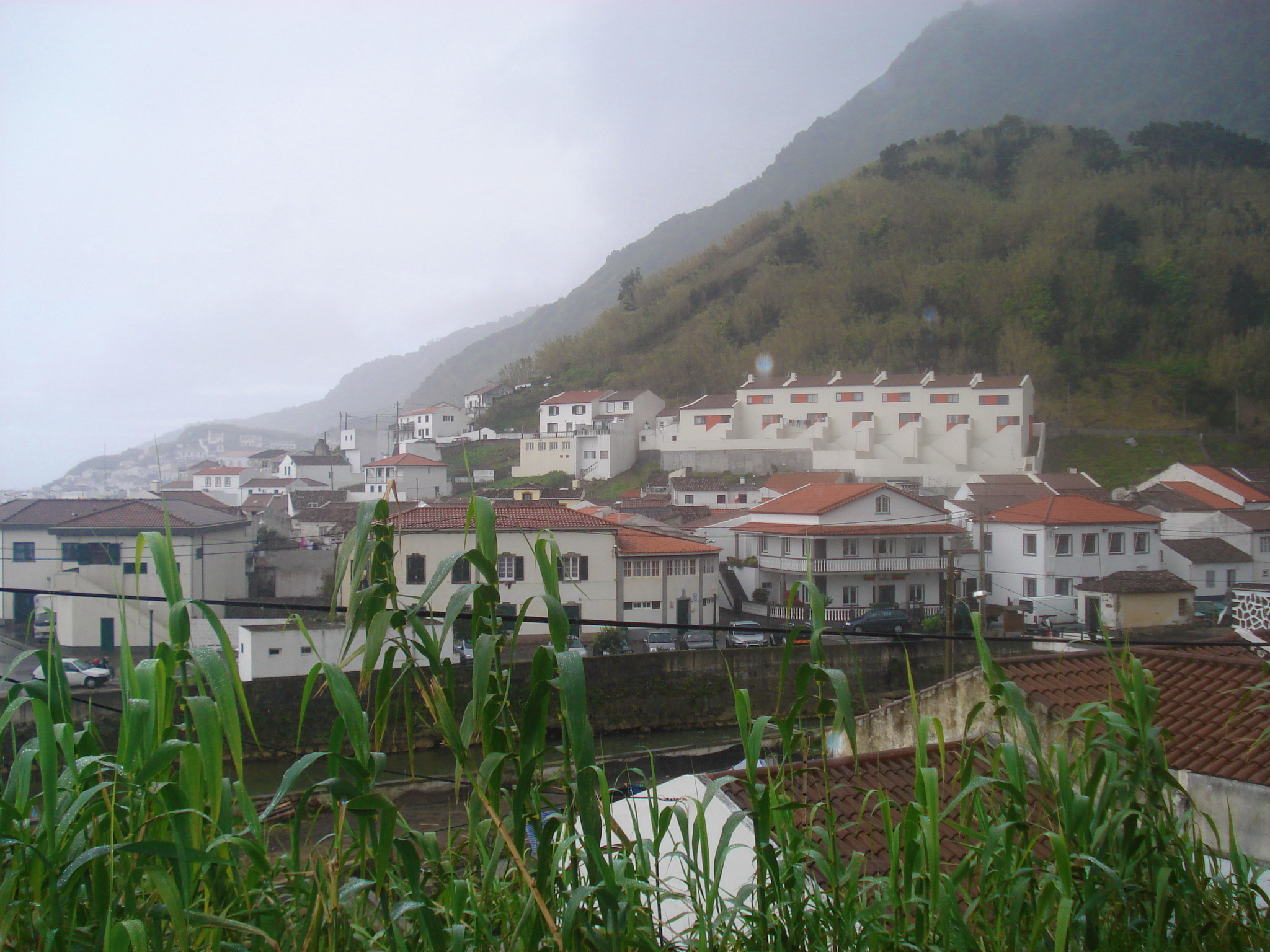
The misty skies in the locality of Ribeira Quente, alongside the namesake stream

This is a coastal community, at the mouth of a major ravine and bordered by the municipality of Vila Franca do Campo on the west, the parishes of Furnas to the north, and Povoação to the east. Although it pertained to the religious community of Vila Franca do Campo, it was incorporated into Povoação in the early part of the 20th century.

Many of the lands in the northern part of the parish are owned by José do Canto and the benevolent society of Furnas, fronting the hilltop of Pico dos Bodes. To the south, until the coast, is the ravine Ribeira do Agrião, while the Grota do Tufo carves an access to the coastal community. Although the northeast of the parish has significant andesite deposits and the northwest primarily basalt, the parish is composed chiefly of pyroclastic materials and projectiles, with deposits of ash located in the central area of the parish. It is located in a seismic area marked by regional tectonic structures and by the volcanic craters of Furnas and Povoação; there are visible examples of dykes, faults and landslides associated with historical earthquakes.

The northern part of the parish is part of the protected zone associated with the Lagoa das Furnas crater lake. Generally, the land use in this area is limited, although classification of land-use in Ribeira Quente covers a range of seven classes (Classes I-VII), with progressively increasing limitation levels. Owing to the forested spaces, levels of protection and urbanization there are few areas available for agricultural production. There are great differences in altitude within the parish, owing to the mountainous and morphological nature of the area. The slopes (between 6-20% incline) along the coast and interior condition many of the land-uses and levels of erosion, and have reduced the access to the community.

Physically, the population groups are concentrated in two areas: the main village of Ribeira Quente and a smaller agglomeration called Fogo. Ribeira Quente is situated at the convergence of the Ribeira dos Tambores with the ocean, and is the site of the main fishing port, adjacent homes, commercial businesses and administrative buildings. The locality of Fogo surrounds the main parochial church of São Paulo, erected between 1911 and 1917. In this area is a small bay and main beach: Praia do Fogo. The existence of hydrothermal vents makes the waters in this area popular with visitors and locals alike, owing to the tepid waters in comparison to other coastal pools.

== Economy ==
The fishery, where approximately 133 claim income, represents 10.8% of the island's catches in 1985. Even without major infrastructural improvements the area's fishery maintained a reasonable rate of return. The improvements in the ports of Ribeira Quente and Povoação resulted in greater catches and expansion of the local fleet, which was responsible for the largest catches of tuna on the island.

== Architecture ==
Apart from the many older, generational residences and estates in the region, the parish has the following buildings classified by the national registry:

- Church of São Paulo (Portuguese: Igreja Paroquial de Ribeira Quente/Igreja de São Paulo), the parochial church of Ribeira Grande was based in a hermitage constructed in 1665, that was later abandoned, and in 1799, a new hermitage was constructed near the sea. Successive damage by storms along the southern coast, resulted in the construction of a new church to support the local community. In 1917, a great festival was organized, on the occasion of the benediction of the church constructed to replace the hermitage, presented by the Bishop of Angra, D. Manuel Damasceno da Costa. The altar in the church was presented to the parish by the clergy of the Convent of Graça (in Ponta Delgada), whose church was dismantled after the proclamation of the Republic, along with various images (most damaged).
