= Fontinhas =

- Civil parish
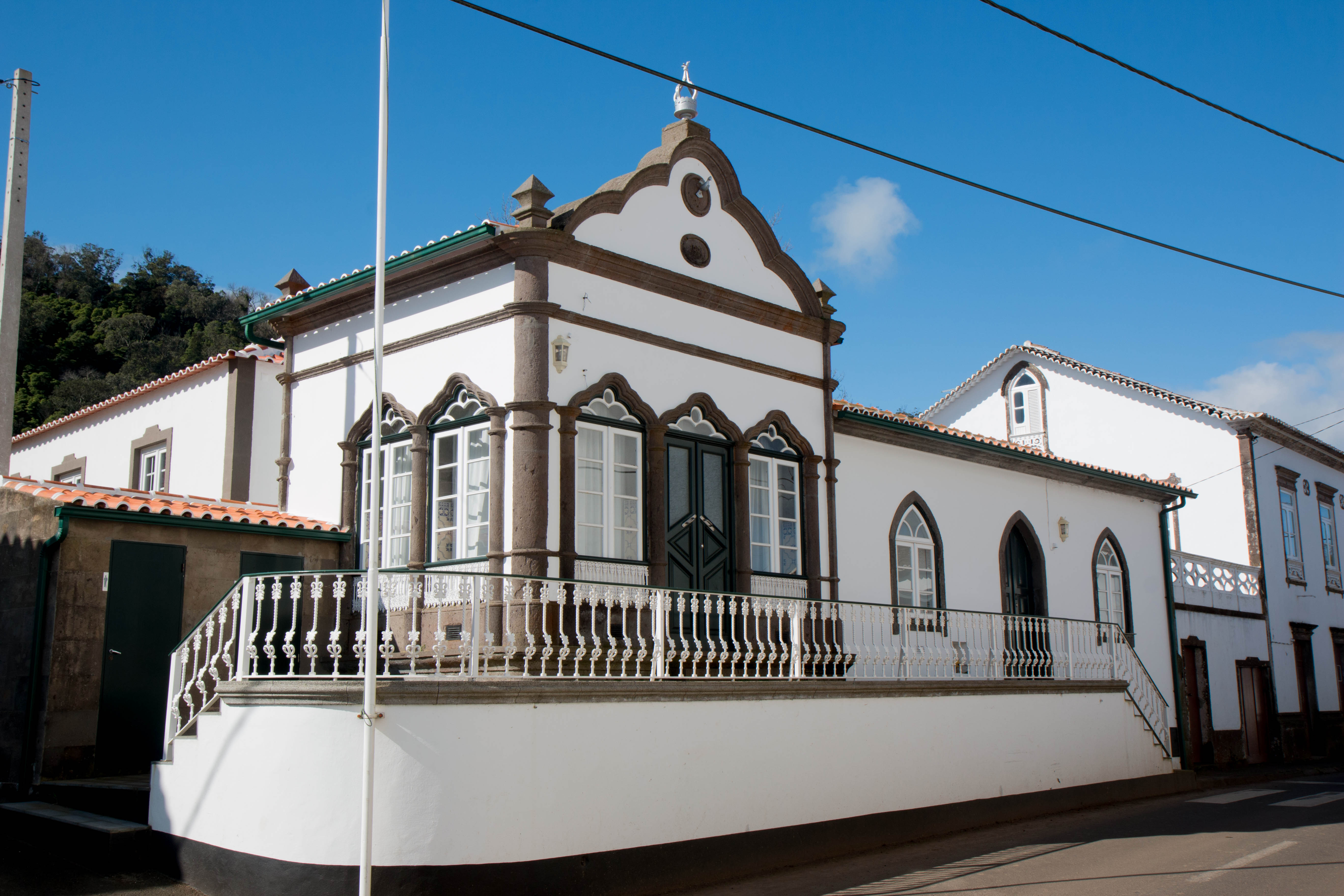

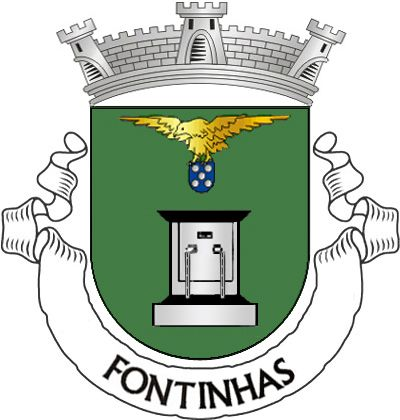
- Coat of arms

- Location in the Azores Fontinhas (Terceira)
- Coordinates: 38°44′29″N 27°6′27″W
- Country: Portugal
- Auton. region: Azores
- Island: Terceira
- Municipality: Praia da Vitória

Area
  - Total: 12.14 km^{2} (4.69 sq mi)
- Elevation: 131 m (430 ft)

Population (2011)
  - Total: 1,594
  - Density: 131.3/km^{2} (340.1/sq mi)
- Time zone: UTC−01:00 (AZOT)
  - Summer (DST): UTC+00:00 (AZOST)
- Postal code: 9760-211
- Area code: 295
- Patron: Nossa Senhora da Pena
- Website: www.jf-fontinhas.com

Fontinhas is a civil parish in the municipality of Praia da Vitória, Terceira Island in the Portuguese Azores. The population in 2011 was 1,594, in an area of 12.14 km^{2} (4.69 sq mi). It contains the localities Acima do Cabouco, Canada da Fonte, Canada do Barreiro, Canada do Coxo, Canada do Pico, Canada dos Batistas, Canada dos Doidos, Fontinha and Fontinhas.
