= Forte do Terreiro =

Fort

Coordinates: 38°39′15″N 27°16′46″W

Forte do Terreiro is a fort in the Azores. It is located in Angra do Heroísmo, on the island of Terceira.
