= Reducto da Salga =

Azores landmark

Coordinates: 38°38′44″N 27°05′40″W

Reducto da Salga is a landmark in the Azores. It is located in Angra do Heroísmo, on the island of Terceira.
