= Forte de São Fernando (Vila de São Sebastião) =

Coordinates: 38°40′33″N 27°03′53″W

Forte de São Fernando (Vila de São Sebastião) is a fort in the Azores. It is located in Angra do Heroísmo, on the island of Terceira.
