= Gruta das Cinco Ribeiras =

Gruta das Cinco Ribeiras Cave of Cinco Ribeiras
- Interactive map of Gruta das Cinco Ribeiras; Cave of Cinco Ribeiras
- Location: Terceira Island (Azores), Portugal
- Coordinates: 38°40.5′N 27°19.85′W
- Geology: Lava tube, Basalt
- Access: Maritime access by boat

The Gruta das Cinco Ribeiras (literally the Cave of Cinco Ribeiras) is a cave situated in the southwest coast of Terceira, located in the civil parish of Cinco Ribeiras, municipality of Angra do Heroísmo, in the Portuguese archipelago of the Azores.

The cave is situated along the coast near the Porto das Cinco Ribeiras and the surrounding bay, primarily accessible by boat from along the coast.

The geological formation is directly related with the former-volcano of Serra de Santa Bárbara, and is characterized by high areals, lava flows and pyroclasts that created perfect stratifications of geological materials. It is associated specifically with a lava tube and arches created during the eruptions of the Santa Bárbara volcano. The morphology of the location allowed the formation of subaquatic caves popular with divers. Although there are various depths associated with the site, its maximum depth extent is 16 metres (52 ft), resulting in several small galleries and interspersed by stone, cliffs and sandy shallows.
