= Forte de Santo António (Porto Judeu) =

Fort in the Azores

Coordinates: 38°38′49″N 27°07′12″W

Forte de Santo António (Porto Judeu) is a fort in the Azores. It is located in Angra do Heroísmo, on the island of Terceira. <
