= Prainha =

Prainha may refer to:

- Prainha (São Roque do Pico), a parish in the district of São Roque do Pico, Azores, Portugal
- Prainha, Pará, Pará state, Brazil
- Prainha, Praia, a subdivision of the city of Praia, Cape Verde
- Prainha (Angra do Heroísmo), a landmark in the Azores
