= Serra do Morião =

Mountain in the Azores, Portugal

Coordinates: 38°41′N 27°12′W

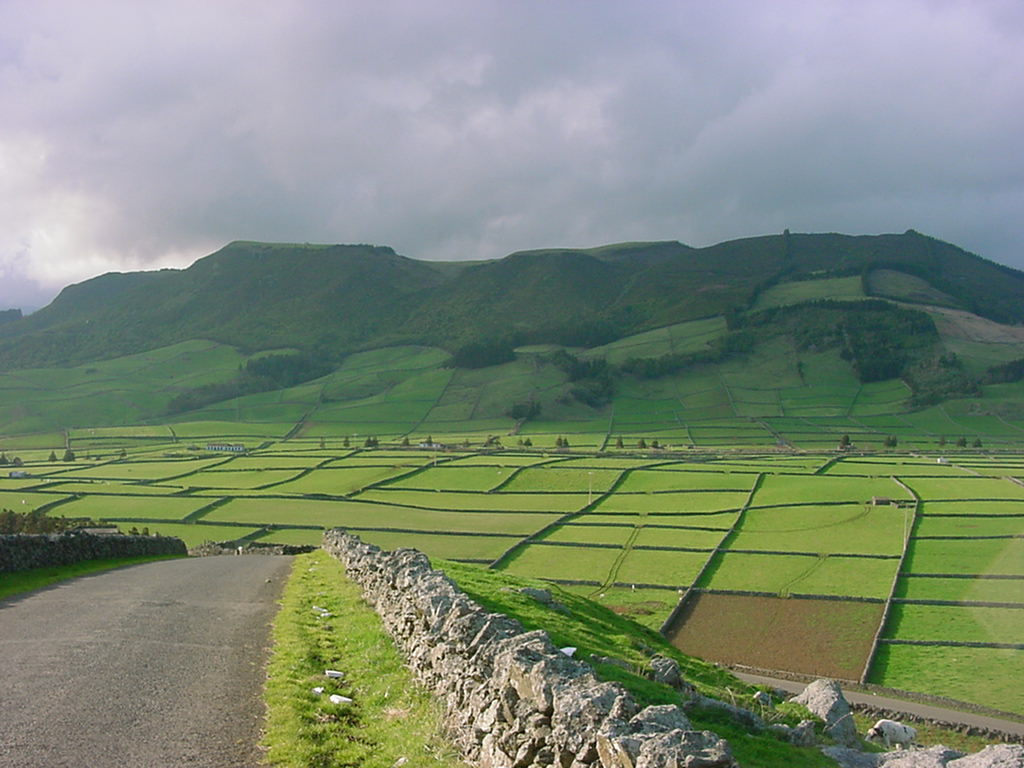

Serra do Morião, also known as Serra da Nasce Água, is a mountain in the Azores. It is located in Angra do Heroísmo, on the island of Terceira.

It is located at 632 meters above sea level. It contains what is possibly the island's largest reservoir, located in the crater of an ancient volcano.
