= Forte do Zimbreiro (Angra do Heroísmo) =

Fort in the Azores

Forte do Zimbreiro (Angra do Heroísmo) is a fort in the Azores. It is located in Angra do Heroísmo, on the island of Terceira.
