= Forte de São Francisco (Angra do Heroísmo) =

Coordinates: 38°40′18″N 27°04′19″W

Forte de São Francisco (Angra do Heroísmo) is a fort in the Azores. It is located in Angra do Heroísmo, on the island of Terceira.
