= Forte da Salga =

Coordinates: 38°38′51″N 27°05′46″W

Forte da Salga is a fort in the Azores. It is located in Angra do Heroísmo, on the island of Terceira.
