= Miradouro da Amoreira =

Monument in Angra do Heroísmo

Miradouro da Amoreira is a monument in the Azores. It is located in Angra do Heroísmo, on the island of Terceira.
