= Gruta dos Ratões =

Cave in South America

Gruta dos Ratões is a cave in the Azores. It is located in Angra do Heroísmo, on the island of Terceira.
