= Parque de Campismo das Cinco Ribeiras =

Park in the Azores

Parque de Campismo das Cinco Ribeiras is a park in the Azores. It is located in Angra do Heroísmo, on the island of Terceira.
