= Fort of Má Ferramenta =

- Forte da Má Ferramenta
- Terceira, Central, name=Azores in Portugal

Site information
- Type: Fort
- Owner: Portuguese Republic
- Operator: Junta de Freguesia de São Mateus da Calheta
- Open to the public: Public

Location
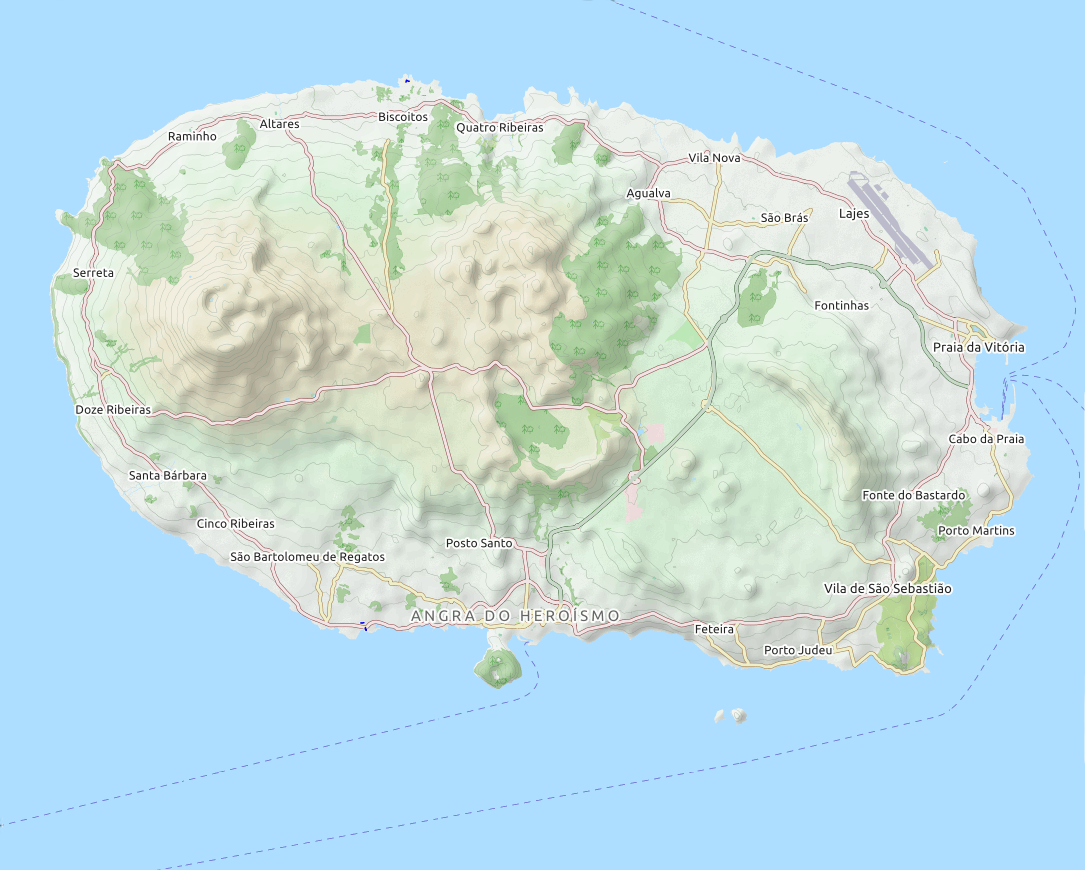
- Location of the fort within the municipality of Angra do Heroísmo
- Coordinates: 38°39′23″N 27°15′58″W

Site history
- Built: 16th century
- Materials: Basalt

The Fort of Má Ferramenta (Portuguese: Forte da Má Ferramenta), near the port of the civil parish of São Mateus da Calheta, municipality of Angra do Heroísmo, along the southern coast of the Portuguese island of Terceira, in the archipelago of the Azores. Located in a dominant position over this coastal stretch of coast that sheltered anchored ships, it was a fortification used as a defence against attacks from pirates and corsairs, that frequented the waters of the mid-Atlantic.

== History ==
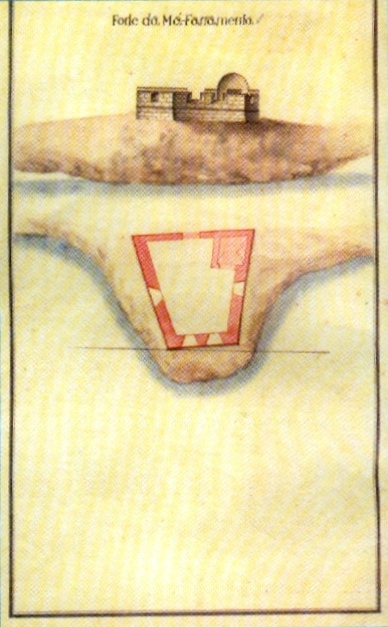
The rectangular Fort of Má Ferramenta as pictured by José Rodrigo de Almeida (1830)

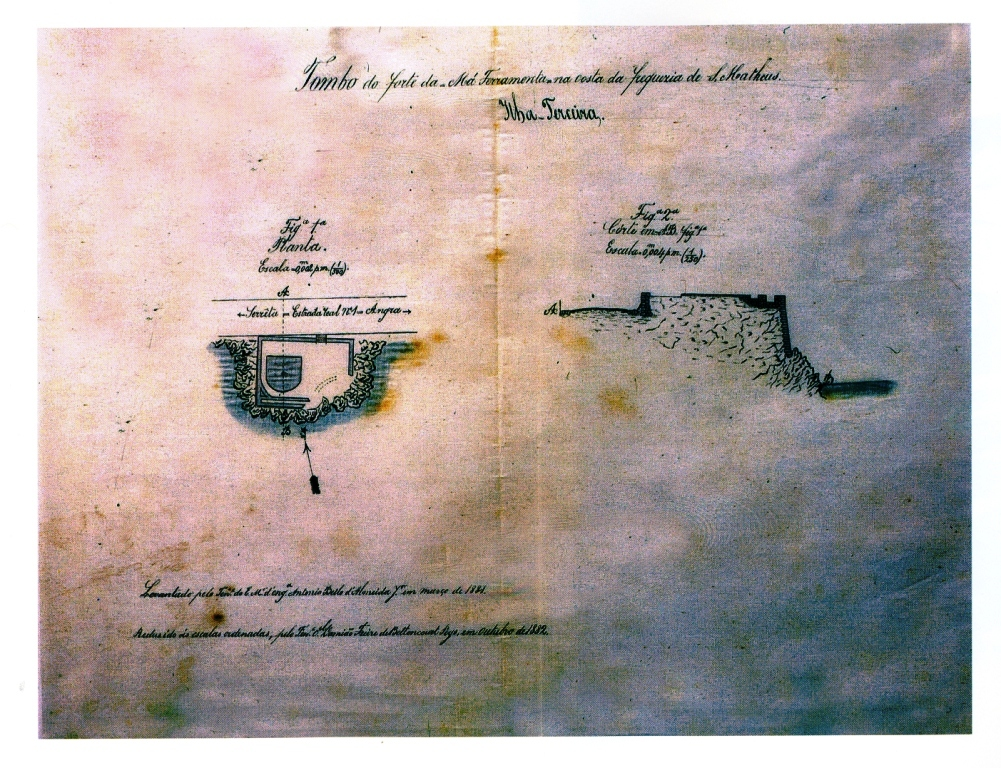
The plan of fortification by António Bello de Almeira Jr. and, later, Damião Pego (1881-1882)

It is unclear when the fort was erected, although its design indicates that it followed the plans of engineer Tommaso Benedetto, of the mid-16th century. Therefore, for these reasons, likely remotes the period of the Corregedor of the Azores, Ciprião de Figueiredo e Vasconcelos (around 1581), or later, immediately after the Portuguese Restoration War, in 1640.

With the installation of the Captaincy-General of the Azores, the fort was referred in the following terms (1767):

"Redoubt of Má Ferramenta. Needs a new gate, it has three canon emplacements, three iron canons able, with their good repair, need to stave three and twelve auxiliary gunners."

A similar report (Revista aos fortes que defendem a costa da ilha Terceira) by Manoel Correa Branco, writing in 1776, found repairs were necessary at the site:

"...at the guards' barracks, which should be done at appropriate place and the gates' emplacements, which should have been positioned towards the land."

During the Liberal Wars (1828-1834), the site continued to be of strategic importance for the Liberal forces of Queen Maria II, which was mapped-out in 1830 by José Rodrigo de Almeida, in his "Colecção de Plantas e Alçados de 32 Fortalezas dos Açores"(Collection of Plans and Elevations of the 32 Fortresses of the Azores) found in the Gabinete de Estudos de Arquitetura e Engenharia Militar (Cabinet for Architectural Studies and Military Engineering) in Lisbon.

A report by Field Marshal Barão de Bastos in 1862, found that the fort "...is in a good state, but requires that its emplacements towards the sea should be raised to a greater height." He observed:

"Its only a barbette, where one finds placed a single 24-calibre piece and deserves to be conserved because this area of two miles to the point of São Diogo do Castello de São João Baptista, crosses effectively its fire with the said point, defending also the light's point and that of Silveira."

During the period of the 1880s, around 1883, the Portuguese army was seeking the possibility of collecting stoneworks in many of the forts, since the abandoned forts were being used in the construction of local residences.

Around 1939, there were moves to transfer the property from the Army to the Ministry of Finances, yet, by the beginning the Second World War, it was reoccupied: what little remained of this period was a few elements in cement, that by the end of the 21st century had, along with the structure, fallen into ruin.

== Architecture ==
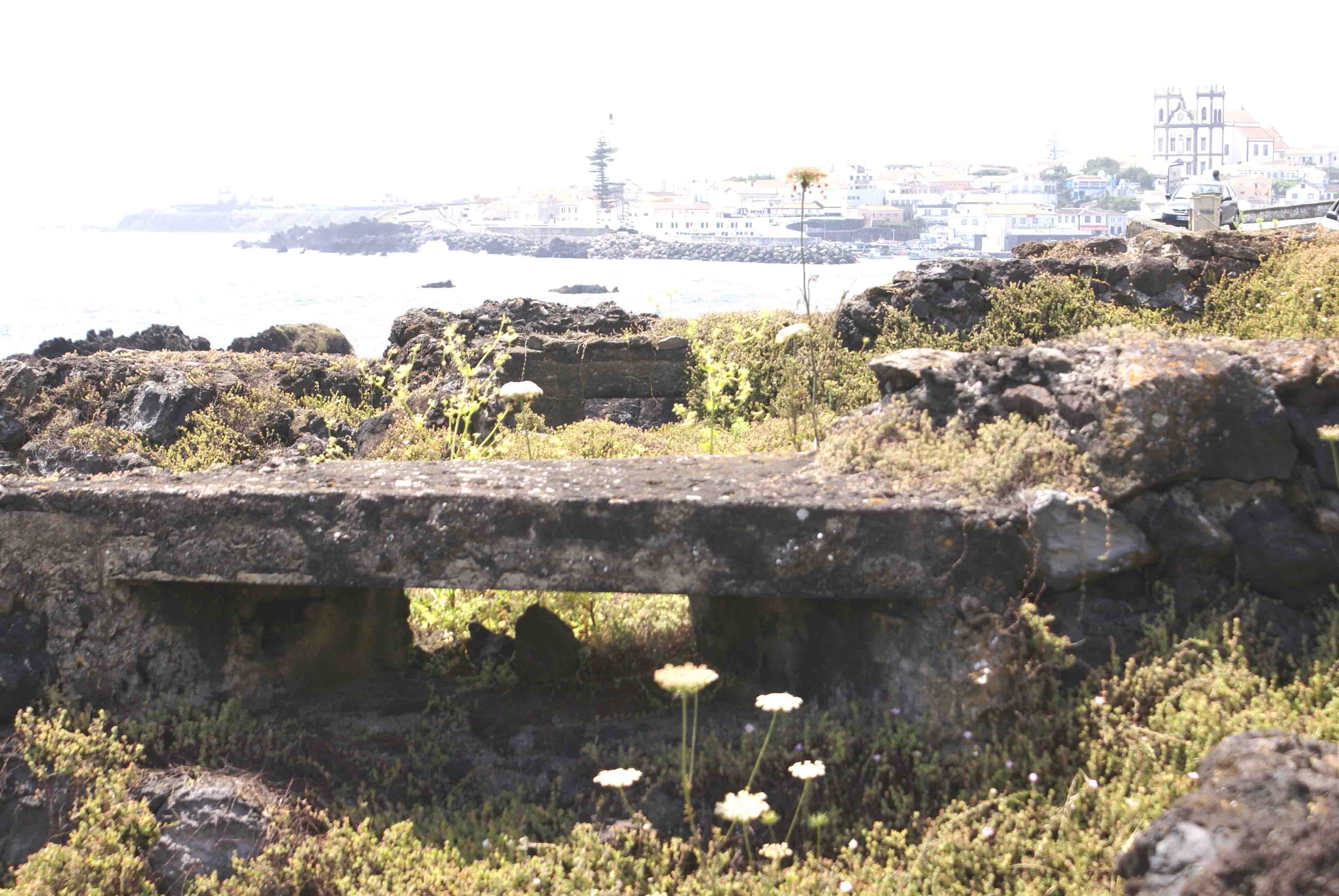
The remains of the eastern walls of the Forte da Má Ferramenta

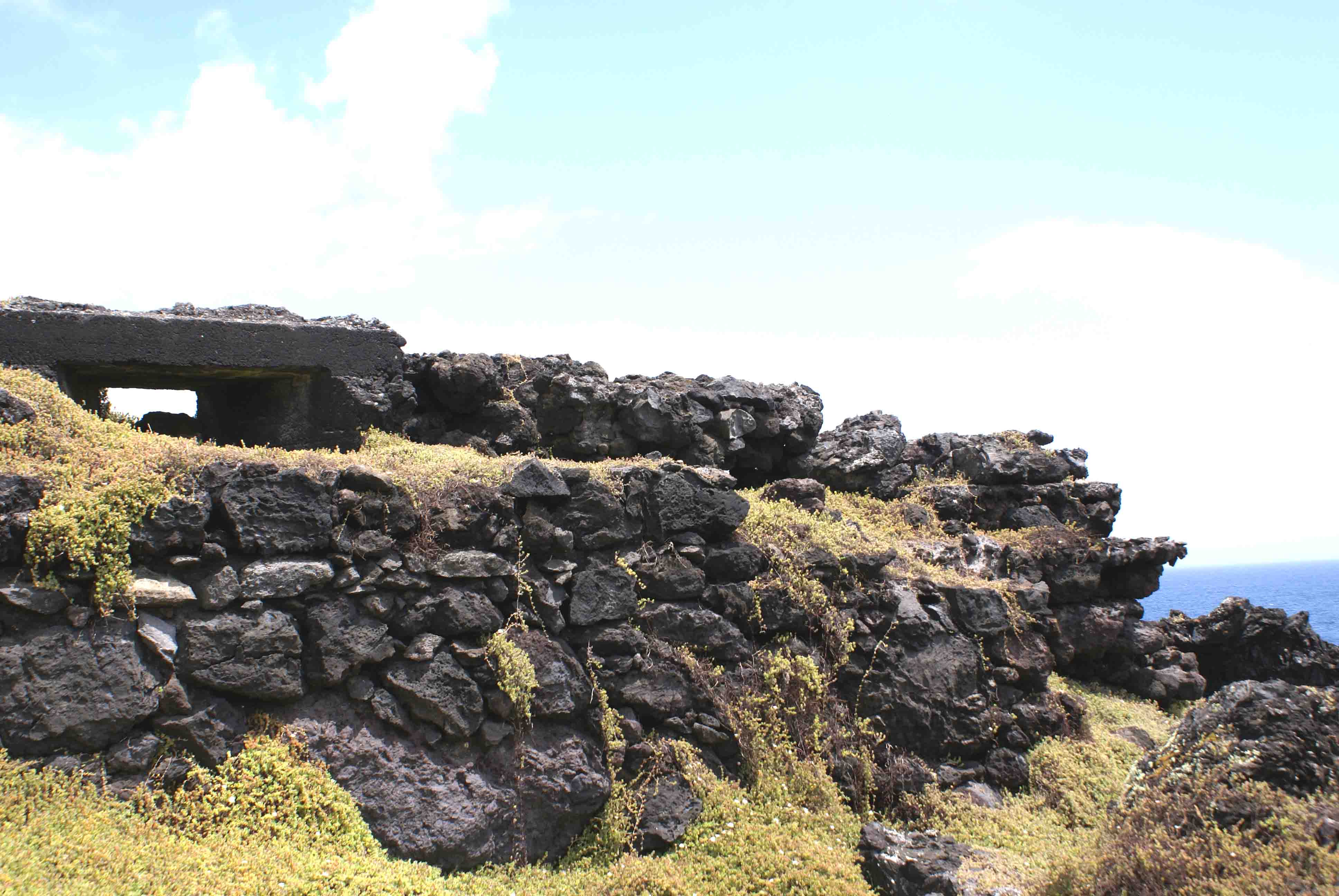
Ruins of a portion of the western walls of the fortifications

The remains of the old fort are situated in an area called Bravio, lying near the port of São Mateus da Calheta, in the municipality of Angra do Heroísmo, an area of southern Terceira located between the remains of the Fortress of São Mateus da Calheta and mouth of the bay.

The fort was accessed by a staircase that began at the edge of the Royal Road 1 and included an area occupied of little more than an area of approximately 280 square metres (3,000 ft^{2}). Historically a wall oriented towards the south and east were the primary fortifications, and probably extended around a rectangular area. There are some investigators that suggest that the walls were not rectangular, but rather curvilinear and encircled the early fort.

A bastion-type fortification, its plan evolved from the characteristic 15th century model, consisting of a trapezoidal layout with four canon emplacements and vaulted-ceiling magazine. It later evolved to support a heavy-caliber canon/artillery piece along the barbette, with exterior walls at the level of the embankment (that existing by 1881).
