= Fort of the Maré =

Ruined 16th-century Portuguese fort

- Forte da Maré
- Terceira, Central, name=Azores in Portugal

Site information
- Type: Fort
- Owner: Portuguese Republic
- Operator: Junta de Freguesia da São Mateus da Calheta
- Open to the public: Public

Location
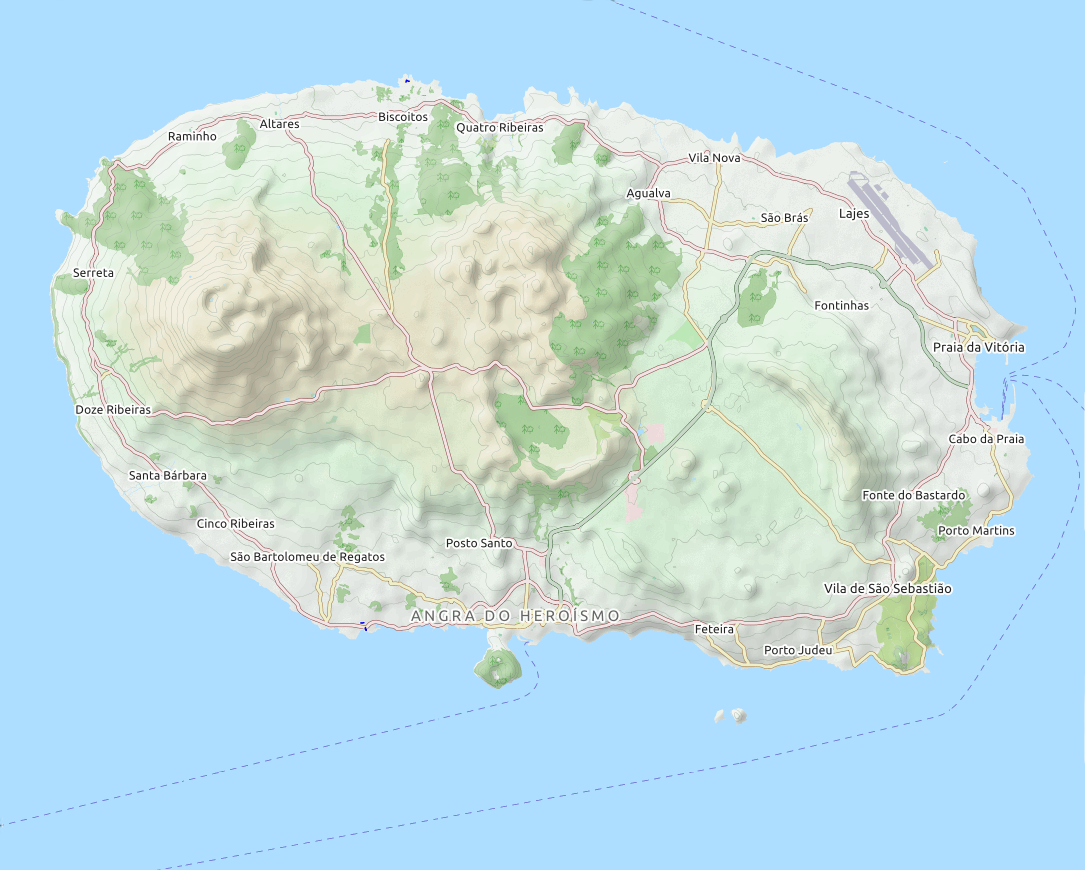
- Location of the fort within the municipality of Angra do Heroísmo
- Coordinates: 38°43′52.97″N 27°3′1.25″W

Site history
- Built: 16th century
- Materials: Basalt

The Fort of the Maré (Portuguese: Forte da Maré), ruins of a 16th-century fortification located in the civil parish São Mateus da Calheta, in the municipality of Angra do Heroísmo, along the southern coast of Terceira, Portuguese archipelago of the Azores.

== History ==
The fort was constructed to protect from pirates and attacks by Spain during the Portuguese Restoration War.
