= Fort of the Açougue =

16th-century fortification in the Azores

- Forte do Açougue
- Terceira, Central, name=Azores in Portugal

Site information
- Type: Fort
- Owner: Portuguese Republic
- Open to the public: Public

Location
- Location of the fort within the municipality of Angra do Heroísmo

Site history
- Built: 16th century
- Materials: Basalt

The Fort of the Açougue (Portuguese: Forte do Açougue), ruins of a 16th-century fortification located in the municipality of Angra do Heroísmo, along the southern coast of Terceira, Portuguese archipelago of the Azores.

== History ==
Its construction remotes from the Portuguese succession crisis of 1580, sometime between 1579 and 1581, when attacks by pirates in the mid-Atlantic threatened the safety and security of New World treasure ships. The Corregedor of the Azores, Ciprião de Figueiredo e Vasconcelos initiated the construction of several forts that ringed the coasts of Terceira, using the plans of Italian military engineer Tommaso Benedetto as its basis.

The chronicler Gaspar Frutuoso referred to this fortification in the explanations in his Saudades da Terra, sometime in the 16th century:

"At the fort called Açougue: [there are] Two pieces of strained iron, of 10 quintais and 30 arráteis; another piece of iron of 9 quintais [900 kilograms (2,000 lb)] and 20 arráteis [13.77 kilograms (30.4 lb)]; two of bronze of 140 arráteis [64.26 kilograms (141.7 lb)], with crowns and crescent moons; 115 projectile of lead with lead bullets pear the grinders, ten...projectiles, twelve alcanzias [hand-thrown grenades]."

== Architecture ==
By the end of the 20th century there little more than ruins of this fortification, nor the remains of its foundations.
