= Serra da Ribeirinha =

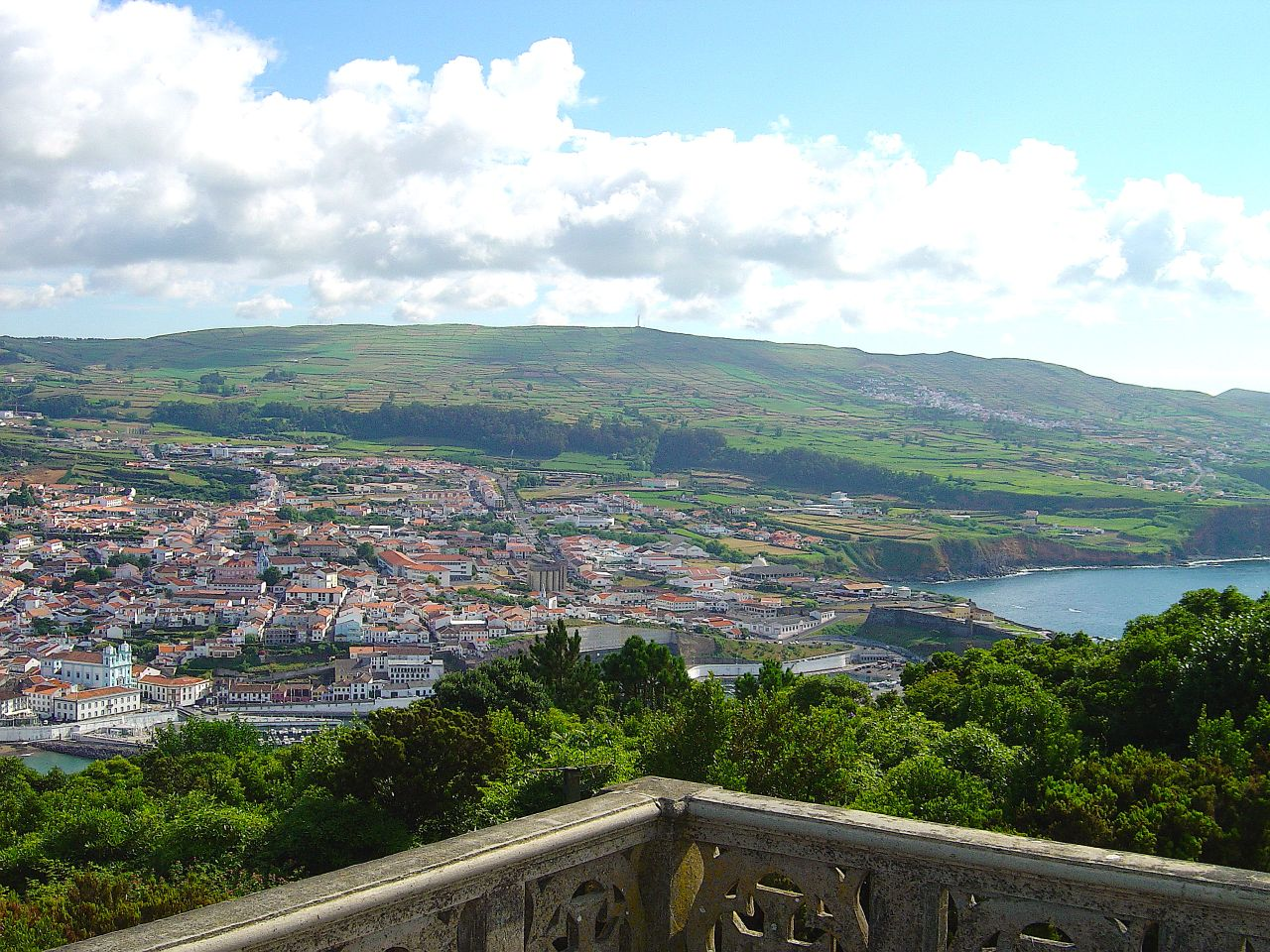
View of Serra da Ribeirinha from Monte Brasil

Serra da Ribeirinha is a mountain in the Azores. It is located in Angra do Heroísmo, on the island of Terceira.
