= Zona Balnear do Negrito =

Zone in the Azores, Portugal

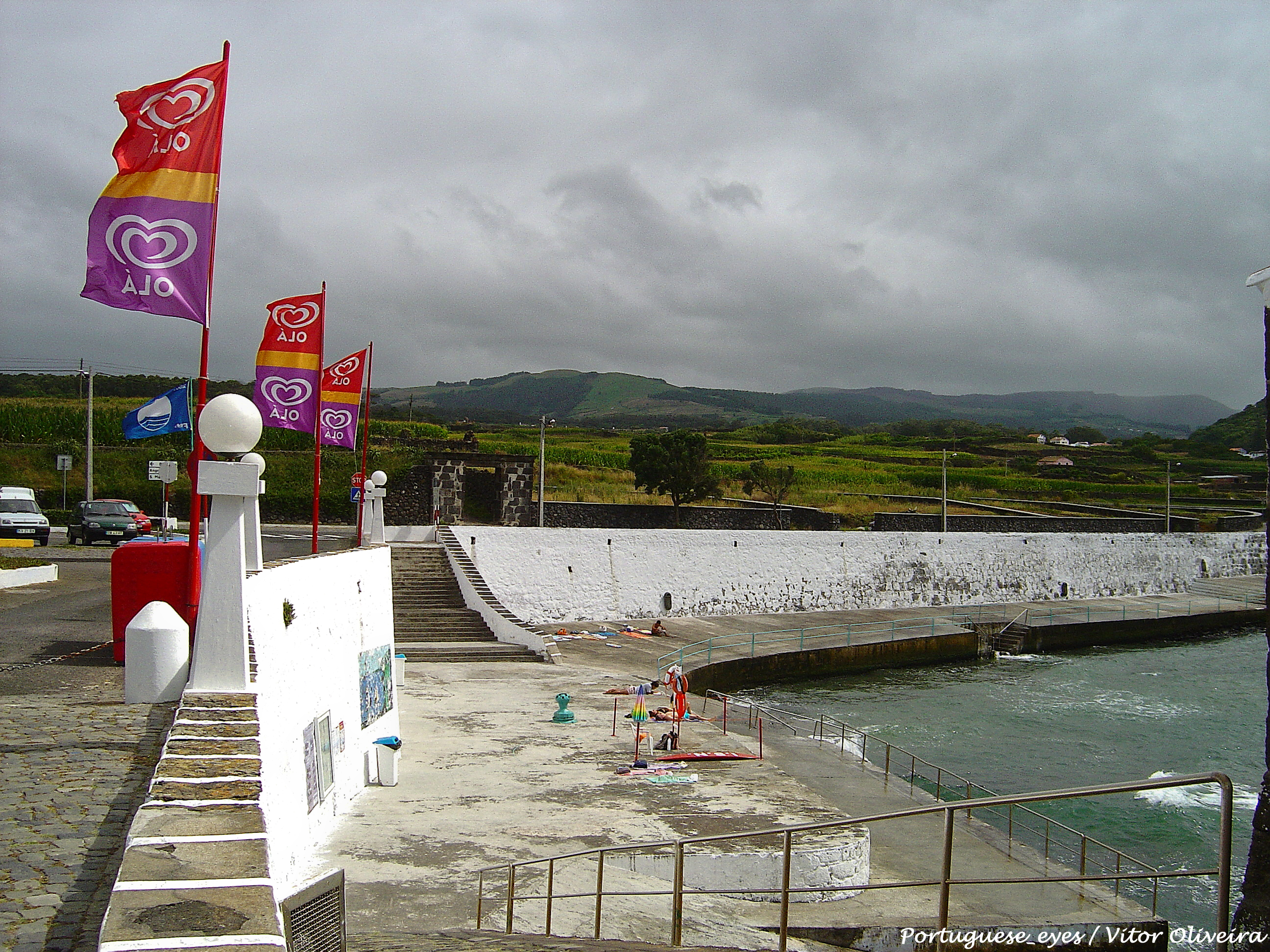
- Zona Balnear do Negrito
- Location: São Mateus da Calheta, Angra do Heroísmo, Terceira Island, Azores, Portugal
- Offshore water bodies: Atlantic Ocean

Zona Balnear do Negrito is a zone located in the parish of São Mateus da Calheta, in the municipality of Angra do Heroísmo, on Terceira Island, Azores.
