= Gruta do Zé Grande =

Cave in the Azores, Portugal

The Gruta do Zé Grande is a cave located in Serretinha, situated in the civil parish of Feteira, municipality of Angra do Heroísmo, in the Portuguese archipelago of the Azores. It is a lava tube created from the lava flows that extended to the coast, 60 metres (200 ft) long, 3.8 metres (12 ft) wide and 2.1 metres (6.9 ft) tall.
