= São Bento (Angra do Heroísmo) =

- Civil parish
- Location in the Azores São Bento (Terceira)
- Coordinates: 38°39′35″N 27°12′23″W
- Country: Portugal
- Auton. region: Azores
- Island: Terceira
- Municipality: Angra do Heroísmo
- Established: Settlement: fl. 1500; Parish: c. 1572

Area
  - Total: 10.34 km^{2} (3.99 sq mi)
- Elevation: 65 m (213 ft)

Population (2011)
  - Total: 2,000
  - Density: 190/km^{2} (500/sq mi)
- Time zone: UTC−01:00 (AZOT)
  - Summer (DST): UTC+00:00 (AZOST)
- Postal code: 9700-213
- Area code: 292
- Patron: São Bento
- Website: www.jfsaobento.com

São Bento is a parish in the municipality of Angra do Heroísmo on the island of Terceira in the Azores. The population in 2011 was 2,000, in an area of 10.34 km^{2} (3.99 sq mi). The parish lies at an elevation of 65 metres above sea level. It contains the localities Caboucos, Canada da Fontinha, Canada do Vale, Carreirinha, Escopins, São Luís and Vale de Linhares.
