= Maria Teodora Pimentel =

First female doctor in the Azores, Portugal

- Born: 11 September 1865; Angra do Heroísmo, Azores, Portugal
- Died: 16 November 1948 (aged 83); Angra do heroísmo
- Resting place: Angra do Heroísmo
- Occupation: Physician (doctor)
- Known for: First female doctor from the Azores

Maria Teodora Pimentel (1865-1948) was the first woman from the Portuguese island group of the Azores to become a medical doctor.

== Early life ==
Maria Teodora Pimentel was born on 11 September 1865 in Angra do Heroísmo, on Terceira Island in the Azores. The daughter of an army sergeant, Manuel Quaresma Pimentel, who died when she was young, she obtained a teaching diploma at the beginning of 1884 that qualified her to teach at primary and secondary levels, so allowing her to support herself and her mother and continue her studies. She entered the Polytechnic School of Lisbon in 1887 to take the course that was a requirement to study at Lisbon's Medical-Surgical School (Escola Médico-Cirúrgica de Lisboa), which would later become the medical faculty of the University of Lisbon. In 1895 she obtained a degree in Medicine from the Medical-Surgical School.

== Working life ==
Failing to get a position at the University of Lisbon, Pimentel returned to the Azores where she became known as the "doctor of the poor". She also became the first woman to occupy a public administration position in the Azores.

In her will, Pimentel left her residence to be used as a Municipal Hostel. This was called the Albergaria Cruzeiro, and it opened in 1973, being later converted to a hotel.
