= Miradouro do Pico das Cruzinhas =

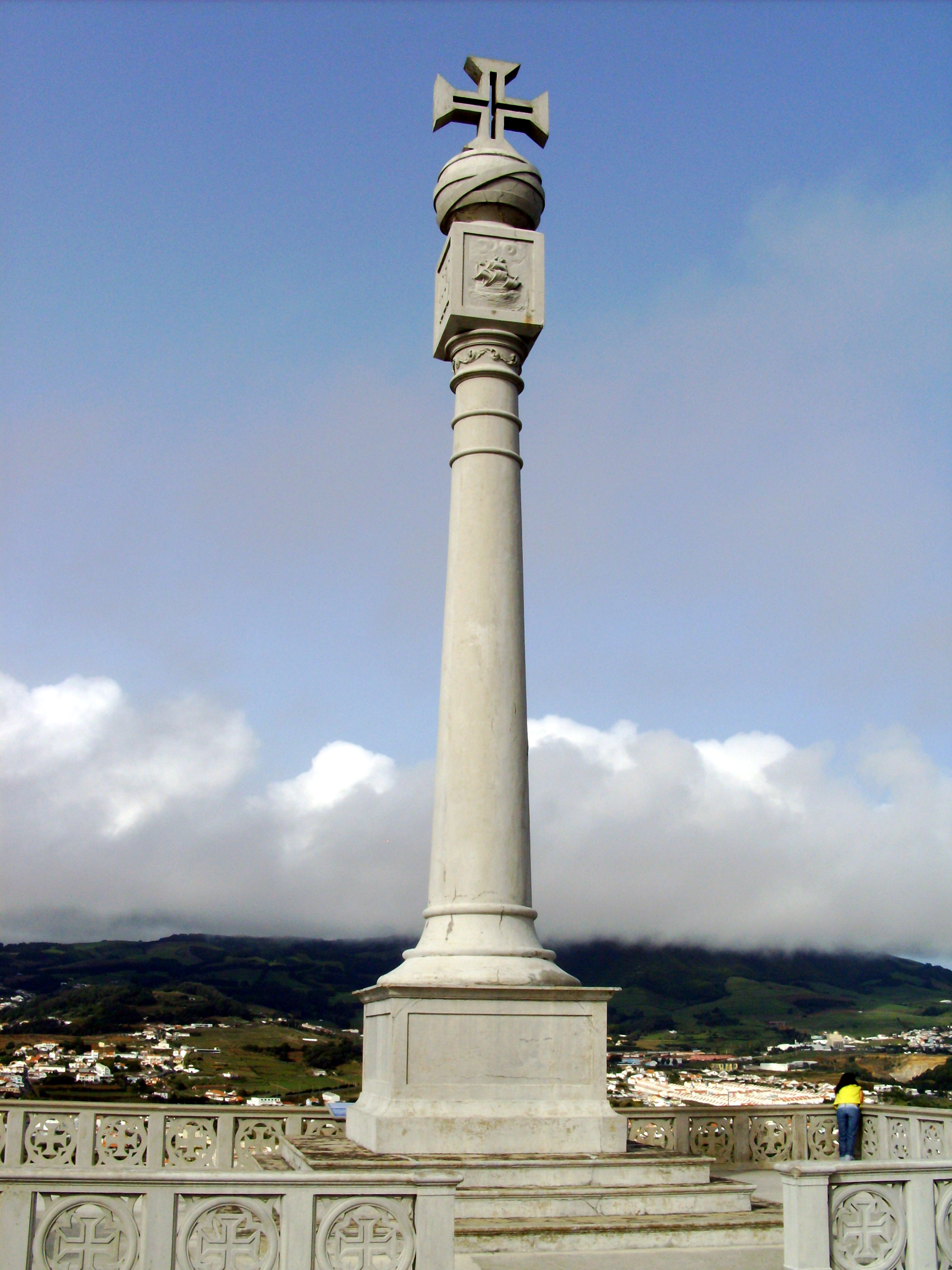
Pico das cruzinhas

Miradouro do Pico das Cruzinhas is a monument in the Azores. It is located in Angra do Heroísmo, on the island of Terceira.
