= Mata da Serreta =

Landmark in the Azores

Mata da Serreta is a landmark in the Azores. It is located in Angra do Heroísmo, on the island of Terceira.
