= Pico Matias Simão =

Monument in the Azores

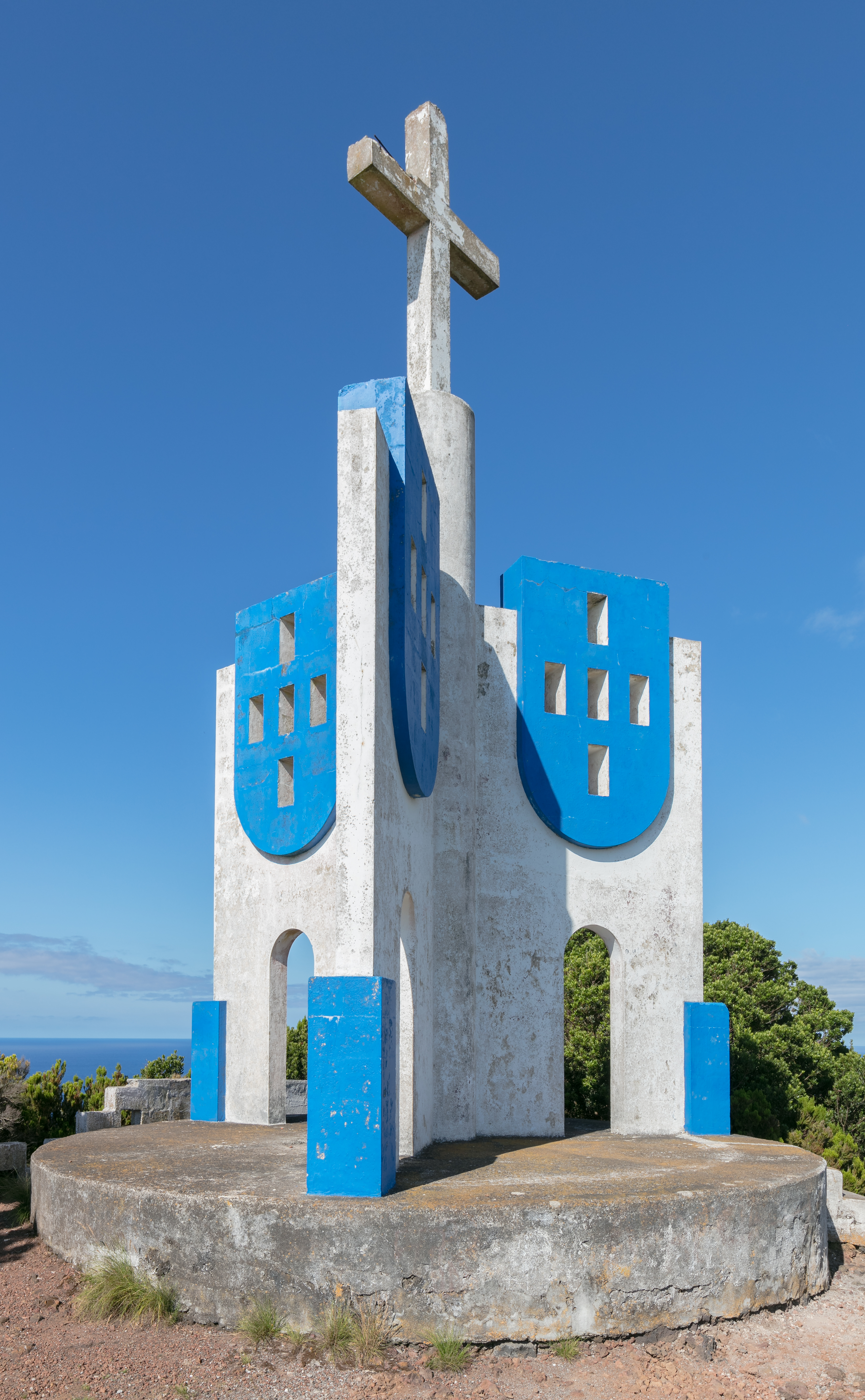
wayside cross

Miradouro do Pico Matias Simão is a monument in the Azores. It is located in Angra do Heroísmo, on the island of Terceira.
