= Miradouro da Ponta do Queimado =

Miradouro da Ponta do Queimado is a monument in the Azores. It is located in Angra do Heroísmo, on the island of Terceira.
