= Porto das Cinco Ribeiras =

Landmark in the Azores

Porto das Cinco Ribeiras is a landmark in the Azores. It is located in Angra do Heroísmo, on the island of Terceira.
