= Prainha (Angra do Heroísmo) =

Prainha (Angra do Heroísmo) is a landmark in the Azores. It is located in the historical center of Angra do Heroísmo, on the island of Terceira.

Prainha is the sandy bathing area on the bay of Angra do Heroísmo, located close to the historic centre of the city. Ideal for families with children, this beach, bathed in calm, warm sea waters, has reliable infrastructure and excellent conditions for windsurfing.

Likely the only sandy beach in Angra Bay, it was used for centuries for maintaining and repairing ships arriving from overseas, often carrying spices, gold, and silver. This ancient illustration show Angra´s harbor with multiple ships anchored.

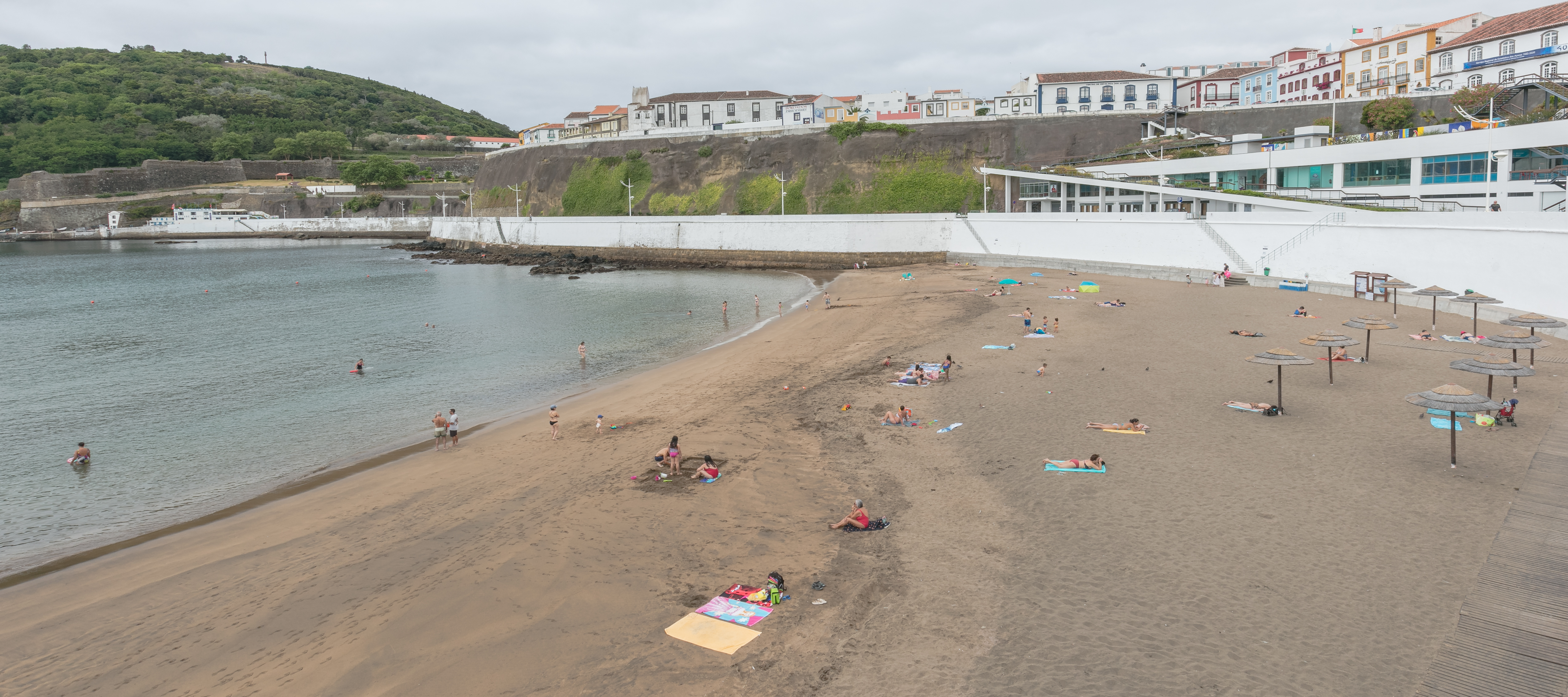
Beach of Angra do Heroísmo
