= Ponta do Queimado =

Ponta do Queimado is a headland on the island of Terceira in the Azores. Ponta do Queimado marks the westernmost point of the island.

The headland and surrounding area includes a lighthouse, a pool suitable for bathing, coves, and a viewpoint for seeing whales.
