= Angra do Heroísmo =

Angra do Heroísmo Angra
- Municipality
- Very Noble, Loyal and Ever Steadfast City of Angra do Heroísmo
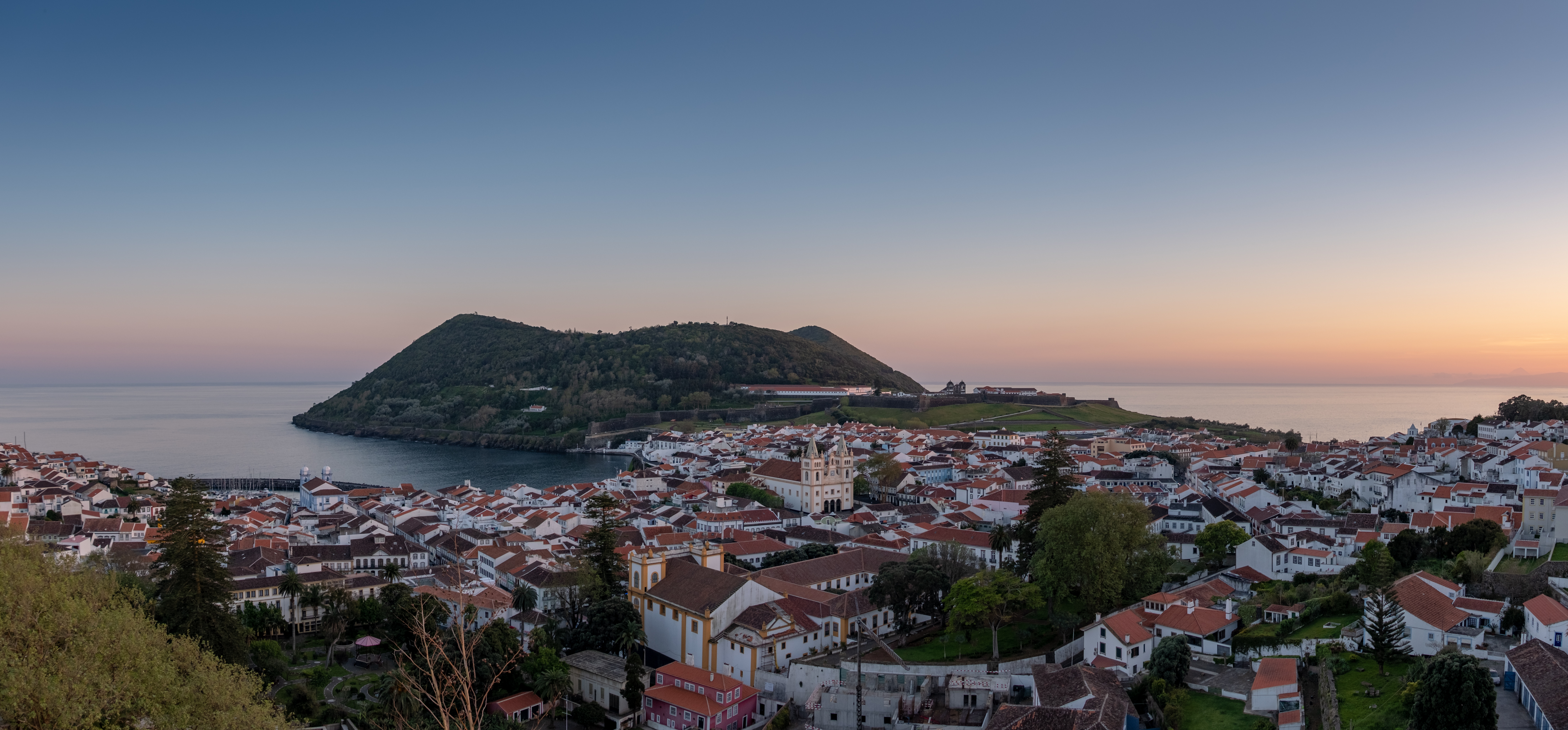
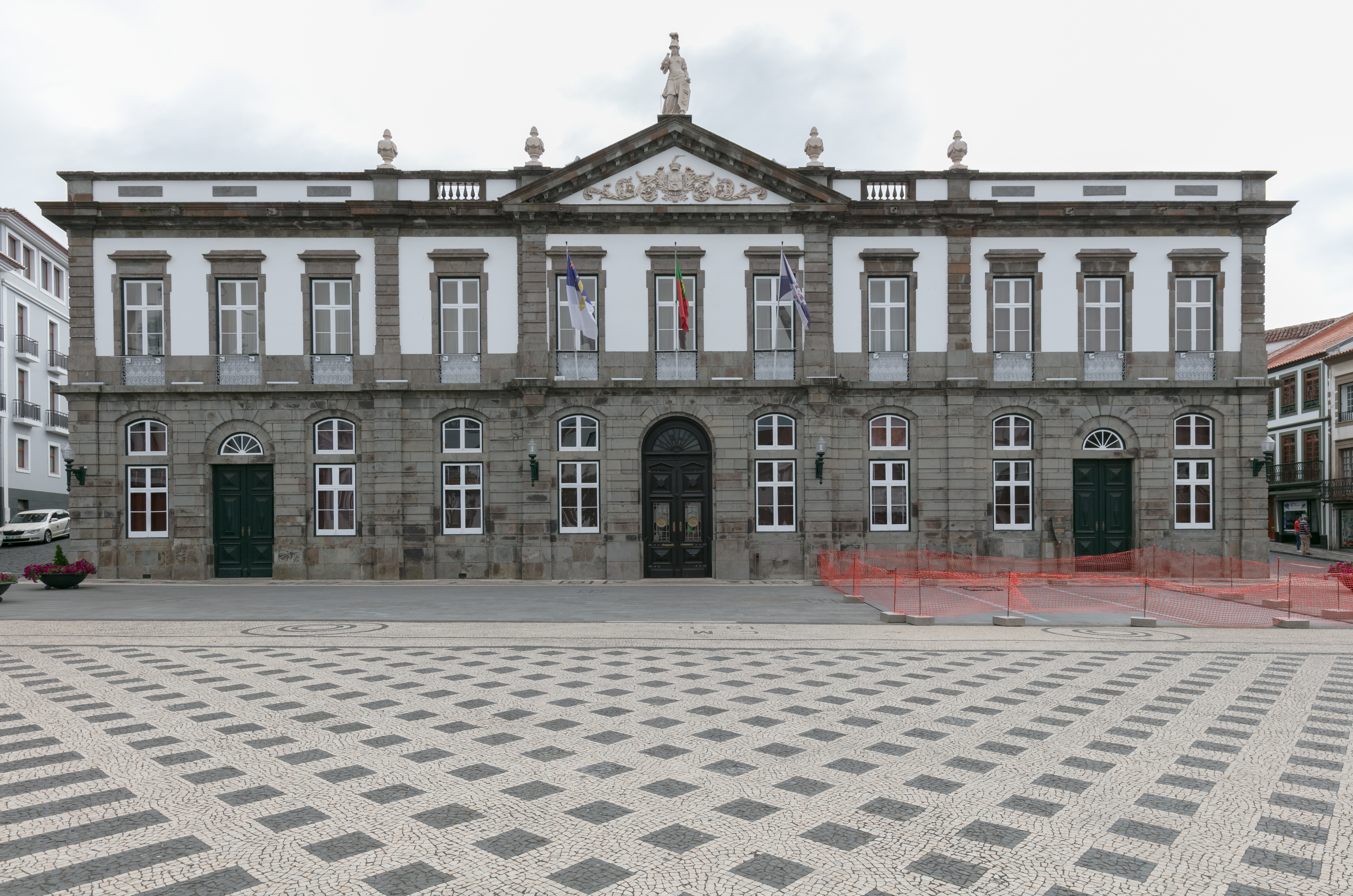
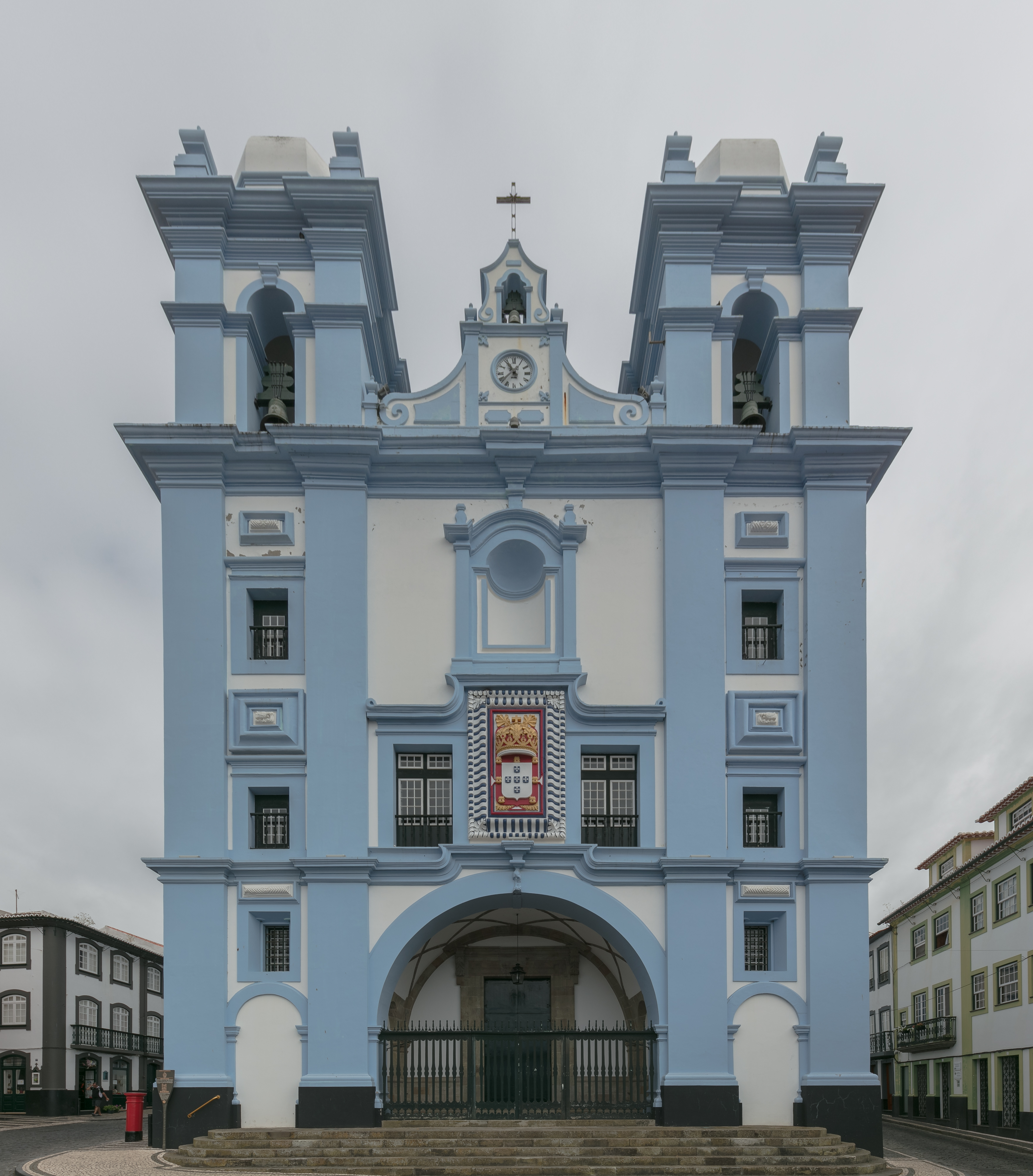
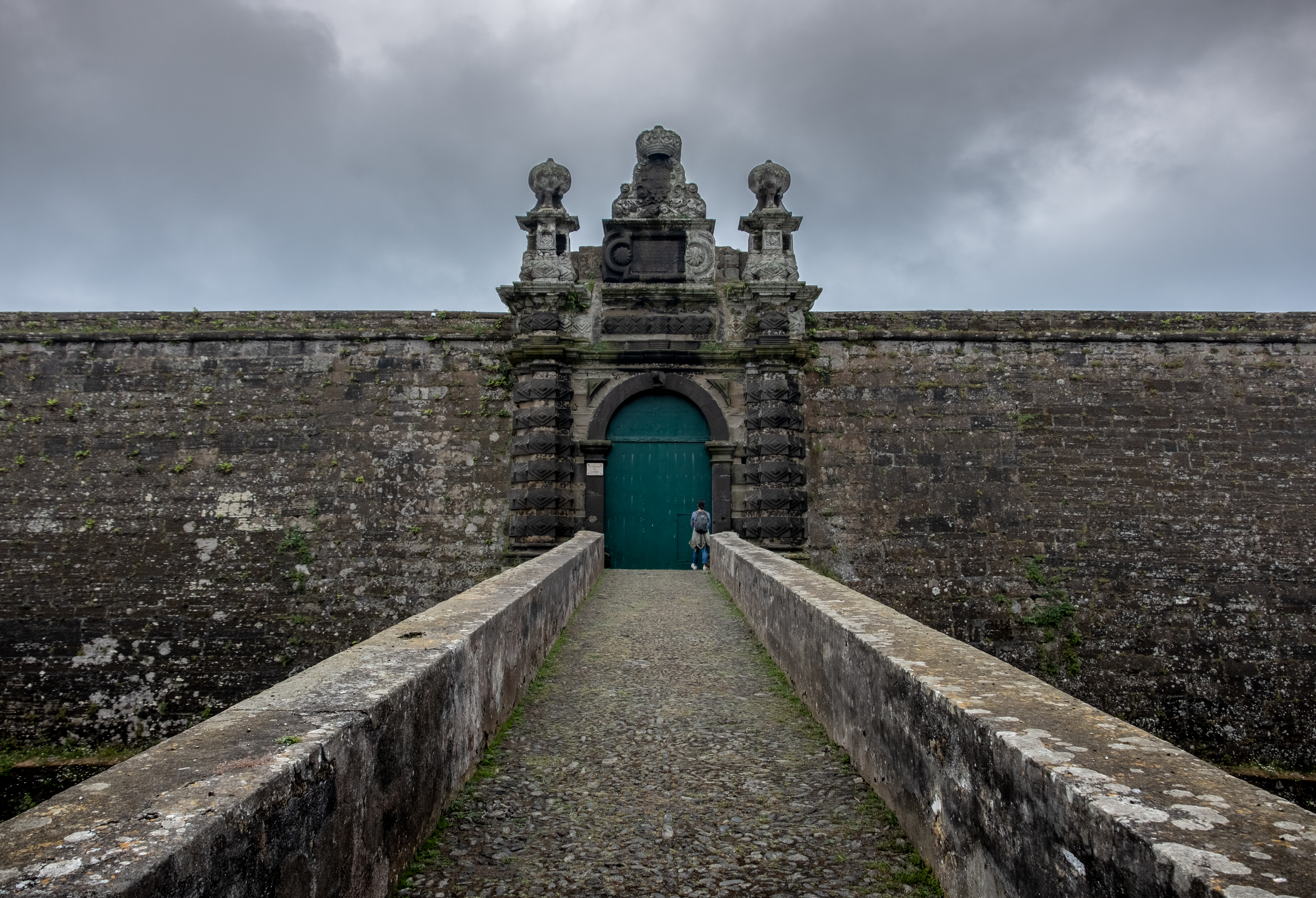
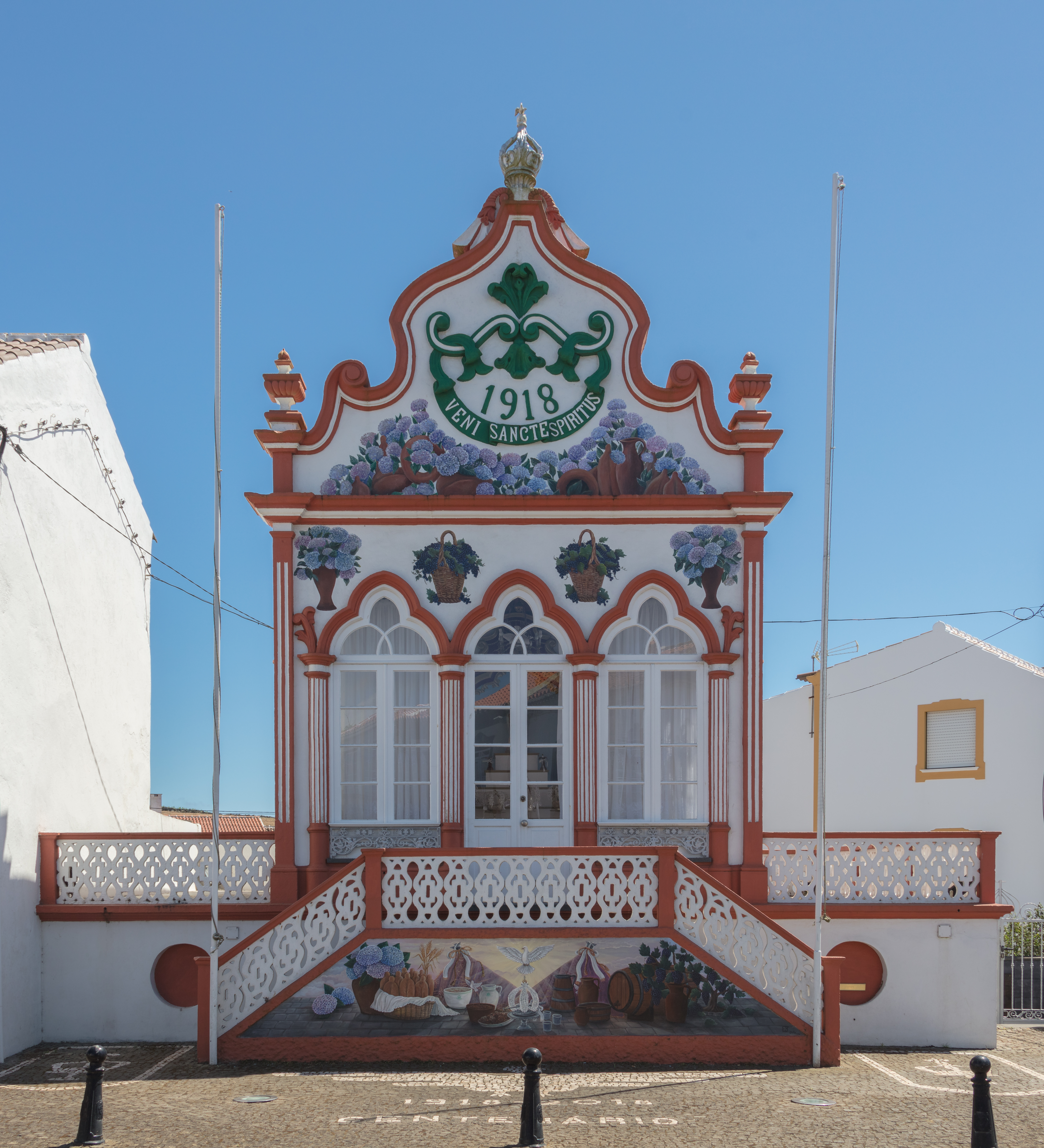
- Panorama of Angra do Heroísmo City Hall Igreja da Misericórdia Fortress of São João Baptista Império of the Cult of the Holy Spirit

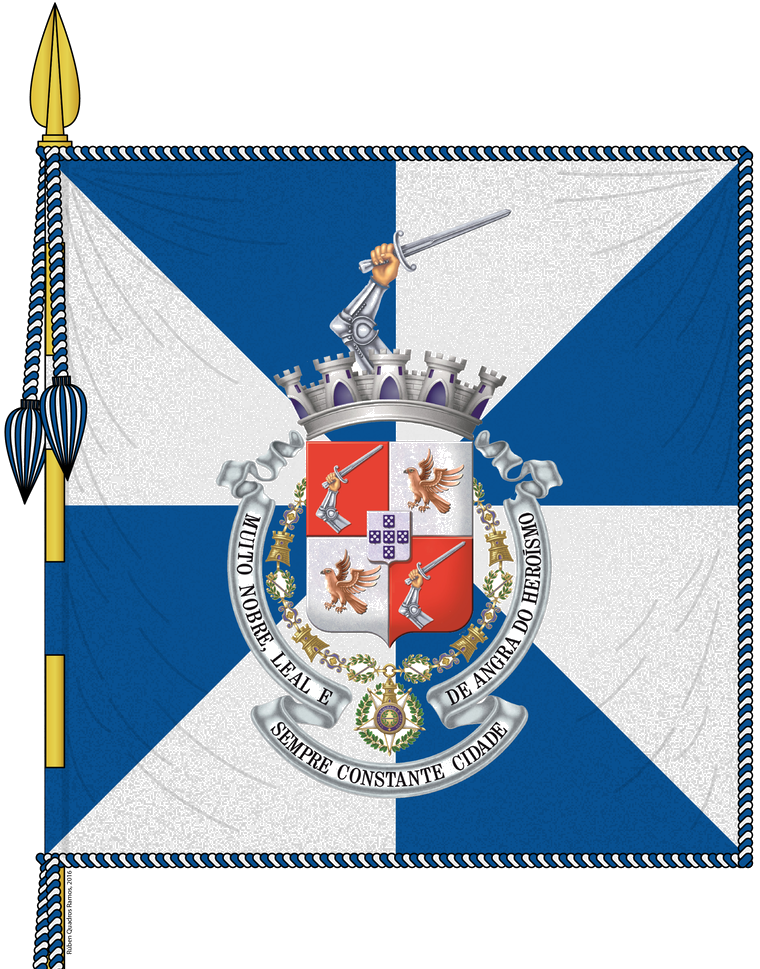
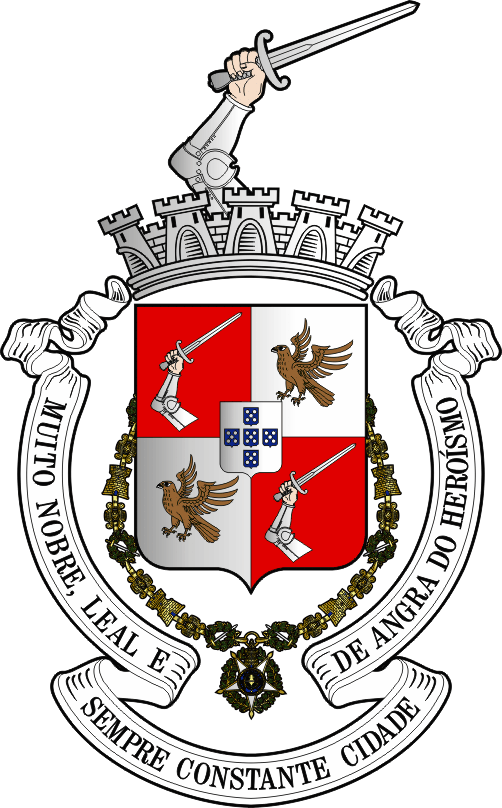
- Flag Coat of arms
- Interactive map of Angra do Heroísmo
- Location in the Azores Angra do Heroísmo (Terceira)
- Coordinates: 38°39′20″N 27°13′10″W
- Country: Portugal
- Auton. region: Azores
- Island: Terceira
- Established: Municipality: c. 1478
- Parishes: 19

Government
  - President: José Gabriel do Álamo de Meneses

Area
  - Total: 239.00 km^{2} (92.28 sq mi)
- Elevation: 31 m (102 ft)

Population (2011)
  - Total: 35,402
  - Density: 148.13/km^{2} (383.64/sq mi)
- Time zone: UTC−01:00 (AZOT)
  - Summer (DST): UTC+00:00 (AZOST)
- Postal code: 9701-101
- Area code: 292
- Patron: São João
- Local holiday: 24 June

UNESCO World Heritage Site
- Official name: Central Zone of the Town of Angra do Heroismo in the Azores
- Criteria: Cultural: iv,vi
- Reference: 206
- Inscription: 1983 (7th Session)

Angra do Heroísmo, (Note: Portuguese pronunciation: [ˈɐ̃ɡɾɐ ðu eɾuˈiʒmu]) officially the Very Noble, Loyal and Ever Steadfast City of Angra do Heroísmo, or simply Angra, is a city and municipality on Terceira Island, Portugal, and one of the three capital cities of the Azores. Founded in 1478, Angra was historically the most important city in the Azores, as seat of the Bishop of the Azores, government entities, and having previously served as the capital city of Portugal during the Liberal Wars. The population in 2011 was 35,402, in an area of 239.00 km^{2}. It was classified as a World Heritage Site by UNESCO in 1983.

== Name ==
Angra is the Portuguese word for "inlet", "cove", or "bay". The epithet do Heroísmo ("of Heroism", "the Heroic") was granted to the city by Maria II to commemorate its citizens' successful defense of the island against a Miguelist assault in 1829. The full name of the city is the Very Noble, Loyal and Ever Steadfast City of Angra do Heroísmo (Portuguese: Muito nobre, leal e sempre constante cidade de Angra do Heroísmo).

== History ==
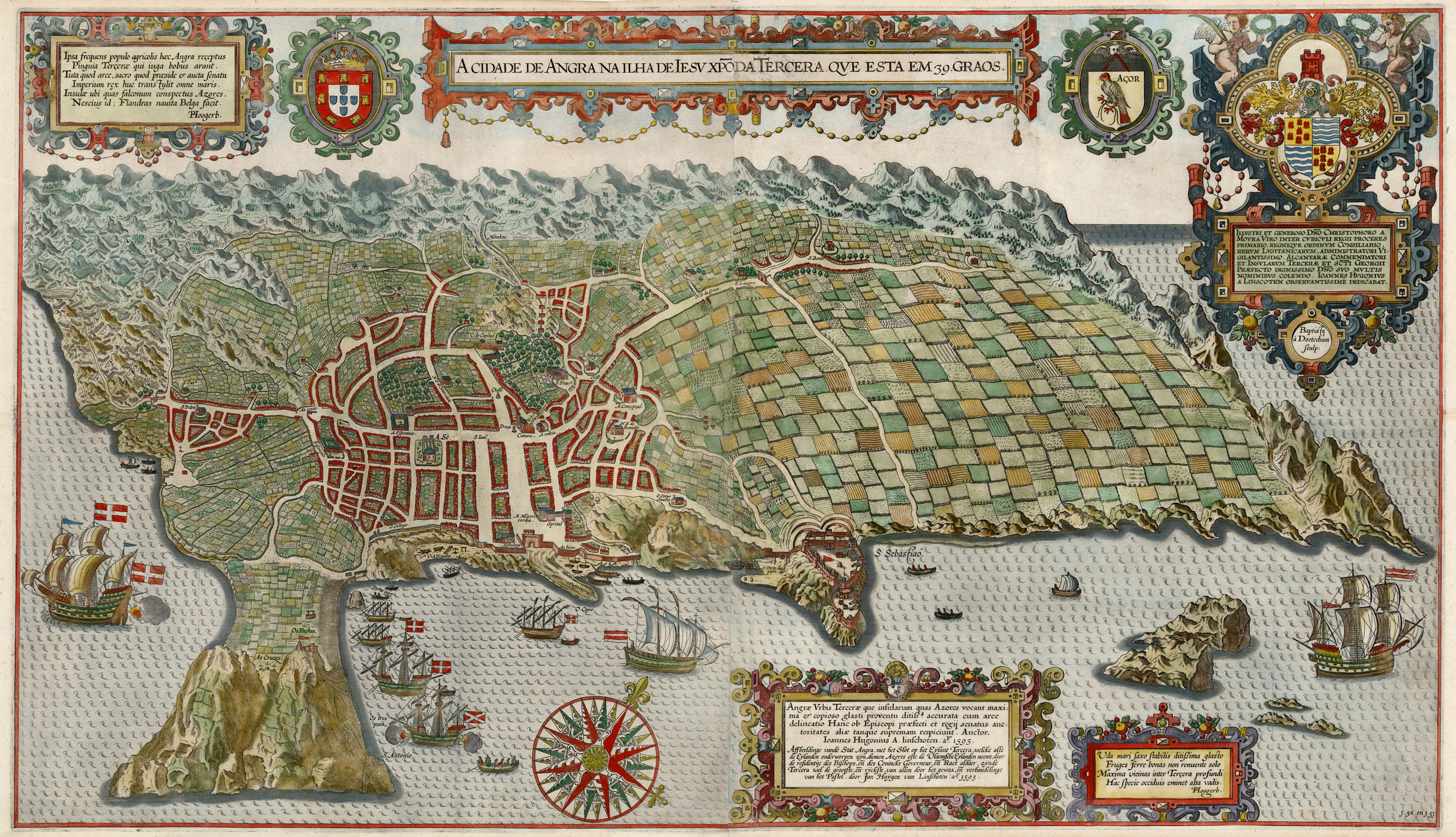
1595 Engraving by Jan Huygen van Linschoten, showing the extensive cultivated lands of the Achada Plain and the nucleus of the village of Angra

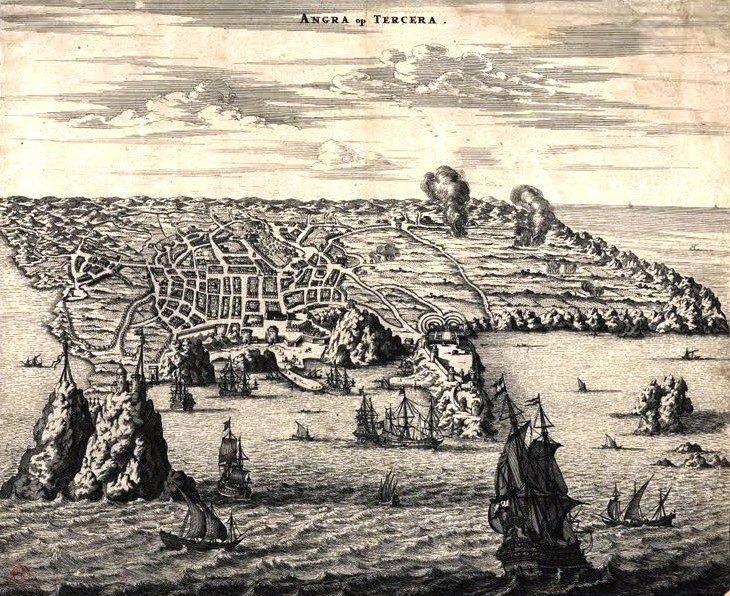
Angra do Heroísmo as seen in 1671

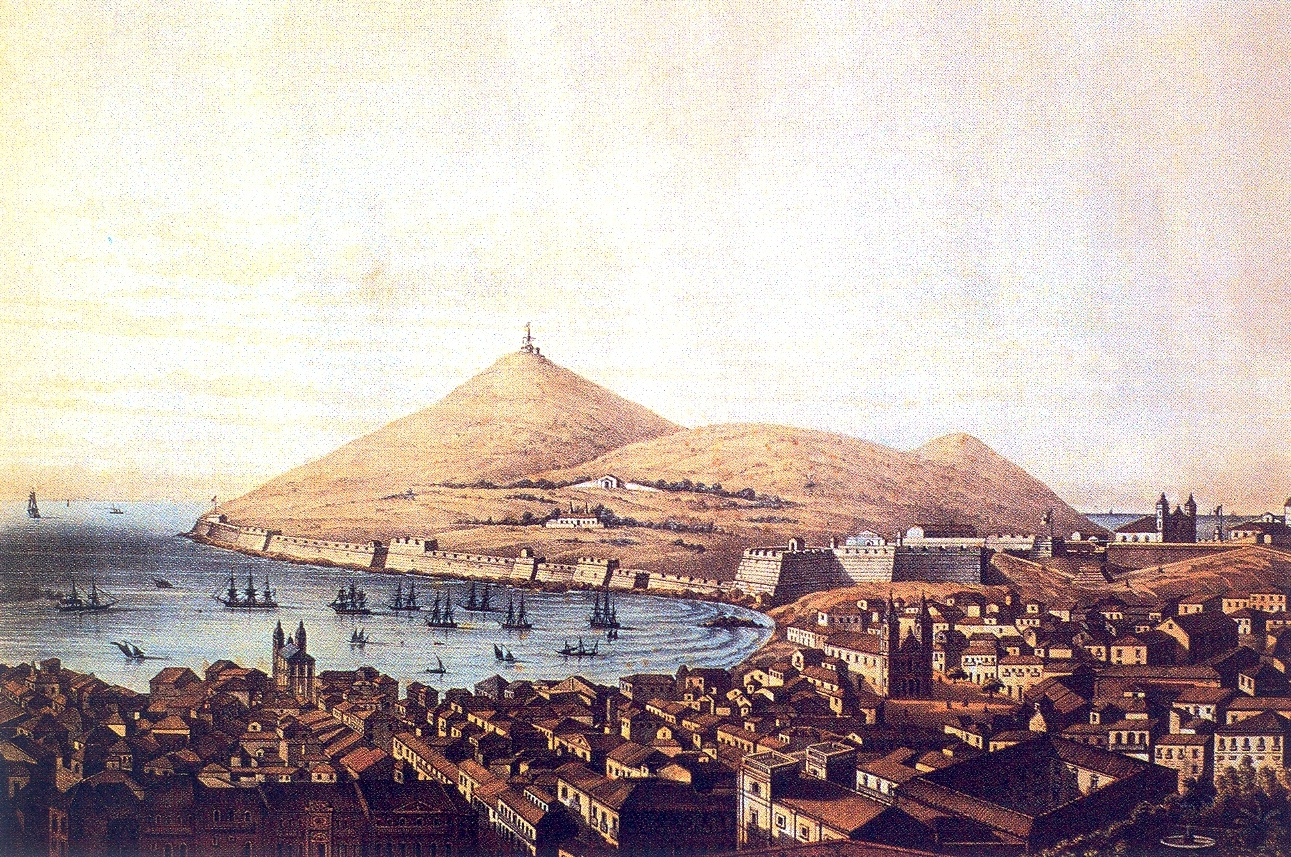
An engraving of Angra showing the Fort of São João Baptista

Some claim that Angra was founded by Álvaro Martins, who sailed with Didrik Pining on his expedition to the New World, and with Bartolomeu Dias on his voyage around the Cape of Good Hope. Others contend that Angra was founded in 1450 or 1451 by Jácome de Bruges, a Fleming in the service of Prince Henry the Navigator, who recruited farmers, fishermen, and merchants in the Low Countries to colonize the Azores.

The first references to the settlement of the Azores date to between 1439 and 1449, through the donation of Henry the Navigator the colonization of seven islands in the central and eastern groups of the archipelago. Terceira, included in this group, would be administered by Jácome de Bruges as stipulated in the nomination process, dated March 1450, that included not only the settlement of the lands, but also the milling monopoly, ovens, salt concession, land rights in the name of the monarchy, tithes, administration of justice, and rights of succession including the exceptional provision for materlineal succession. But, the great difficulty in attracting settlers meant that by 22 August 1460, the island was still unpopulated.

The site chosen by the first settlers was a ridgeline, which opened, like an amphitheatre, onto two small bays, separated by a peninsula, at the head of which stood the extinct volcano of Monte Brasil. One of these coves was deep enough (around 40 m or 130 ft) to provide an anchorage for large vessels, and it had the further advantage of being sheltered from most strong winds, except for those from the south and southeast.

In 1474, Álvaro Martins Homem ordered that the river flowing into the cove be diverted into a manmade stone-lined channel, running downhill, so that its rushing waters could be harnessed to turn the waterwheel of a mill. This laid the foundation for the future economic development of the village of Angra. At the same time, this allowed the area on either side of the river's course to be rearranged according to a rectilinear street-plan and organized into neighborhoods by function (commercial, residential, etc.), to accommodate the needs of the fast-growing port. The first houses of Angra were built on the hillside above the cove, the steep streets winding down to the shore. On high ground, away from the sea, a castle/stronghold/fortress was begun; it would eventually be named Castelo dos Moinhos (English: Castle of the Mills). By 1534, Angra was the first town in the archipelago to be elevated to the status of city. In the same year, it was chosen by Pope Paul III to be the seat of the Diocese of Angra, with ecclesiastical authority over all of the islands of the Azores.

The commercial port of early Angra played an important role in the Portuguese East Indies trade beginning in the 15th century. The bay of Angra was often full of caravels and galleons, a circumstance that contributed to the progress of the city and its people. The construction of a number of manors, convents, churches, and military fortifications in Angra, infrastructures that were usually inappropriate for a small city (or small island) indicates the important role that Angra played in trans-Atlantic shipping for the Portuguese. The Portuguese nobleman Pero Anes do Canto (1480–1556), who was born at Guimarães, was the superintendent of fortifications on Terceira. For his competency in that role, and other services to the Portuguese Crown, he was rewarded with the title moço fidalgo (knight-gentleman), and the high office of "Purveyor to the Armada of the Islands and the merchant vessels of the East India trade in all of the islands of the Azores" (a hereditary title that followed successive members of the Canto family for three hundred years). The importance and power of the Cantos can hardly be overstated. During the period when Portugal was trading with its Asian, African, and South American colonies, they were responsible for the protection and welfare of the merchant fleet (and the staggering wealth represented by the cargoes in their holds) once the ships approached the last leg of their voyages in the North Atlantic. They were also responsible for acting as the chief customs official, the chief magistrate charged with resolving disputes, and the overseer of the naval defenses of the Azores.

=== Portuguese succession ===
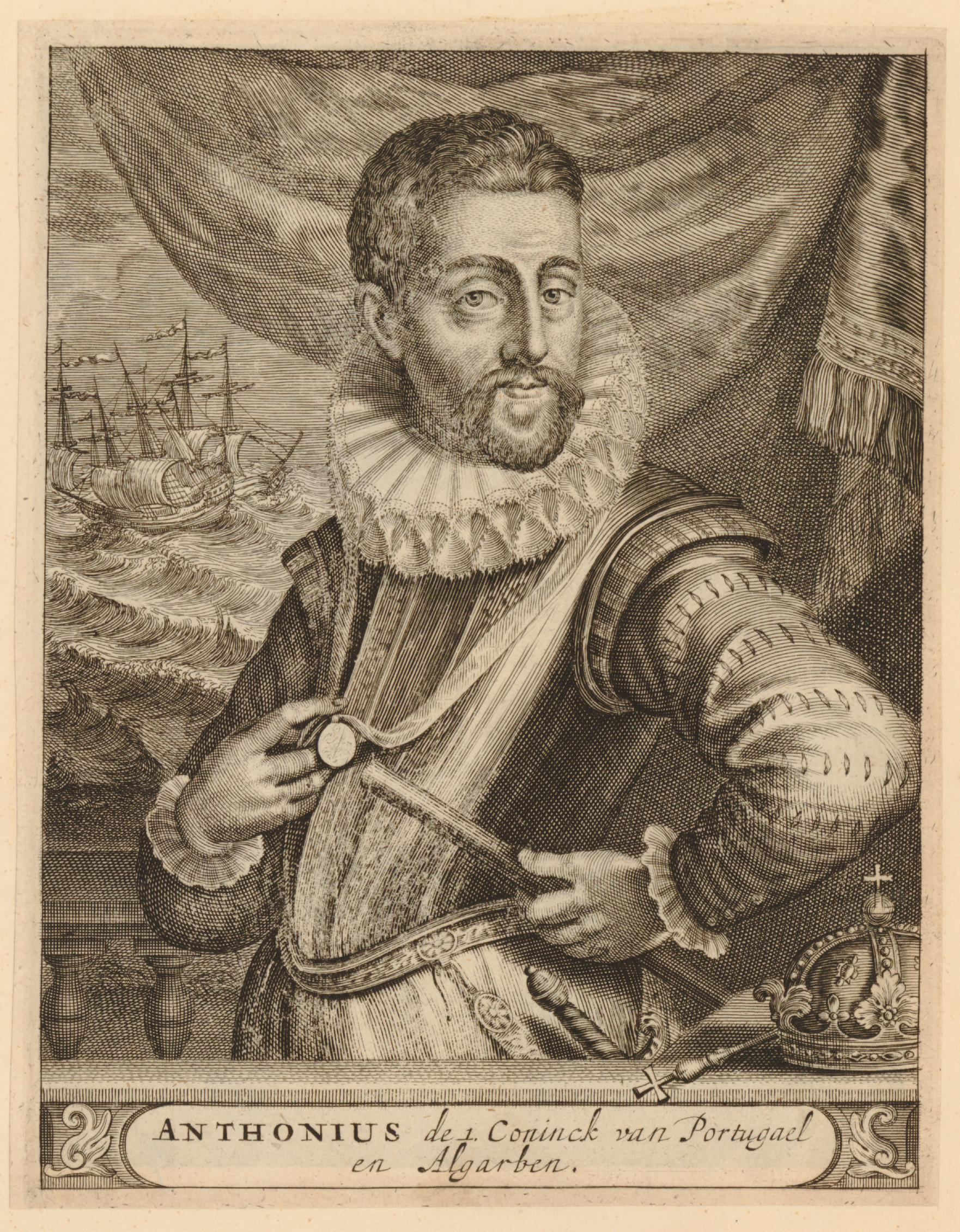
King António, Prior of Crato, who ruled Portugal from Angra during the 16th-century succession crisis

Before Philip II of Spain had a chance to enforce his claim to the crown of Portugal, in 1580, António, Prior of Crato, an illegitimate scion of the Beja line of the House of Braganza Portuguese royal family, proclaimed himself king on 24 July 1580. However, his rule in continental Portugal lasted only twenty days; on 25 August, he was defeated at the Battle of Alcântara by the Spanish Habsburg armies led by Fernando Álvarez de Toledo, Duke of Alba.

After Alcântara, he attempted to rule Portugal from the Azores, where he established an opposition government in Angra do Heroísmo that lasted until 1583. Although for a time he was the monarch (minting coin and conferring titles), his government on Terceira was only recognized in the Azores, and from that place of refuge, António conducted a popular resistance movement opposed to the recognition of a foreign king. He was supported by a number of French adventurers under Filippo di Piero Strozzi, a Florentine exile in the service of France, as well as Portuguese patriots, some of whom came to the Azores to assist him directly.

Battle of Salga Bay

The first military action in the Azores occurred about a year after António's crushing defeat at Alcântara. A Spanish fleet of ten warships, commanded by Pedro Valdez, bombarded Angra on 5 July 1581, then began investigating the coast of the island in search of the best landing places. At dawn on 25 July, the first ships loaded with Spanish troops anchored in Salga Bay, about twelve kilometres east of Angra's harbour in the village of Vila de São Sebastião. A coastwatcher, stationed at the cape called Ponta do Coelho, gave the alarm, but when the first Portuguese forces arrived about one thousand Castilians had already landed and had started to sack the surrounding villages. In this phase of the fighting, according to local accounts of the action, a leading role was played by young and pretty Brianda Pereira who, together with other women, attacked the enemy with farm implements when she saw her house destroyed.

By midmorning, the Spaniards were sweeping the coast with their artillery, and the fighting was fierce. About midday, when the outcome of the battle was still unsettled, an Augustinian friar called Pedro, who was taking an active part in the struggle, thought of the stratagem of driving cattle against the Spaniards so as to scatter them. Over a thousand head of cattle were quickly gathered and, by means of shouts and musket shots, driven against the enemy positions. The disconcerted Spaniards fell back and were pursued to the shore, where almost all of them lost their lives in the fighting or drowned while trying to reach their boats. This unconventional victory, the Battle of Salga Bay, proved that António could count on a good deal of local support.

Battle of Ponta Delgada

The next major military action did not take place until the following summer. Álvaro de Bazán, 1st Marquis of Santa Cruz, was sent in 1582, as "Admiral of the Ocean", to drive the pretender and his supporters from Angra and the Azores. Badly outnumbered, he won the Battle of Ponta Delgada on 26 July 1582, off the coast of the island of São Miguel, against a loose confederation of Portuguese, French, English, and Dutch privateers.

Battle of Terceira

Although António's fleet was completely defeated at the Battle of Ponta Delgada, the pretender did flee into exile in France after the battle. His supporters were subsequently defeated the following year at the Battle of Terceira, near Angra, on 27 July 1583, which allowed Philip's forces to finally occupy the Azores and complete his unification of the Crowns of Spain and Portugal. Yet, Santa Cruz, the Spanish admiral, who was acclaimed for his victories against the House of Aviz and its partisans in the Azores, recognized that England presented a grave threat to Spain's empire, and he became a zealous advocate of war with the English. A letter he wrote to Philip II from Angra do Heroísmo, on 9 August 1583, two weeks after the Battle of Terceira, contains the first definite suggestion of the formation of the Spanish Armada.

It was following the events of the battle of Terceira that the existing fortifications in Monte Brasil were rethought. During the Anglo-Spanish War (1585–1604), the original Portuguese fortifications were redesigned by Italian military engineer Giovanni Vicenzo Casale and his assistants, since privateers, such as Francis Drake and Walter Raleigh, had attacked Spanish ships and possessions. The first cornerstone was laid in 1583, and the fortifications were progressively elaborated to include several bastions and cannon emplacements. By the Restoration, the Spanish commander, Álvaro de Viveiros, resisted for eleven months (from 27 March 1641 to 4 March 1642) behind the walls of the impregnable fortress, and only a concentrated task force commanded by Francisco Ornelas da Câmara and João de Bettencourt were able to defeat the commander. The fort was taken, and reclaimed for Portugal: a church was constructed within the fortress in honour of Saint John the Baptist (Portuguese: São João Baptista) after 1642.

=== 17th century ===
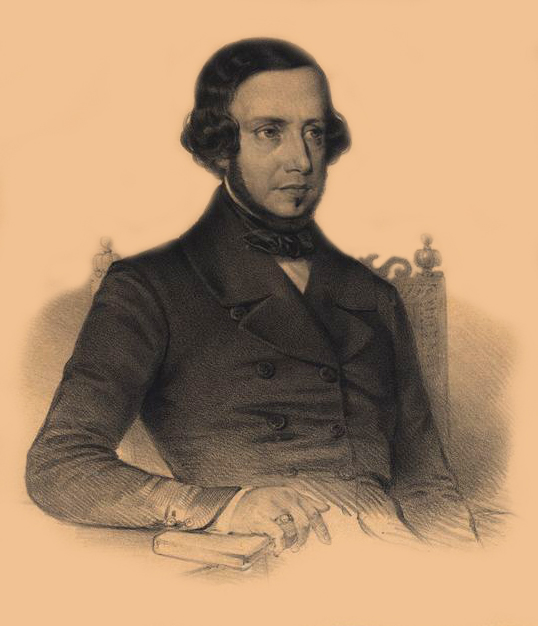
A young Almeida Garret, during the Napoleonic invasions escaped, along with his family to Angra, where they remained until English forces liberated the Iberian Peninsula

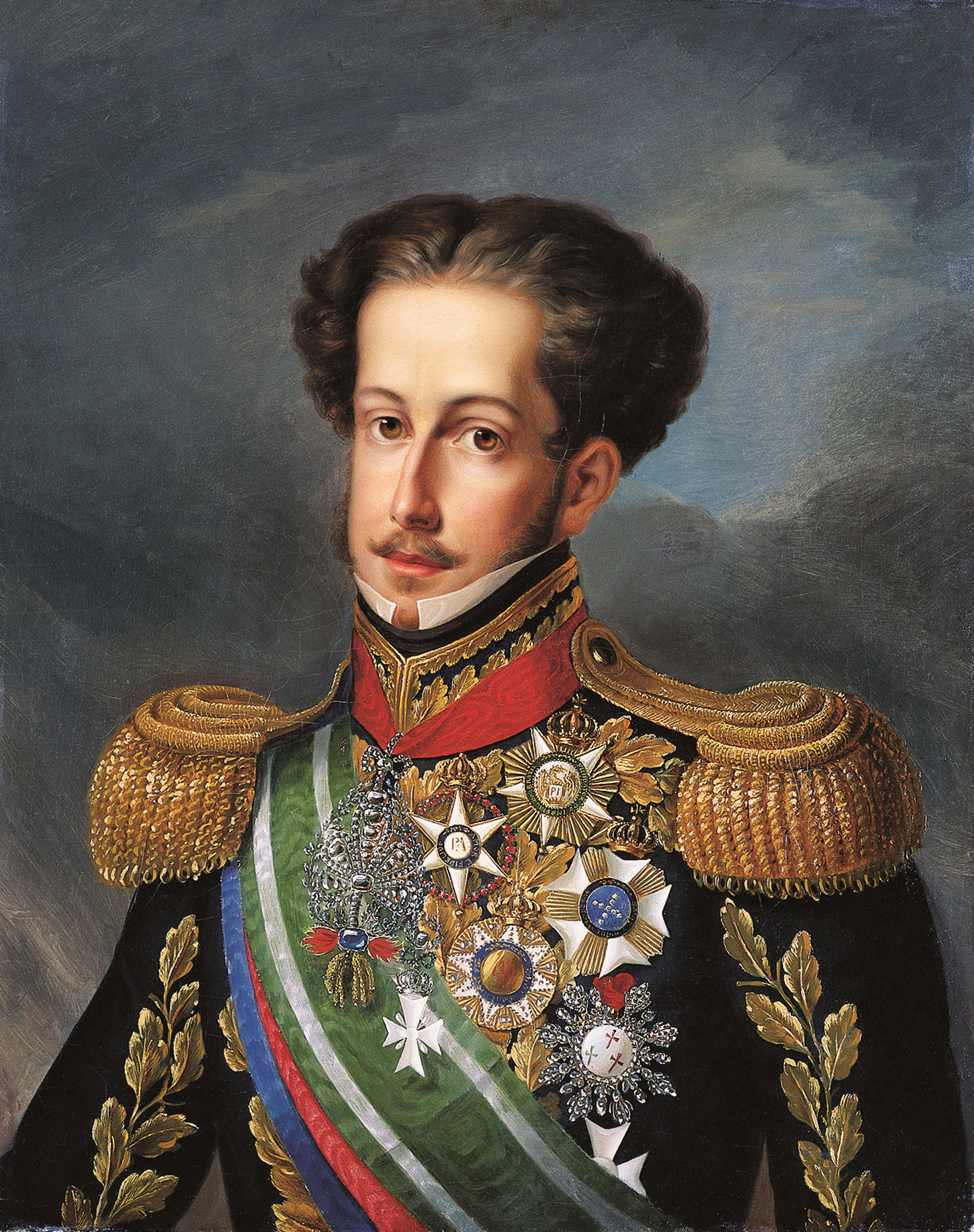
After a time in London, former Emperor Pedro I of Brazil joined liberal forces in Angra do Heroísmo, where he made a base for his eventual assault on the continent during the Liberal Wars

Over the years, Terceira (and Angra in particular) has been a popular place for out-of-favor monarchs to cool their heels while events on the Portuguese mainland or elsewhere went on without them. In 1667, near the end of the Portuguese Restoration War, King Afonso VI, his chief advisor, Castelo Melhor, and Castelo Melhor's francophile party were overthrown by the king's younger brother, Pedro, Duke of Beja, (who later ruled as Pedro II of Portugal.) Pedro first installed himself as his brother's regent; then, he arranged Afonso's exile to the island of Terceira in the Azores on the pretense that he was incapable of governing. Afonso's exile lasted seven years.

João Baptista da Silva Leitão de Almeida Garrett, better known as the author Almeida Garrett, was born in 1799 in Porto, Portugal. In 1809, his family fled the second French invasion carried out by Soult's troops, seeking refuge in Angra do Heroísmo. While in the Azores, he was taught by his uncles, all prominent churchmen. (His uncle, Dom Frei Alexandre da Sagrada Família, was the twenty-fifth bishop of Angra.) In 1818, Almeida Garrett left the island and moved to Coimbra to study at the university's law school.

=== 19th century ===
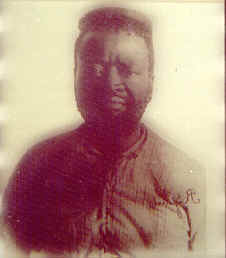
Ngungunhane, the Lion of Gaza, was captured by Portuguese forces after his rebellion in Portuguese West Africa and exiled to Angra do Heroísmo

When King João VI died in 1826, the country was plunged into a succession crisis. The king had a rightful male heir, Emperor Pedro of Brazil, who had successfully rebelled against his father in the 1820s. Many prominent Portuguese, however, did not wish to be reunified with their former colony. The king's younger son Miguel was exiled in Austria, having led a number of failed revolutions of his own against his father's liberal regime. Pedro abdicated the Portuguese throne in favor of his 7-year-old daughter Maria da Glória, stipulating that she would marry her uncle Miguel when she came of age. In order to rule jointly with his niece, however, Miguel was obligated to swear an oath to uphold the existing liberal constitution. Miguel initially agreed but quickly reneged. He deposed his young niece and began establishing an absolutist monarchy.

Pedro and his daughter then began a conflict known variously as the Liberal Wars, the Portuguese Civil War, the War of the Two Brothers, and the Miguelite War. On June 22, 1828, liberals deposed the Azores' captain-general Manuel Vieira de Albuquerque Touvar, deporting him to the mainland and establishing a headquarters on Terceira. The Battle of Praia da Vitória on August 11, 1829, saw the Terceirans repulse a Miguelist attack. This would lead to Angra being given the honorary title of do Heroísmo, "the Heroic". Maria da Glória resided on the island from 1830 to 1833; her forces were victorious the following year.

On 20 September 1836, Charles Darwin, the eminent English naturalist, nearing the end of his voyage around the world aboard the research vessel HMS Beagle, arrived at the Azores and anchored at Angra. The next day, Darwin hired a horse and some guides and rode to the center of the island where an active volcanic crater was supposed to exist. What he found there was not a "crater" at all; instead, what he found was a series of fissures in the rock with steam issuing from them. To a naturalist, his long day in the saddle was not very illuminating. Biologically speaking, Darwin wrote, he could "find nothing of interest". The next day, Darwin traveled along the coast road and visited the town of Praia da Vitória on the northeastern end of the island. He returned by way of the northern shore, and he crossed the central part of the island on his way back to the Beagle. He departed on 25 September for the island of São Miguel, to pick up any letters that may have been posted to him there.

Angra and neighboring Praia da Vitória were the sites of an interesting episode of the American Civil War. Unable to break the blockade by US Navy ships of southern (Confederate) ports, and hoping to draw these blockading ships away to counter other perceived threats, the Confederate States of America had commerce raiders built in Britain and France. One of these left Liverpool in July 1862 in the guise of a "merchant ship" and rendezvoused with supporting ships in the harbor of Praia da Vitória. This meeting-place was chosen because Portugal was neutral and the Azores were far away from pursuing US Navy ships. In that port and, later at Angra, cannon and other supplies of war were transferred aboard the new ship. The CSS Alabama was commissioned on 24 August 1862 just outside the harbor of Angra, and it left Terceira to begin its career as the most effective commerce raider in naval history.

Ngungunhane (also known as Mdungazwe Ngungunyane Nxumalo, N'gungunhana, or Gungunhana Reinaldo Frederico Gungunhana) was born in Gaza in southern Africa around 1850, and he died at Angra do Heroísmo on 23 December 1906. A vassal of the Portuguese king, he later rebelled, and he was defeated and imprisoned by the Portuguese Army, led by Joaquim Mouzinho de Albuquerque. He was exiled to Lisbon and then to the island of Terceira, where he converted to Catholicism; he lived there until his death. He was the last emperor of the Empire of Gaza, a territory that is now part of Mozambique, and he was the last monarch of his dynasty.

Nicknamed the "Lion of Gaza", he reigned from 1884 to 28 December 1895, the day he was made prisoner by Joaquim Mouzinho de Albuquerque in the fortified village of Chaimite. Because he was already known to the European press, the Portuguese colonial administration decided to condemn him to exile rather than send him to face a firing squad, as would normally be the case. He was transported to Lisbon, accompanied by a son named Godide and other dignitaries. After a brief stay, he was transferred to Angra do Heroísmo, where he died eleven years later.

=== 20th century ===
Angra was hit by a major earthquake on 1 January 1980 that did considerable damage to the city's historic center and to many other locations on the island of Terceira. The Azores have experienced many earthquakes and volcanic eruptions since prehistoric times, but the 1980 event was probably the most serious since the eighteenth century. The damage in the city was repaired and rebuilt within four years. In 1983, the historic center of Angra do Heroísmo was named a UNESCO World Heritage Site.

== Geography ==
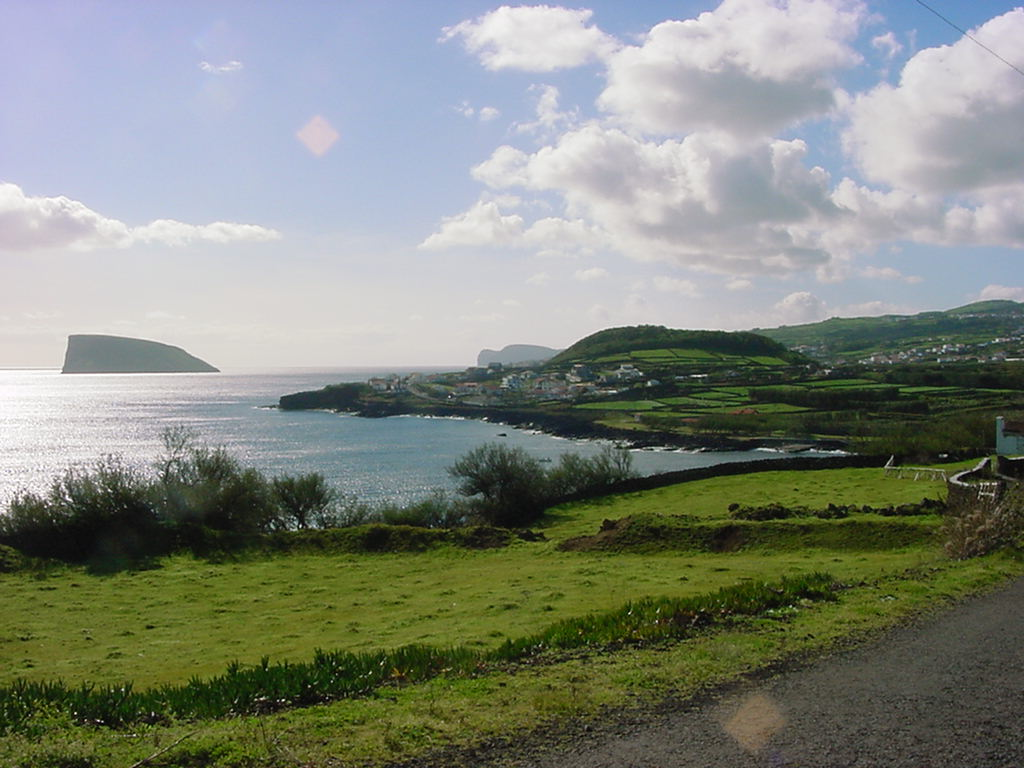
Angra do Heroísmo

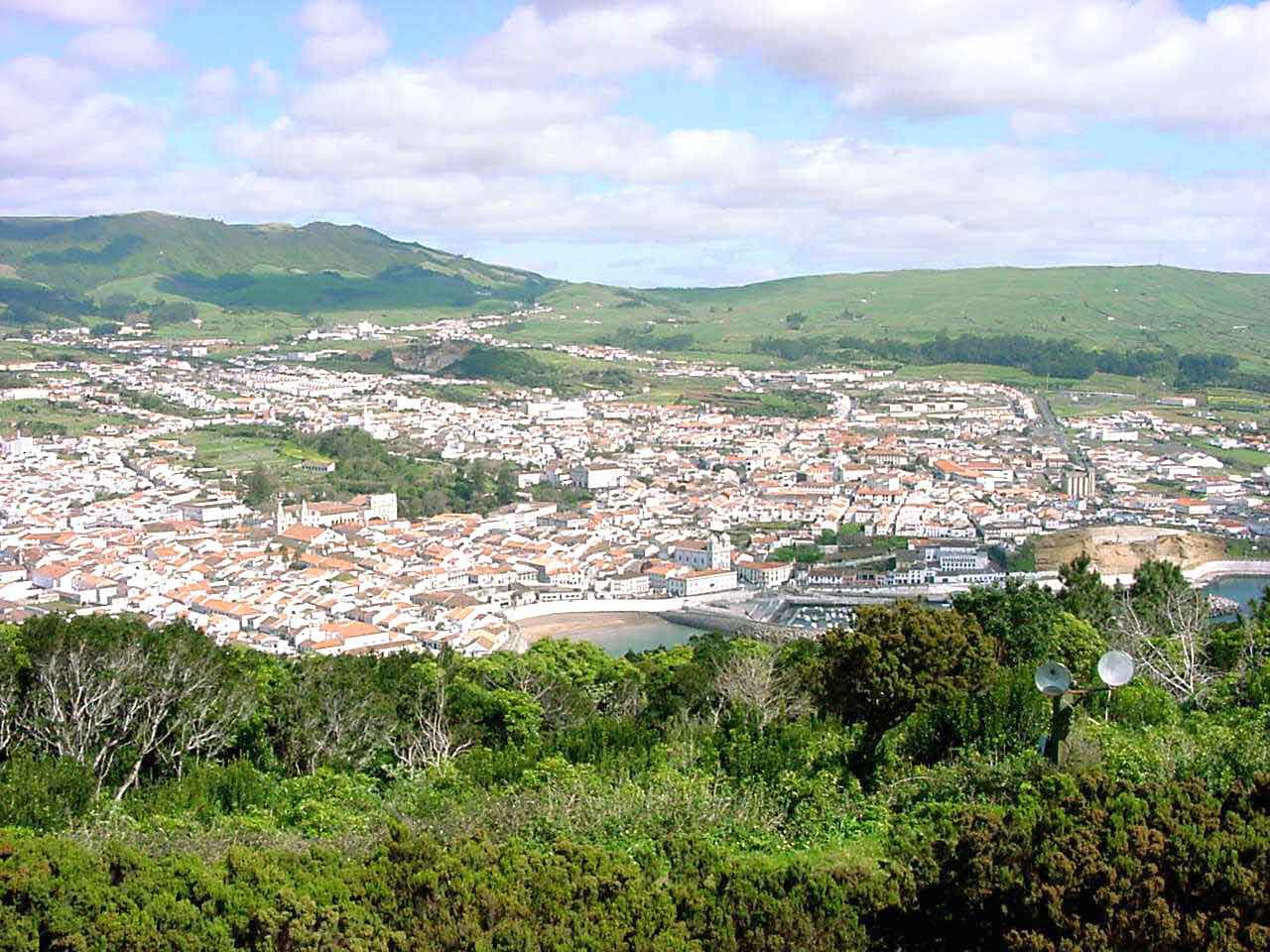
The city of Angra, surrounded by the green landscapes of Monte Brasil and Serra do Morião

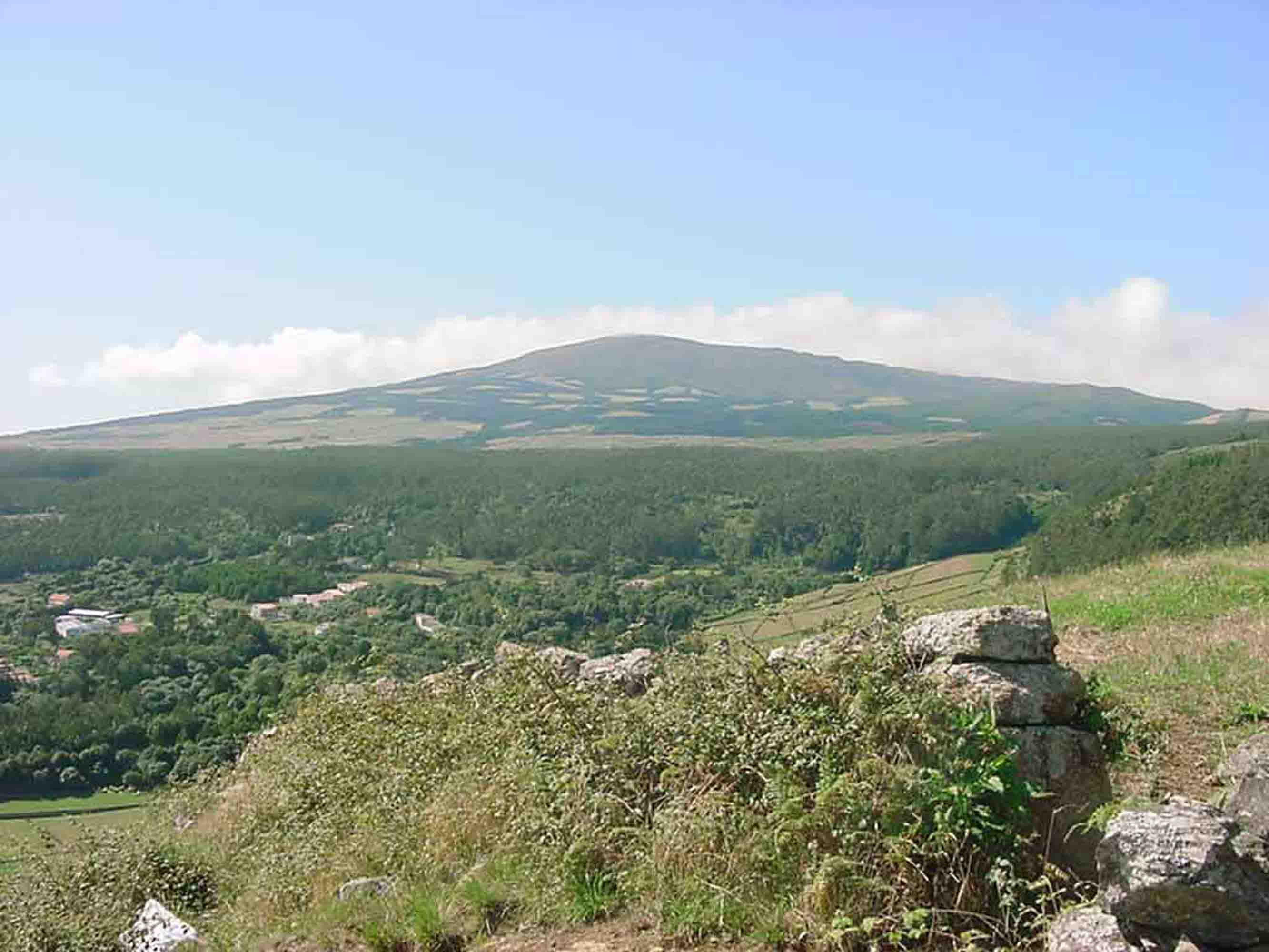
The massive shield volcano of Santa Bárbara, the highest peak on the island of Terceira

Angra occupies the south coast of Terceira. It is the headquarters of a military command and the seat of a Roman Catholic bishopric. Its principal buildings are the Sé Cathedral of Angra do Heroísmo, a military college, an arsenal, and an observatory. The harbor, now of little commercial or strategic importance (but formerly a major commercial and military port), is sheltered on the west and southwest by the promontory of Monte Brasil, but, today, it is less important than the neighboring ports of Ponta Delgada on the island of São Miguel and Horta on the island of Faial.

- Jardim Duque da Terceira
- Miradouro da Amoreira
- Miradouro do Pico das Cruzinhas
- Miradouro da Ponta do Queimado
- Miradouro do Pico Matias Simão
- Miradouro da Serreta
- Miradouro das Veredas
- Mata da Serreta
- Parque Municipal do Relvão
- Parque Arqueológico Subaquático da Baía de Angra do Heroísmo
- Parque de Campismo das Cinco Ribeiras

=== Ecoregions/Protected areas ===
- Algar do Carvão
- Baía de Angra do Heroísmo
- Baía das Pontas
- Baía da Salga
- Baía do Refugo
- Baía dos Salgueiros
- Furna de Água
- Galerias da Feteira
- Gruta do Natal
- Gruta Brisa Azul
- Gruta das Mercês
- Gruta do Zé Grande
- Gruta das Cinco Ribeiras
- Gruta das Agulhas
- Gruta dos Ratões
- Ilhéus das Cabras
- Lagoa do Negro
- Monte Brasil
- Porto das Cinco Ribeiras
- Ponta do Queimado
- Prainha (Angra do Heroísmo)
- Serra do Morião
- Serra da Ribeirinha
- Serra de Santa Bárbara
- Zona Balnear do Negrito
- Zona de Protecção Especial do Ilhéu das Cabras

=== Climate ===
The climate of Angra do Heroísmo is borderline Mediterranean (Csa) and humid subtropical (Cfa), with the August daily mean being just above the 22 °C (72 °F) isotherm and the July rainfall just below the 30 mm isotherm for the oceanic climate (Cfb) regime. It is also tempered by the Gulf Stream and the warm North Atlantic waters surrounding the Azores, with mild winter temperatures. Temperatures above 30 °C (86 °F) have never been recorded, with summer days reliably staying around 24 °C (75 °F) to 25 °C (77 °F).

Climate data for José Agostinho Observatory, Angra do Heroísmo (1991–2020), elevation 90 m (300 ft)
Month	Jan	Feb	Mar	Apr	May	Jun	Jul	Aug	Sep	Oct	Nov	Dec	Year
Record high °C (°F)	20.5 (68.9)	20.8 (69.4)	22.1 (71.8)	22.0 (71.6)	23.9 (75.0)	26.7 (80.1)	29.2 (84.6)	29.3 (84.7)	28.4 (83.1)	26.7 (80.1)	25.0 (77.0)	21.2 (70.2)	29.3 (84.7)
Mean daily maximum °C (°F)	16.6 (61.9)	16.5 (61.7)	16.7 (62.1)	17.6 (63.7)	19.1 (66.4)	21.5 (70.7)	24.2 (75.6)	25.5 (77.9)	24.2 (75.6)	21.6 (70.9)	18.9 (66.0)	17.4 (63.3)	20.0 (68.0)
Daily mean °C (°F)	14.5 (58.1)	14.2 (57.6)	14.5 (58.1)	15.2 (59.4)	16.6 (61.9)	18.9 (66.0)	21.4 (70.5)	22.6 (72.7)	21.6 (70.9)	19.2 (66.6)	16.8 (62.2)	15.3 (59.5)	17.6 (63.6)
Mean daily minimum °C (°F)	12.5 (54.5)	11.9 (53.4)	12.2 (54.0)	12.8 (55.0)	14.2 (57.6)	16.4 (61.5)	18.6 (65.5)	19.7 (67.5)	18.9 (66.0)	16.8 (62.2)	14.6 (58.3)	13.2 (55.8)	15.2 (59.3)
Record low °C (°F)	6.0 (42.8)	4.2 (39.6)	3.8 (38.8)	5.9 (42.6)	8.9 (48.0)	10.5 (50.9)	13.3 (55.9)	15.0 (59.0)	12.4 (54.3)	8.2 (46.8)	8.4 (47.1)	5.5 (41.9)	3.8 (38.8)
Average precipitation mm (inches)	102.9 (4.05)	90.1 (3.55)	105.4 (4.15)	80.2 (3.16)	77.1 (3.04)	50.6 (1.99)	27.3 (1.07)	40.9 (1.61)	84.3 (3.32)	115.5 (4.55)	103.7 (4.08)	154.4 (6.08)	1,032.4 (40.65)
Average precipitation days	12.8	11.3	12.4	10.1	8.2	6.0	4.8	6.4	8.2	12.8	11.7	14.8	119.5
Source: Instituto Português do Mar e da Atmosfera

=== Human geography ===
Administratively, the municipality of Angra do Heroísmo is made up of several civil parishes, which were historically parochial entities administered by the Catholic Church. After the expulsion of the religious orders from Portugal, the Portuguese administration adapted these territorial units into secular institutions that became the foundation of local government. In a civil context, a parish (freguesia in Portuguese) is simply a subdivision of a municipality (concelho or município). The nineteen civil parishes of Angra do Heroísmo are:

- Altares
- Cinco Ribeiras
- Doze Ribeiras
- Feteira
- Nossa Senhora da Conceição
- Porto Judeu
- Posto Santo
- Raminho
- Ribeirinha
- Santa Bárbara
- Santa Luzia
- São Bartolomeu de Regatos
- São Bento
- São Mateus da Calheta
- São Pedro
- Sé
- Serreta
- Terra Chã
- Vila de São Sebastião

Thirteen of the parishes have a thousand people or more, and 88.71% of the population live in these larger parishes. About 11.3% of the population live in the remaining six small parishes. The most populated parish is Nossa Senhora da Conceição (Our Lady of Conception), and the least populated is Serreta. The largest parish geographically is Porto Judeu, and the smallest is Santa Luzia.

== Architecture ==
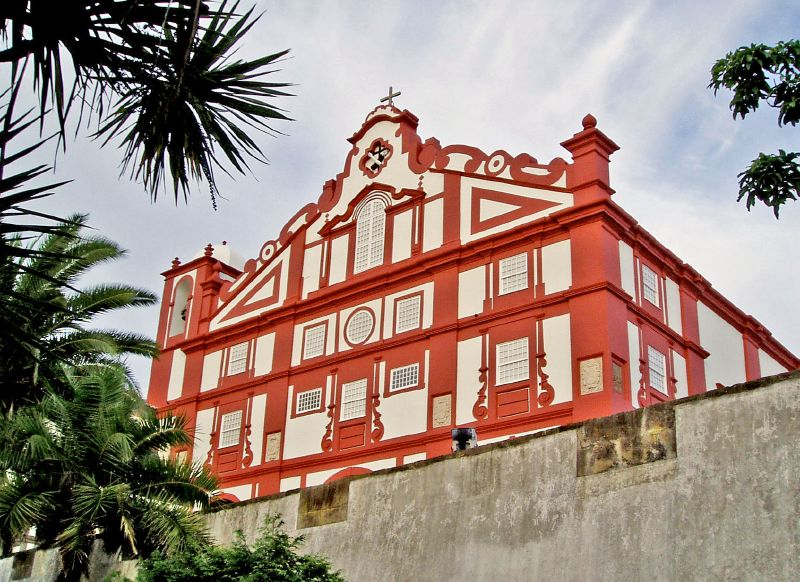
The Convent of São Francisco was founded in 1470.

=== Civic ===
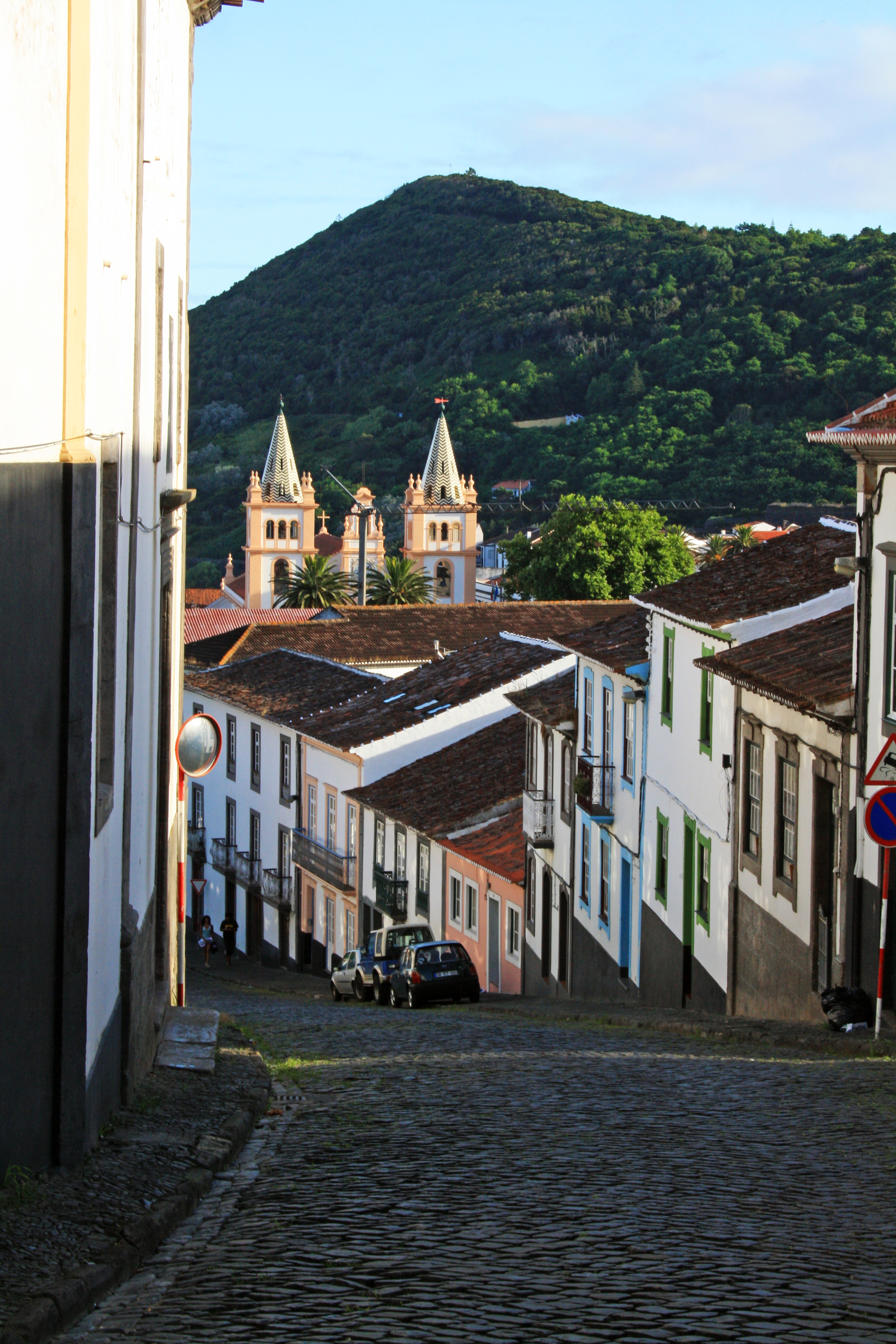
Downtown Angra

The historic centre of Angra, is located along the southern coast, encompassing the medieval city and fortified citadel that forms the volcanic cone of Monte Brasil. Angra is dominated by the Old Square (Portuguese: Praça Velha), also known as the Square of Saints Cosmo and Damian (Portuguese: Praça de São Cosmo e Daimão) or the Restoration Square (Portuguese: Praça dos Restoradores). It was one of the first Portuguese squares specifically designed as a broad open space, joining two of the old town's main arteries. Angra's square is a broad and orderly, paved with Portuguese pavement stone (of white limestone and black basalt). Throughout its history, this main square has had various functions: it was a chicken and livestock market on Sundays; during the struggles between the Liberals and the Absolutists (during the Liberal Wars) it was the site of public hangings; and the location where the local running of the bulls began. The well-planned and handsome square in Angra owes its character to the influence of the 1755 Lisbon earthquake, which resulted in the reconstruction program that influenced many of the towns and villages of Portugal. The old square (which reached its ultimate form during the late 18th century) reflects this new thinking and approach to urbanism and transport. After the 19th century (specifically 1879), it served as a central gathering place for concerts by the military band of the 10th Chasseur regiment, whose barracks were in the Fort of São João Baptista.

- Building of the Angra do Heroísmo Savings (Portuguese: Caixa Económica de Angra do Heroísmo);
- Cemetery of Anchors (Portuguese: Cemitério das Âncoras);
- Customshouse of Angra do Heroísmo (Portuguese: Alfândega de Angra do Heroísmo); constructed to support the influx of peoples and commercial resources into the 15th century colonies of the Azores, the long-house-like civil structure was constructed in the 16th century along the Patio da Alfândega alongside the primitive wharf and Church of the Misericórida;
- Manor of D. Violante do Canto (Portuguese: Casa de Dona Violante do Canto/Solar de Dona Violante do Canto);
- Manor of Madre de Deus (Portuguese: Solar de Madre de Deus), constructed by João de Bettencourt de Vasconcelos who (along with his brother-in-law, Captain-major Francisco Ornelas da Câmara) used this building in 1641 during their blockade of the fortress of São João Baptista, and carved-out trenches around the building in order to defend the site;
- Manor of Nossa Senhora dos Remédios (Portuguese: Solar e Capela de Nossa Senhora dos Remédios), a former-residence of the Canto e Castro family, the 16th century manorhouse was constructed from the residential home of by Pero Anes do Canto, who was nominated as the first Provisionor-of-Arms (in 1527). Responsible for supporting the caravels and carracks that transited the Atlantic, the medieval post was centred in the manorhouse and his descendants expanded the group of buildings, including the large chapel, attributed to Pero's great-great-grandson;
- Manor of the Count of Vila Flor (Portuguese: Casa do Conde de Vila Flor/Solar do Conde de Vila Flor);
- Palace of the Bettencourts (Portuguese: Palácio Bettencourt/Biblioteca Pública e Arquivo Regional de Angra do Heroísmo), a 17th-century building, originally a private home, that houses the public library and regional archives, that includes a repository of 400,000 books and two million documents;
- Palace of the Captains-General (Portuguese: Colégio de Santo Inácio/Colégio da Companhia de Jesus/Palácio dos Capitães Generais (SRAI)), located near the Largo Prior do Crato, the 16th-century building, is intimately linked to the history : it was originally the Jesuit College of Saint Ignatius and later College of the Society of Jesus, before it was abandoned in 1759. When the office of Captain-General was created in 1766, the building was converted into the official residence of the Crowns representatives in the Azores, controlling the military, political, and administrative life of the archipelago;
- Residence of Quinta de Nossa Senhora da Oliveira (Portuguese: Casa of Quinta de Nossa Senhora da Oliveira)
- Cais da Alfândega
- Cais da Silveira
- Câmara Municipal de Angra do Heroísmo
- Porto das Cinco Ribeiras

=== Military ===
The island of Terceira, dating from the 15th century had always been susceptible to attacks by pirates and privateers, first from Barbary coast pirates, but later by European powers who sought to capture spoils from the ships returning from the Far East. Following the personal union between Spain and Portugal, following the Dynastic Crisis, the need to protect the transit points of the Azores led to construction of several posts and redoubts along the coast of the island. Among the most important were:

- Castle of Moinhos (Portuguese: Castelo dos Moinhos), known as the Castle of São Cristóvão, or Castle/Fort of São Luís, is the ruins of a 16th-century fortification overlooking the city of Angra, today surmounted by the Alto da Memória, a 19th-century obelisk dedicated to former King Peter IV of Portugal, whose forces defeated the absolute monarchy of his brother Miguel during the Liberal Wars;
- Fort of Cinco Ribeiras
- Fort of Greta
- Fort of Má Ferramenta (Portuguese: Forte de Má Ferramenta), used throughout the 16th to 20th century, the platform served for a time during the Second World War before being abandoned and left to ruin;
- Fort of Negrito (Portuguese: Forte do Negrito), home to the Azorean Museum of Military History, Negrito was constructed in 1581 (simultaneously with the Fort of Salga) to provide protection from the then imminent Spanish attack caused by the Succession Crisis of 1580.
- Fort of Salga
- Fort of Santa Catarina das Mós
- Fort of Santo António
- Fort of Santo António do Monte Brasil (Portuguese: Forte de Santo António do Monte Brasil), the small fort, which was named after António of Portugal extended the defences of the Bay of Angra by crossing-fire with the Fort of São Sebastião, owing to the shorter range of the former;
- Fort of São Benedito do Monte Brasil
- Fort of São Fernando
- Fort of São Francisco
- Fort of São João (Portuguese: Forte de São João), also known as the Fort of Biscoitinhos, was included in the fortification plans of Tommaso Benedetto, but little was done to improve the large redoubt, which was mistakenly confused, at various times, with the Redoubt of Poço and/or Fort of Açougue;
- Fort of São João Baptista (Portuguese: Igreja de São João Baptista do Castelo, Fortaleza e Muralhas); Angra do Heroísmo is dominated by the cinder cone of Monte Brasil, on which is located the fortress of São João Baptista, originally completed as the Fort of São Filipe, during the Philippine dynasty, under the reign of Philip II of Spain. The fortress, which includes a primary bulwark and encircled by 4 kilometres (2.5 mi) line of walls with four hundred pieces of artillery, used to protected shipping that returned from the East Indies (laden with gold and silver). The fortress is dominated by the Church of São João Baptista (Portuguese: Igreja de São Joao Baptista) and parade grounds, completed at the end of the end of the Iberian union, following the restoration of Portuguese sovereignty in 1640. At that time, the fortress was renamed to correspond with the name of the church.
- Fort of São Sebastião (Portuguese: Castelo de São Sebastião/Forte de São Sebastião/Pousada de Angra do Heroísmo)At the other end of the Bay of Angra, opposite the Porto de Pipas (Port of Barrels), is the Fort of São Sebastião, built in the 16th century on the order of King Sebastian. The scope of its cannons were interlocked with the ranges of the cannons on Monte Brasil and three other small forts along the coastline, creating an effective defensive system for the port, which had been a favourite target for pirates. The Castelo de São Sebastião has been transformed into a charming hotel, one of the forty-odd pousadas (inns in historic buildings) of Portugal; this transformation preserves its original historic character, but the plumbing has been modernized, and some non-visible structural elements have been strengthened.
- Fort of the Zimbreiro
- Fortress of São Mateus da Calheta (Portuguese: Forte Grande de São Mateus da Calheta), part of a complex of six forts along the southern coast, the Great Fort was constructed after French pirates under Pierre Bertrand de Montluc attacked in 1567;
- Fort of the Açougue
- Fort of the Caninas
- Fort of the Cavalas
- Fort of the Church of São Mateus da Calheta
- Fort of the Maré
- Fort of the Terreiro
- Redoubt of Dois Paus
- Redoubt of Três Paus
- Redoubt of Salga

=== Religious ===
At one stage, Angra had as many as nine convents, each with its own cloisters and churches. Most of these churches are from the Mannerist and Baroque periods, and they are remarkably grand. The interior decoration of these churches relied on the use of both traditional carved and gilded woodwork and the rich and exotic woods of Brazil.

On the Ladeira de São Francisco in central Angra is the Igreja da Nossa Senhora da Guia (Church of Our Lady of Guia), where the seafarer Paulo da Gama is buried. He accompanied his brother Vasco da Gama on his first sea voyage to India in 1497.

- Chapel/Hospital of Nossa Senhora da Boa Nova (Portuguese: Capela e Hospital Militar de Nossa Senhora da Boa Nova)
- Chapel of the Misericórdia of São Sebastião (Portuguese: Capela da Misericórdia de São Sebastião e Casa de Francisco Ferreira Drumond)
- Church of the Society of Jesus College (Portuguese: Colégio de Santo Inácio/Igreja do Colégio da Companhia de Jesus)
- Convent of the Conceptionists (Portuguese: Convento das Concepcionistas)
- Convent of São Gonçalo (Portuguese: Convento de São Gonçalo), established in 1542, through the initiative of nobleman Brás Pires do Canto, to shelter the Clarisse sisters, surviving to 1832 when it was the only surviving convent after the expulsion of the religious orders. It is considered one of the best surviving Baroque era religious institutions in the Azores.
- Convent of Santo António dos Capuchos (Portuguese: Convento de Santo António dos Capuchos)
- Hermitage of Santo Cristo do Cruzeiro (Portuguese: Capela do Cruzeiro/Ermida de Santo Cristo do Cruzeiro)
- (Old) Church of São Mateus da Calheta (Portuguese: Igreja Velha de São Mateus da Calheta)

== Culture ==
=== Azorean bullfight ===
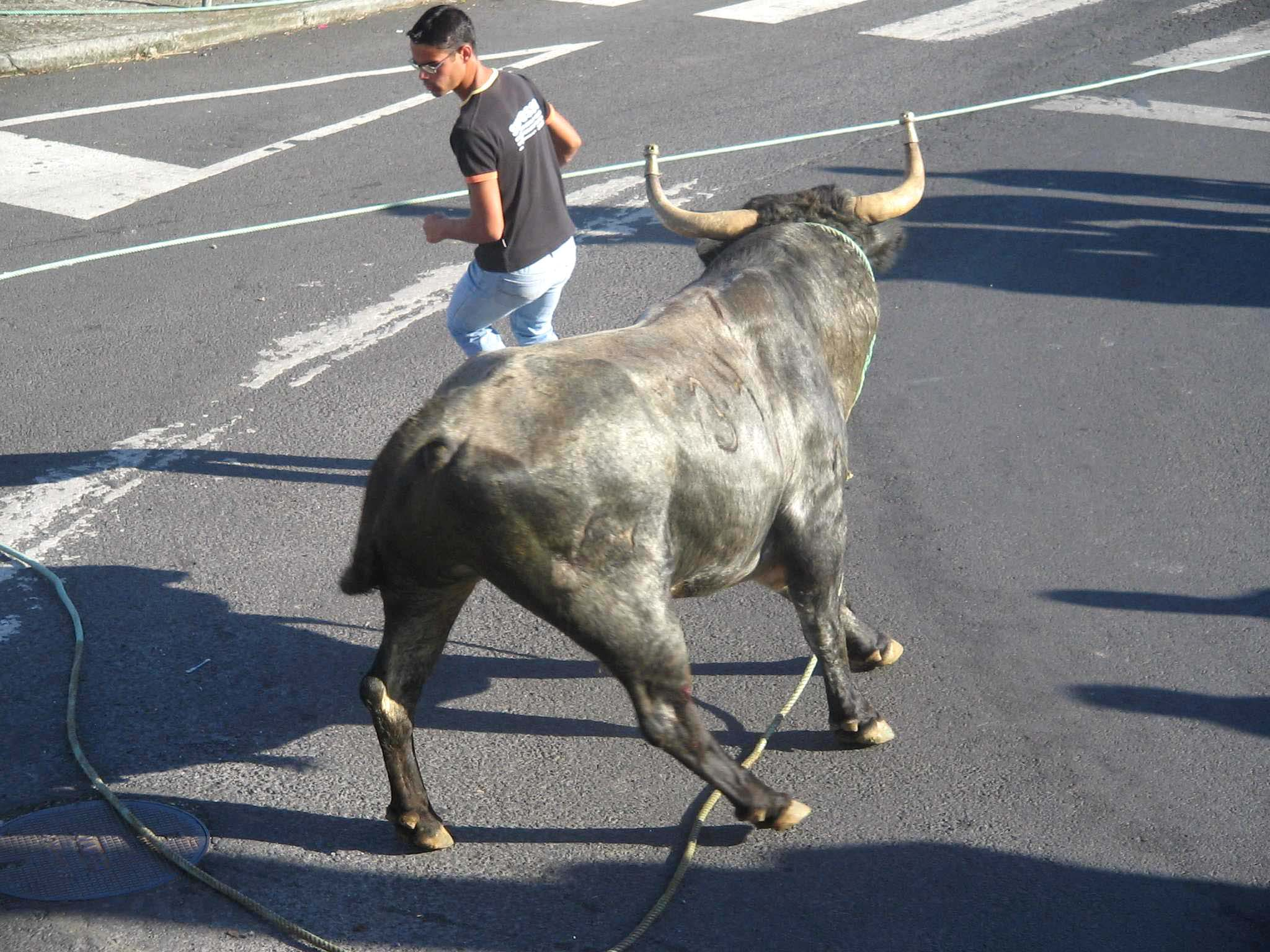
A scene from the traditional touradas à corda, where people and bulls play cat-and-mouse in the streets of parishes of the municipality

The Portuguese version of bullfighting differs considerably from its Spanish counterpart, and the Azorean variety, which began on Terceira, differs from the mainland style in some important respects also. The Azorean bullfight ritual involves "audience participation" in a way that recalls the "running of the bulls" at Pamplona (Spain).

On Terceira, 4 fighting bulls are enclosed in separate wooden crates for several hours and transported to the village where the bullfight will happen, then a long stout rope is secured around each bull's neck. Fireworks are exploded to signal the citizens that a bull will soon be let loose in the public square. Once the bull is released, some young men take hold of the rope to try to control the bull's head, and others taunt the bull with everything from brightly colored fighting capes to parasols. A free-for-all ensues while the bull drags some men around by the rope and tries to punish his tormenters, by butting them to the ground and goring them (with blunted horns), or by trampling over them. This is a popular leisure activity and public entertainment; it is known as the tourada à corda (English: bullfight-on-a-rope).

Eventually, the bull is funneled through the city streets to the bullring, the Praça de Toiros da Ilha (Island Bullring), in the eastern part of Angra, where a traditional Portuguese-style bullfight is held. From May 1 to September 30, there are daily touradas; in fact, sometimes there are two or three in one day.

== Education ==
The University of the Azores, which has its principal campus on the island of São Miguel, has a subsidiary campus in Angra do Heroísmo, where the Department of Agrarian Sciences (Departamento de Ciências Agrárias) is located. This institution is a center for advanced scientific and agricultural studies, and it attracts students from the entire archipelago, as well as foreign students from many countries.

The Instituto Histórico da Ilha Terceira (IHIT), which means, in Portuguese, the "Terceira Island Historical Institute", is a private cultural association, dedicated to the investigation and study of the history of the Azores. It is organized as an academy, and it sponsors classes, lectures, and symposia on various topics. The institute was founded in 1942 by the city of Angra do Heroísmo.

== Transport ==
The city is served by Lajes Airport which provides flights to mainland Portugal and some European destinations.

== Sport ==
Angra has a football team, named S.C. Angrense, that is part of the Associação de Futebol de Angra do Heroísmo. Sport Clube Lusitânia houses the main football and basketball teams on the island. The region's football association is located in Angra do Heroísmo. Both clubs experienced extreme popularity in the 1940's-1980's, in the glory days of Azorian local football. Lusitânia was especially successful, and even reached the semifinal of the Taça de Portugal in 1963/64, and was the first club from the Azores to reach national competitions, and stayed their until 2011/12.

== Twin towns – sister cities ==
Angra do Heroísmo is twinned with:

- Tulare, United States, since 1966
- Salvador, Brazil, since 1985
- Taunton, United States, since 1986
- Évora, Portugal, since 1988
- Florianópolis, Brazil, since 1994
- Gustine, United States, since 2002
- São Vicente, Cape Verde, since 2003
- Gramado, Brazil, since 2004
- Gilroy, United States, since 2005
- Porto Novo, Cape Verde, since 2011
- Cartagena, Colombia, since 2015
- Jining, China, since 2015
- Alenquer, Portugal, since 2016
- Funchal, Portugal, since 2016

== Notable people ==
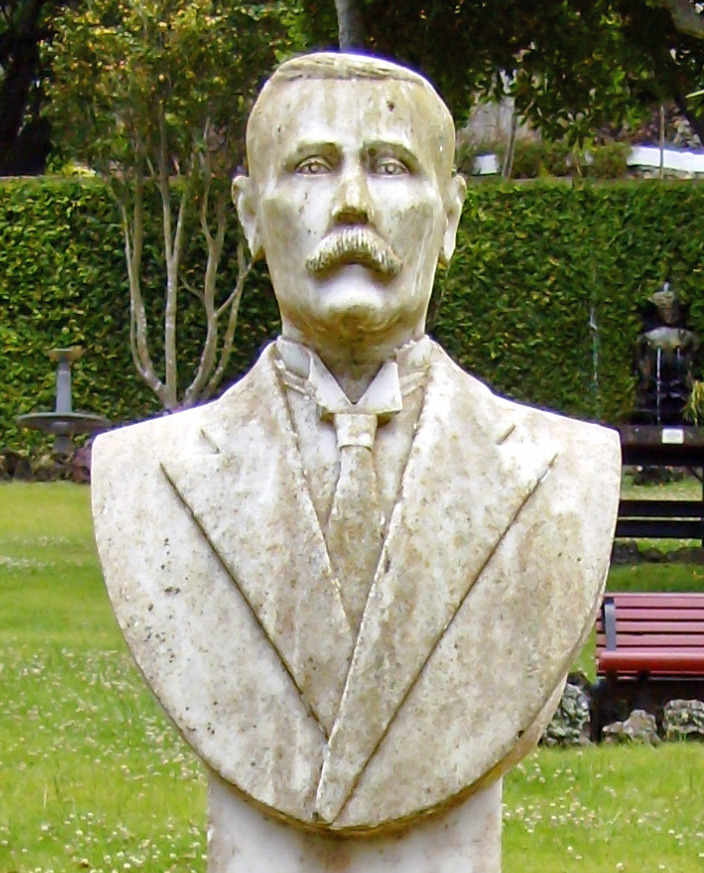
Manuel António Lino

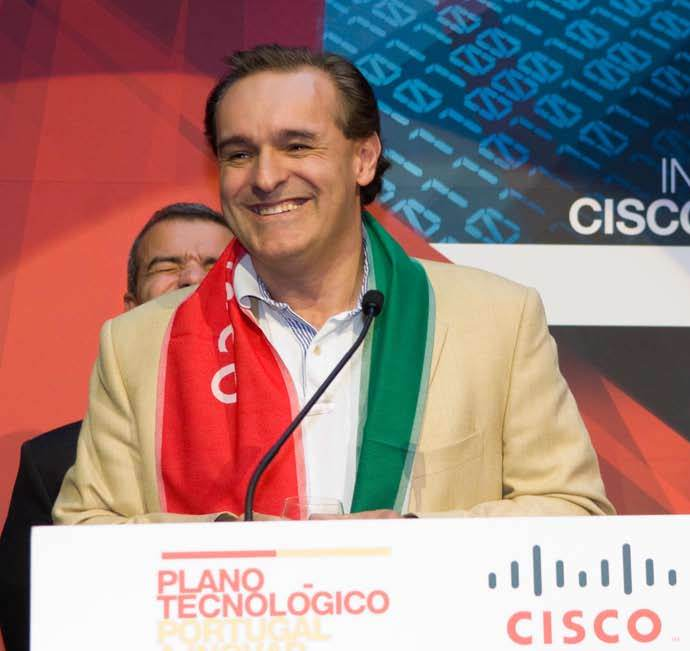
Helder Antunes, tech executive.

- Gaspar Corte-Real (1450 in Angra - 1501) explorer towards parts of eastern Canada.
- Brianda Pereira (ca.1550 in Angra — ca.1620) an Azorean later politicised for her role in the Battle of Salga
- António Cordeiro (1641 in Angra – 1722) Catholic priest, Azorean historian and author
- Manuel Inácio Martins Pamplona Corte Real (1760 in Angra – 1832) a nobleman and politician.
- Peter Francisco (1760 in Porto Judeu – 1831) an American patriot and soldier in the American Revolutionary War.
- Francisco Ferreira Drummond (1796 in Vila de São Sebastião – 1858) an historian, palaeographer, musician and politician
- Diogo de Barcelos Machado Bettencourt (1847 in Angra – 1922) politician and judicial magistrate
- José Júlio de Souza Pinto (1856 in Angra - 1939) a painter in the naturalist style.
- Ana Augusta de Castilho (1860 in Angra – 1916) a feminist, teacher, propagandist, freemason, and republican
- Manuel António Lino (1865 in Angra – 1927) a physician, politician, poet, dramatist and civil governor
- Maria Teodora Pimentel (1865 in Angra -??) first female doctor from the Azores
- Francisco Coelho Maduro Dias (1904 in Angra – 1986) a poet, painter, sculptor, illustrator, teacher, set designer and an overall "theatre man".
- António Dacosta (1914 in Angra – 1990) a painter, poet, art critic and pioneer of the surrealist movement
- Álvaro Monjardino (born 1930 in Angra) lawyer and politician
- Dionísio Mendes de Sousa (born 1940 in Vila de São Sebastião) a politician, writer, educator, and former president of the Legislative Assembly of the Azores.
- José Guilherme Reis Leite (born 1943 in Angra) a professor, historian and Azorean politician
- Vítor Gonçalves (born 1951 in Angra) a filmmaker, film director, screenwriter and film producer.
- Helder Antunes (born 1963 in Angra) a Portuguese-American executive, computer scientist and former racing car driver.
- Eliseu Pereira dos Santos (born 1983 in Angra) known as Eliseu, footballer with 355 club caps and 29 for Portugal
- Jaime Seidi (born 1989 in Angra) a footballer of Bissau-Guinean descent with over 170 club caps
- Isaiah Campbell (born 1997 in Angra) an American baseball player for the Boston Red Sox

== See also ==
- Political status of the Autonomous Region of the Azores
- Political sub-divisions of Portugal
