= Solar de Nossa Senhora dos Remédios =

Manor of Nossa Senhora dos Remédios
- Solar de Nossa Senhora dos Remédios
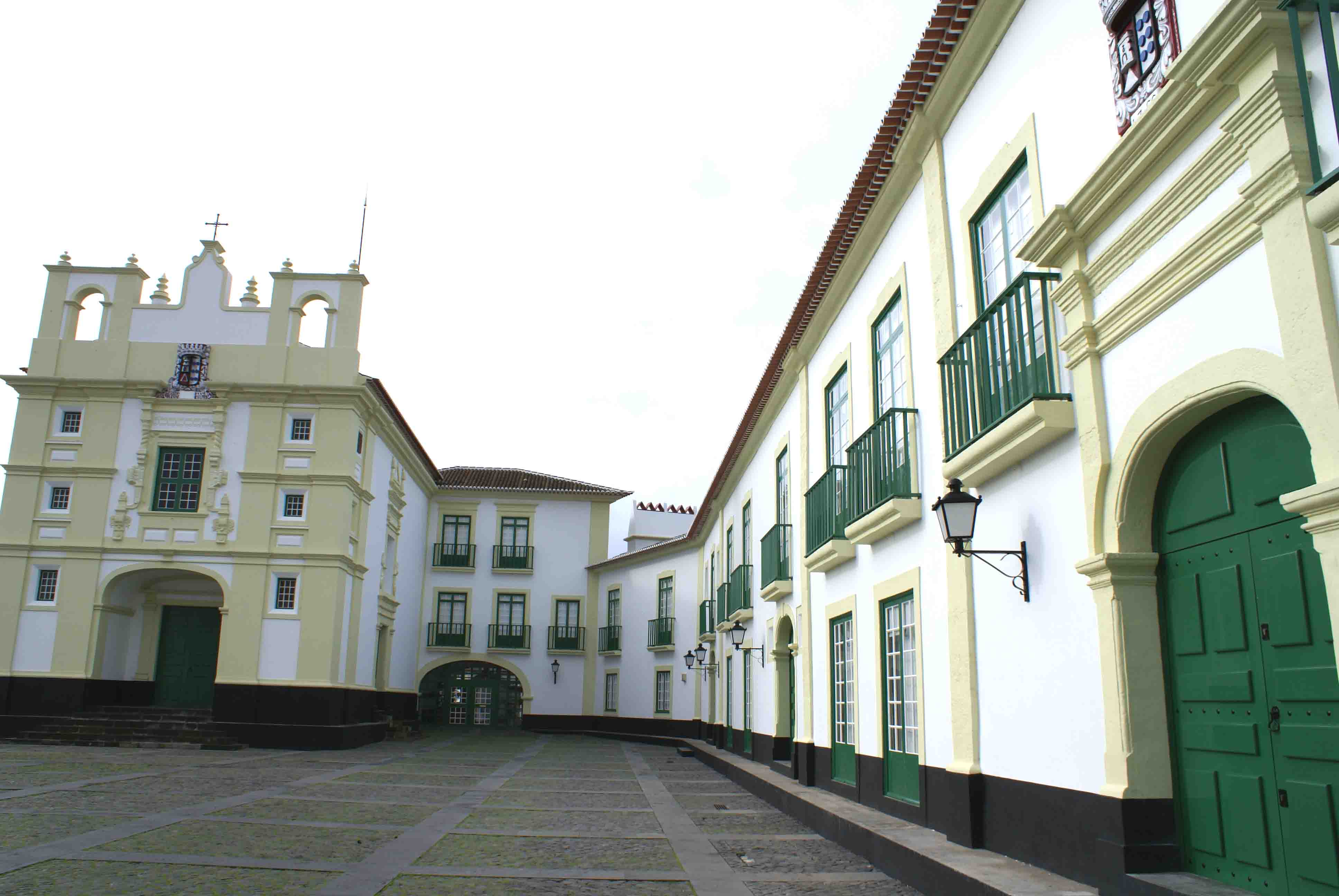
- An oblique view of the manorhouse/chapel group of the Manor of Nossa Senhora dos Remédios
- Interactive map of the Manor of Nossa Senhora dos Remédios area

General information
- Type: Manorhouse
- Location: Nossa Senhora da Conceição, Portugal
- Coordinates: 38°39′17.9″N 27°12′56″W
- Opened: 16th century
- Owner: Portuguese Republic

The Manor of Nossa Senhora dos Remédios (Portuguese: Solar de Nossa Senhora dos Remédios), popularly known as the Manor of Remédios or Manor of the Privisioner of Arms, located in the neighbourhood of Corpo Santo, civil parish of Conceição, in the municipality of Angra do Heroísmo, in the Portuguese archipelago of Azores. It is one of the notable histo-cultural and architectural buildings in the historic centre of Angra, part of the UNESCO-classified heritage site.

== History ==
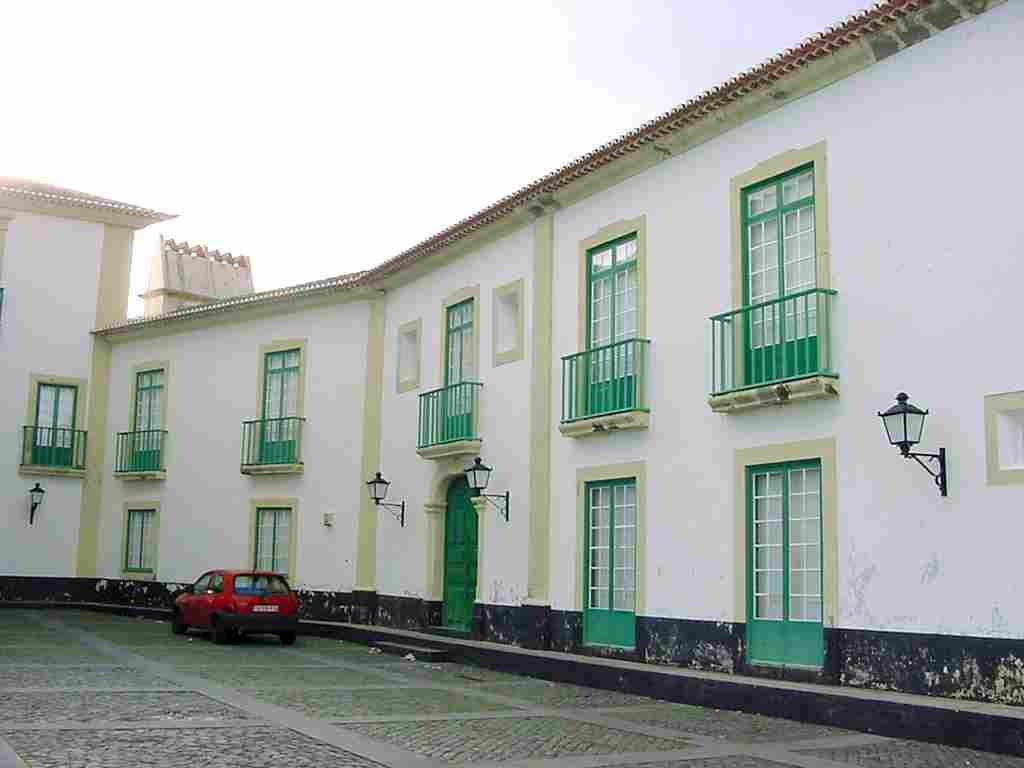
The main manorhouse of Remédios, along the southeast facade

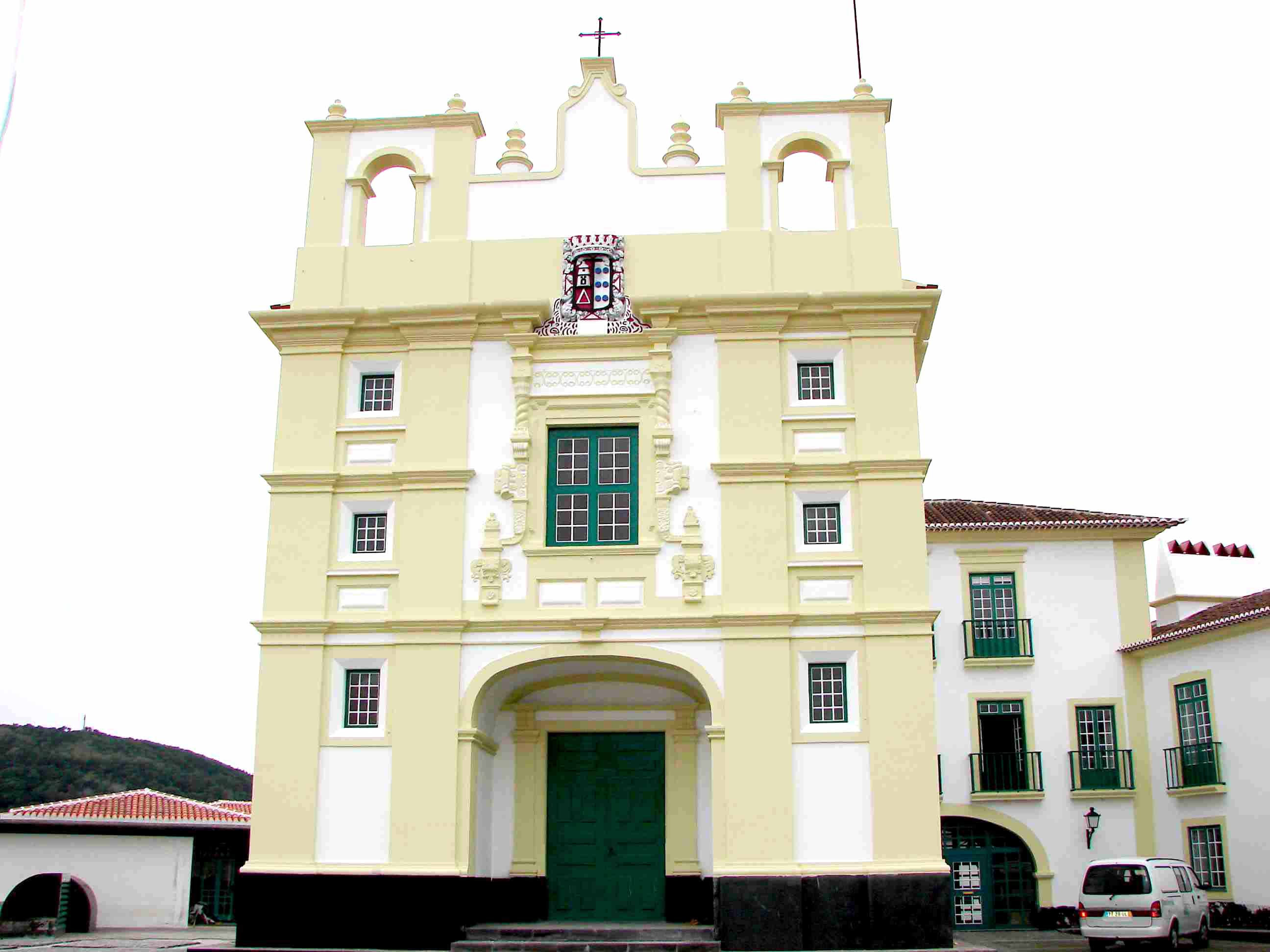
The elaborate chapel of Our Lady of Remedies

Built in the 16th century by Pero Anes do Canto, then nominated the first Provisionor-of-Arms in 1527, and which remained in the hands of his descendants until the 19th century. In addition to being a personal residence, it was the centre for the Provisioner-of-the-Armada, a body responsible for supporting the caravels and carracks that transited the Atlantic during the Age of Discovery. It is situated in the hilltop of Corpo Santo, permitting rapid access to the Porto de Pipas and Angra customshouse, with visibility of the bay of Angra.

His son, António Pires do Canto, who succeeded him in the post, erected the chapel around 1540. His grandson, Manuel do Canto e Castro (son of Pedro do Canto e Castro) promoted the first great alteration to the historical group, resulting in the great manorhouse that is today known as the Manor of Remédios. By the end of the century, his grandson (Manuel do Canto de Castro Pacheco) determined to rebuild the chapel, resulting in its current size and retaining the image of Nossa Senhora dos Remédios.

In the 18th century, the grandson of Manuel do Canto e Castro, Francisco Vicente do Canto e Castro Pacheco (1725-1809), initiated extensive work to conserve and restore the group. It was at that time the sculpted coat-of-arms of the family was erected on the manor. At the time of his death his property included valuable furniture, silver, porcelain or textiles.

At the end of the 19th century, following the death of Maria Luísa do Canto in 1890 and lacking any direct descendants, the group was seeded to Francisco do Canto e Castro, who sold the buildings in the beginning of the 20th century to the Irmandade de Nossa Senhora do Livramento, in order install the orphanage of Beato João Baptista Machado. This institution functioned in the buildings until the 1980 earthquake, when the buildings were damaged (including the Chapel of Remédios, which almost completely destroyed).

By agreement with the Irmandade, the Regional Government of the Azores obtained the property, initiating a program to restore and re-purpose the buildings. This included the construction of a wing to serve as the regional administrative service centre for health and social services, then run by the Secretaria Regional dos Assuntos Sociais (Regional Secretariate for Social Affairs), inaugurate in 1996. Work to the chapel was concluded in 1999.

The manor of Remédios and chapel annex were classified as a Property of Public Interest (dispatch 14/78, 14 March 1980, listed in the official journal of the Azores) and included in the historic classification for the city of Angra.

== Architecture ==
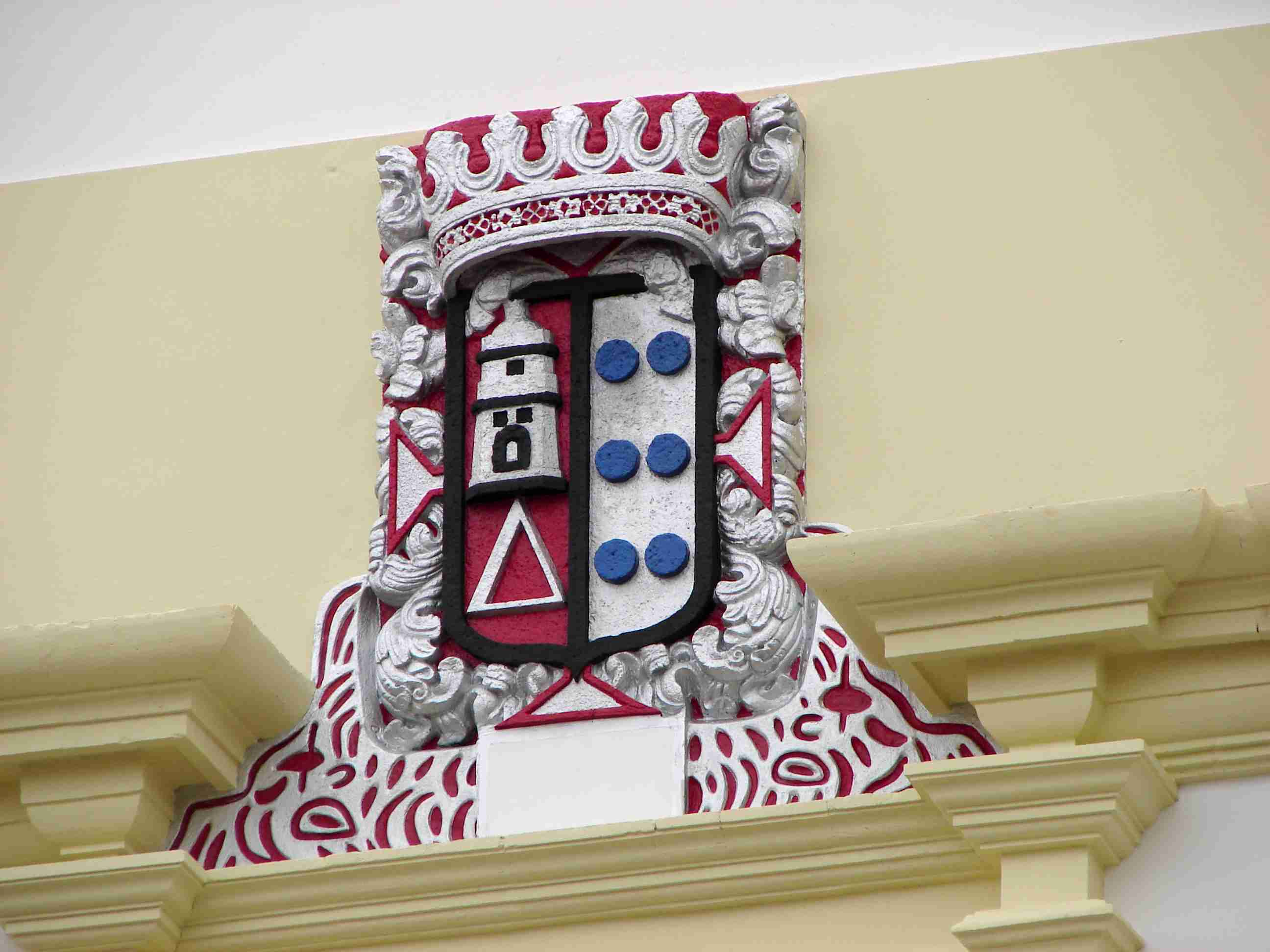
The ornate coat-of-arms of the Canto e Castro family, still retained on the structures.

The building experienced several remodelling projects and extensive alterations associated with the 1980 Azores earthquake, which resulted in major damage, in particular to the chapel annex.

Over the main doorway of the manorhouse are the coat-of-arms for the Canto e Castro family, the principal descendants and property-owners until the late 20th century.
