= Cais da Alfândega (Angra do Heroísmo) =

Wharf of the Customshouse Cais da Alfândega
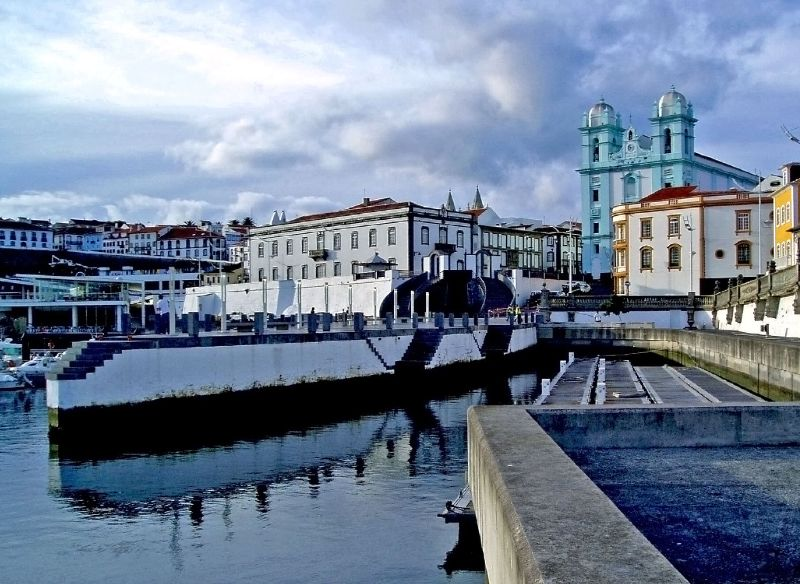
- A ground view of the marina and docks of Cais da Alfândega, showing the customshouse (left) and the Church of the Misericórdia (right)

Location
- Location: Sé, Angra do Heroísmo (Azores), Portugal
- Coordinates: 38.653681°N 27.218255°W

Details
- Owner: Câmara Municipal de Angra do Heroísmo
- Operator: Portos dos Açores
- Opened: 15th century
- Type: Wet dock/Marina/Docks

The Wharf of the Customshouse (Portuguese: Cais da Alfândega) is located on the edge of the Bay of Angra, in the civil parish of Sé, municipality of Angra do Heroísmo, on the island of Terceira, Portuguese archipelago of the Azores.

== History ==
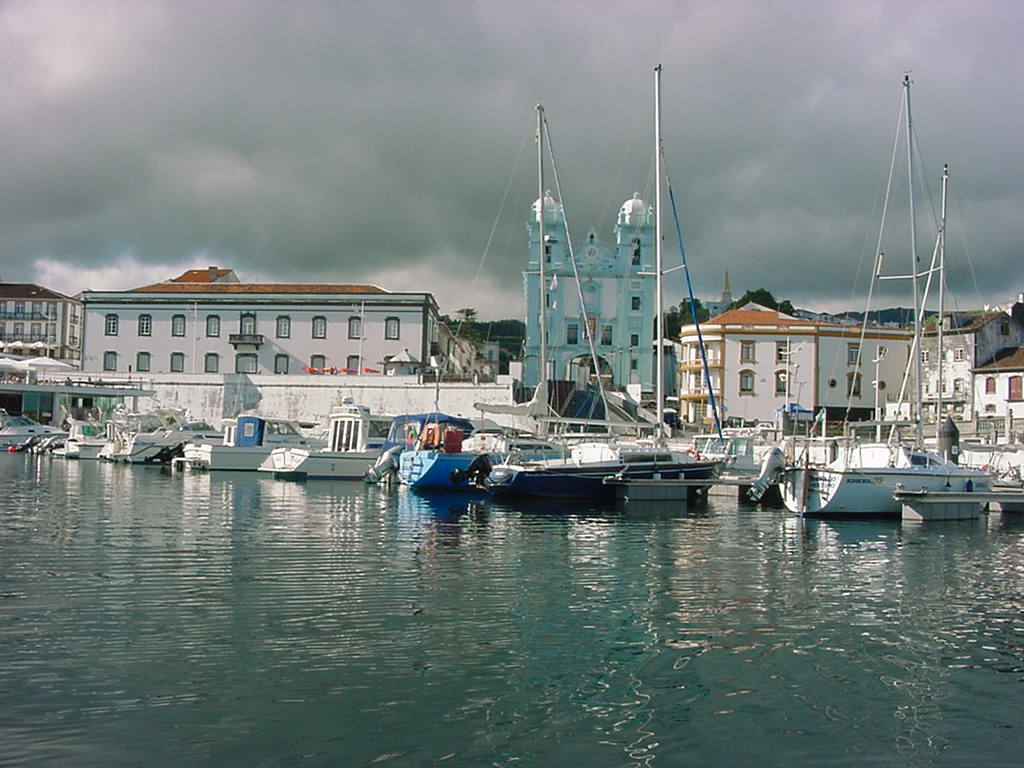
A view of the marina that now occupies the former Cais da Alfândega along the coast

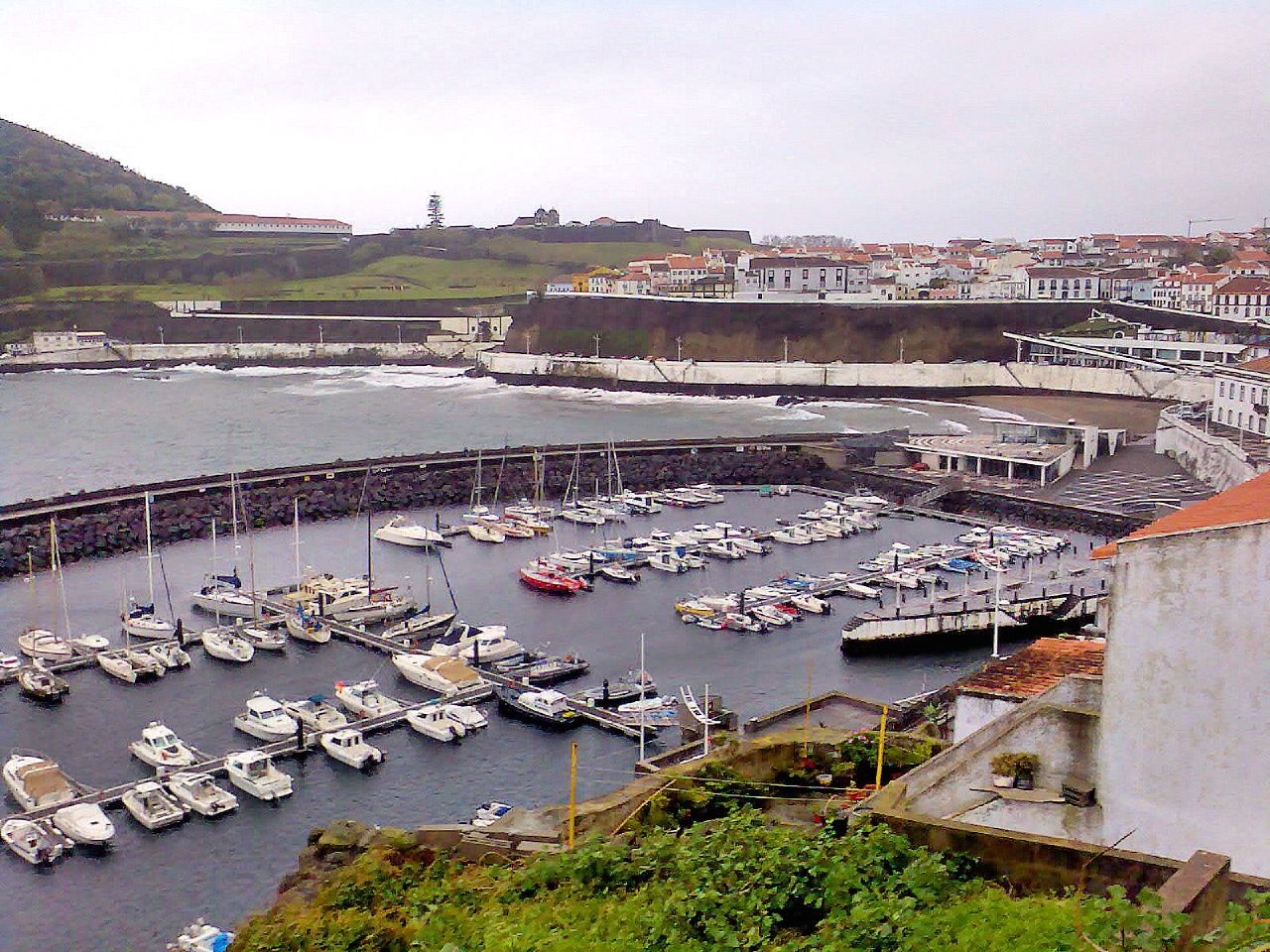
The modern marina and wharf constructed in the 20th century

The anchorage is the oldest wharf in Angra do Heroísmo, established after the first settlers began arriving between 1470 and 1500, at the time when Álvaro Martins Homem promoted its colonization. This wharf connected directly through the city gates to the Pátio da Alfândega (Customhouse's Patio/Veranda), the hospital of the Misericórdia (along the Rua de Santo Espírito) and the building from which goods were registered and warehoused for the town. Many of the boats that transited the waters of the North Atlantic passed through Angra on their way to and from the colonies of North and South America.

The oldest view of the old wharf was characterized in an engraving of the port around 1590, showing the anchorage alongside Monte Brasil. At that time, the ravine that flowed into the bay allowed naval repair, with its access along Rua de São João. Along Rua Direita a fortified passage existed that canalized the ravine's water to the port, where they supported naval ships.

For the following century little is known. It was the main hub for customs traffic, and the city gates acted as a symbol of the city's commercial authority. Repairs to the wharf were carried out in 1610, and the gates became a representation of the commercial power of the town, as it was an obligatory stop in trans-Atlantic traffic. The customhouse patio, which encircles the building in the east and south, helped businessmen, providing a line-of-sight to goods offloaded from shipping docked at the wharf.

The fortified gates also served as a protective structure since the middle of the 16th century, when it was integrated into the massive coastal defenses of Monte Brasil, along with the Fort of São Sebastião (to the east), the Fort of São Benedito and later the Fort of Santo António (to the west), which were ordered constructed by the Provisioner of Arms Pero Anes do Canto. The gate lasted 250 years, until an earthquake on 1 November 1755 (an aftershock of the 1755 Lisbon earthquake) caused a wave that inundated buildings until the old square (Portuguese: Praça Velha). The waters destroyed and dragged the structure.

Following the creation of the Captaincy-General of the Azores in 1766 (by King Joseph I), the first Captain-General, D. Antão de Almada, 12th Count of Avranches, ordered his lieutenant, Sergeant-Major João António Júdice to plan for the reconstruction of the wharf, while maintaining the elements of the existing structure. This was the second largest modification of the relationship between Angra and the sea; this resulted in the Baroque and Neoclassical construction, that included the expanded pátio that extended to the Rua Direita, linking it to the two large staircases in steel and surmounted by two stone gates. At the edge of the space was the recently constructed Church of the Miseriórdia, dating to 1746. The waterspouts that supported the ships, were transferred to the double lateral pillar fountain, at the centre of the staircase. A guard was maintained on the site, more for administrative reasons, then for defense, and the access gate in front of the Rua de Santo Espírito and square expanded; the sea gate, guardhouses and the rest of the structures were buried in order to build up the new construction.

By the 19th century, the first steamships began to port in the Bay of Angra, but owing to the depth of the cove, they were required to anchor offshore. It was at the wharf that on 3 March 1832, King Peter IV made shore, during the Regency of Angra, in order to gather forces in his attempt to ceded the crown of Portugal from his brother D. Miguel. During this time, the first work was begun on a road along the cliffs, to connect the downtown to various smaller agglomerations along the coast; this public avenue, allowed access to the sea from many points in the city, while the Pâtio was transformed, losing many of its arcades, while the fountain was substituted.

By 1930, the wharf lost much of its traditional use and was reserved as a marina, for ships transiting the waters of the Azores.

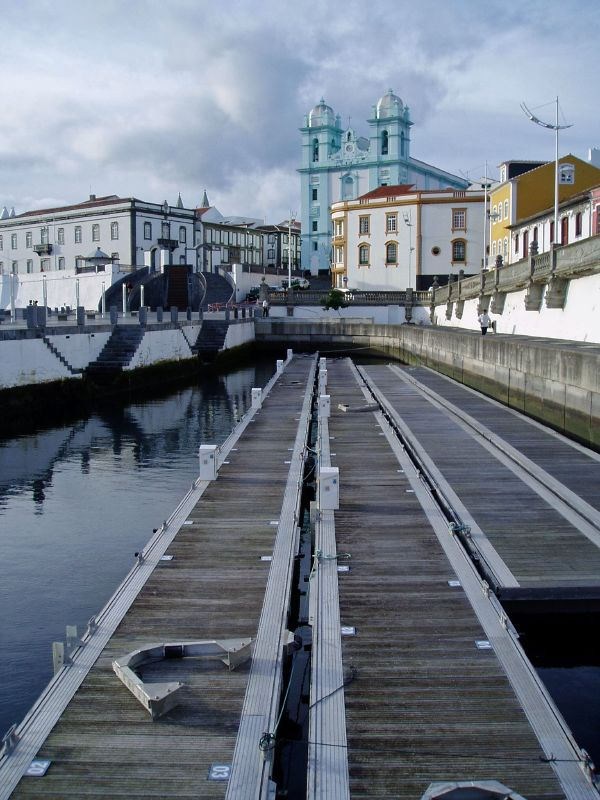
A view of the Pátio da Alfândega

In 1996, during public works to remodel the sewage and drainage system, excavations unearthed the primitive infrastructures of the old city, including the fortified bastions, pipes, and three level staircase, as well accumulated debris from preceding centuries.
