= Solar de D. Violante do Canto =

Manor of D. Violante do Canto
- Solar de D. Violante do Canto
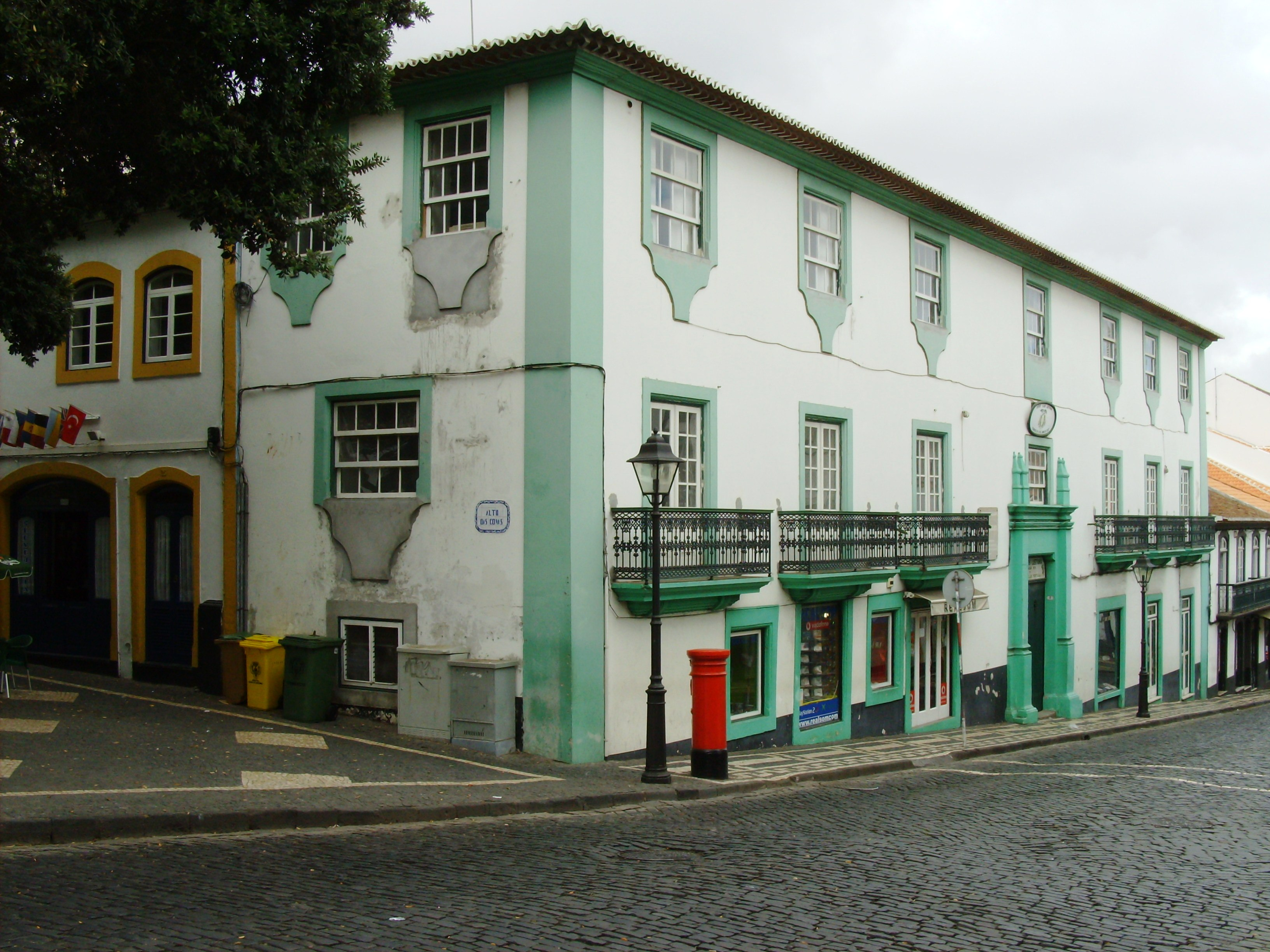

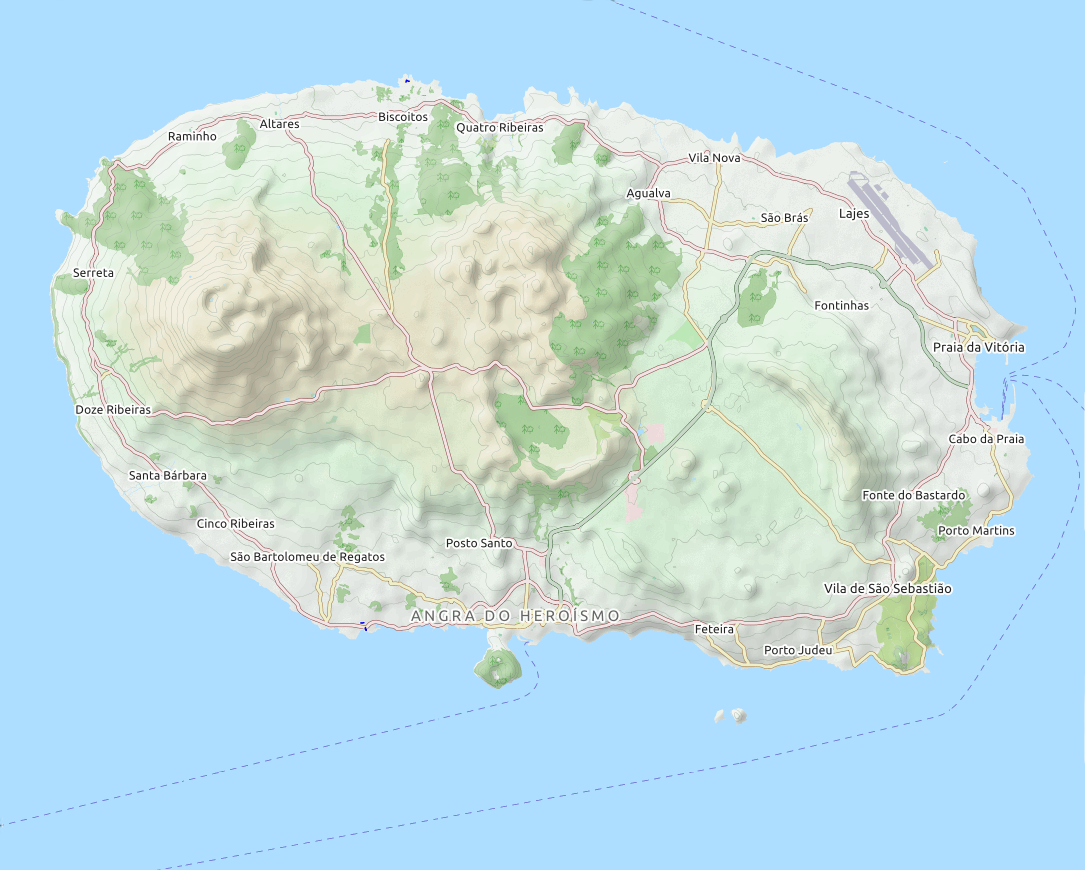
- Location of the manor in the municipality of Angra do Heroísmo

General information
- Type: Manorhouse
- Architectural style: Baroque
- Location: Sé, Portugal
- Coordinates: 38°39′17.9″N 27°12′56″W
- Opened: c. 16th-17th century
- Owner: Portuguese Republic

Technical details
- Material: Stone Masonry

The Manor of D. Violante do Canto (Portuguese: Solar de D. Violante do Canto), commonly known as the House of Dona Violante do Canto (Portuguese: Casa de D. Violante do Canto), is an urban manorhouse located in the civil parish of Sé, municipality of Angra do Heroísmo, in the Portuguese island of Terceira, archipelago of the Azores.

== History ==
The building was constructed sometime in the 16th century, as residence for D. Violante do Canto e Silva, heiress to the provisioner-of-arms. In the context of the 1580 Succession Crisis, after a visit by António, Prior of Crato (in his conflict with Philip of Spain for the Portuguese Crown) the Portuguese monarch thanked D. Violante for her support. Yet, in 1583, after the capitulation of the island and arrival in Angra by Spanish troops, the house was selected as the residence of the Marquess of Santa Cruz. D. Violante was taken to Spain, where she was obliged to marry Simão de Távora, from an important Portuguese family allied to the King of Spain.

Dr. Francisco Lourenço Valadão Júnior, secretary-general of the Civil Governor, order the installation (in 1940) of a plaque on the house to commemorate the second century of Portuguese independence.

In July 1962, the property was acquired by Sport Clube Lusitânia for 560,000 escudos, and paid-off by 1973 (through assistance of its members). It is the current headquarters of the regional football club and local chapter (14) of the Sporting Clube de Portugal (using its colours/kit), as well as a delegation in Toronto, Canada.

The building was classified as a Property of Public Interest under resolution 41/80 (11 June 1980), and included as part of the designated Historic Centre of Angra do Heroismo (resolution/article 57, subsection "a").

== Architecture ==
A former urban residence, the manor is fixed between buildings on right lateral facade and posterior. It is located on the edge of the city of Angra, adapting to the sloping roadway leading down to the town centre, alongside the trapezoidal-shaped square of Alto das Covas (an area of park benches and small garden). Around this building are familiar local landmarks, such as the Sé Cathedral of Angra, the Bettencourt Palace and the historic buildings of Carreira dos Cavalos.

The building is a simple, rectangular plan with three floors, plastered and painted in white, with corners and cornices trimmed in green. The main facade is oriented to the south, marked by a central portico framed and flanked by plinths, sectioned in half. Over the doorway are two square windows, flanked on both floors with framed windows, the third floor consisting of an irregularly design.

The interior grand salon, is decorated in paneled ceilings, with two sculpted coat-of-arms: one of the Canto and the other the Castro families.
