= Episcopal Palace, Angra do Heroísmo =

Coordinates: 38°39′16″N 27°13′17″W

Episcopal Palace
- Paço Episcopal
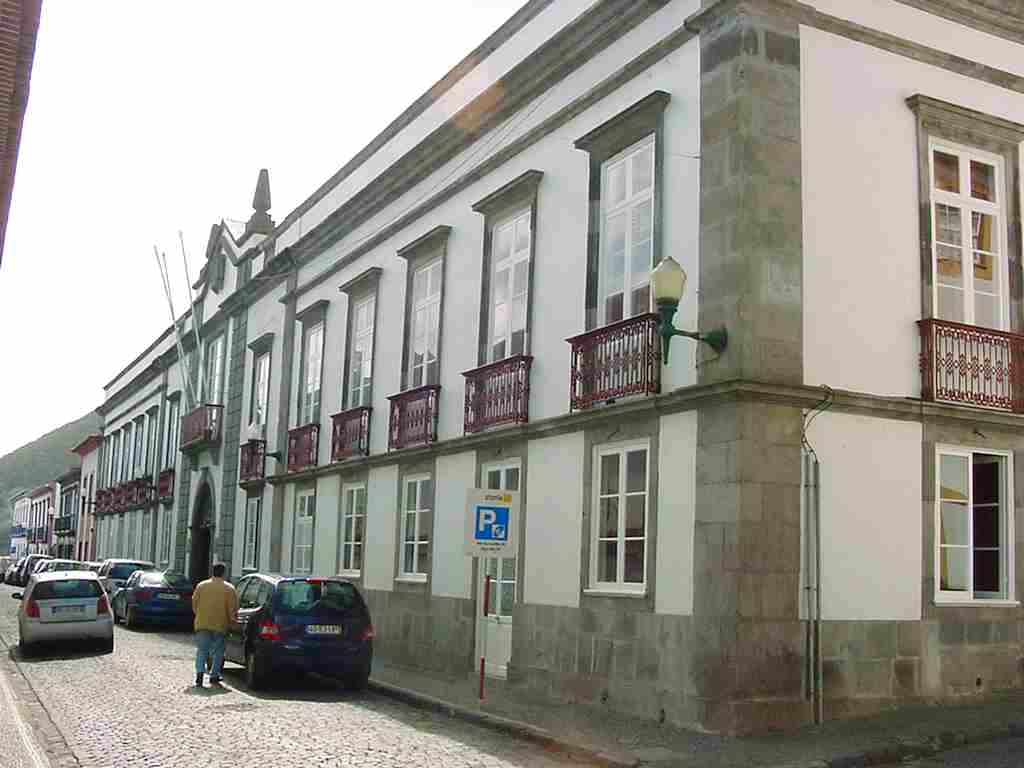
- Front facade of the episcopal palace
- Interactive map of the Episcopal Palace area

General information
- Architectural style: Medieval
- Location: Sé, Angra do Heroísmo, Portugal
- Opened: 16th century
- Owner: Portuguese Republic

Technical details
- Material: Basalt

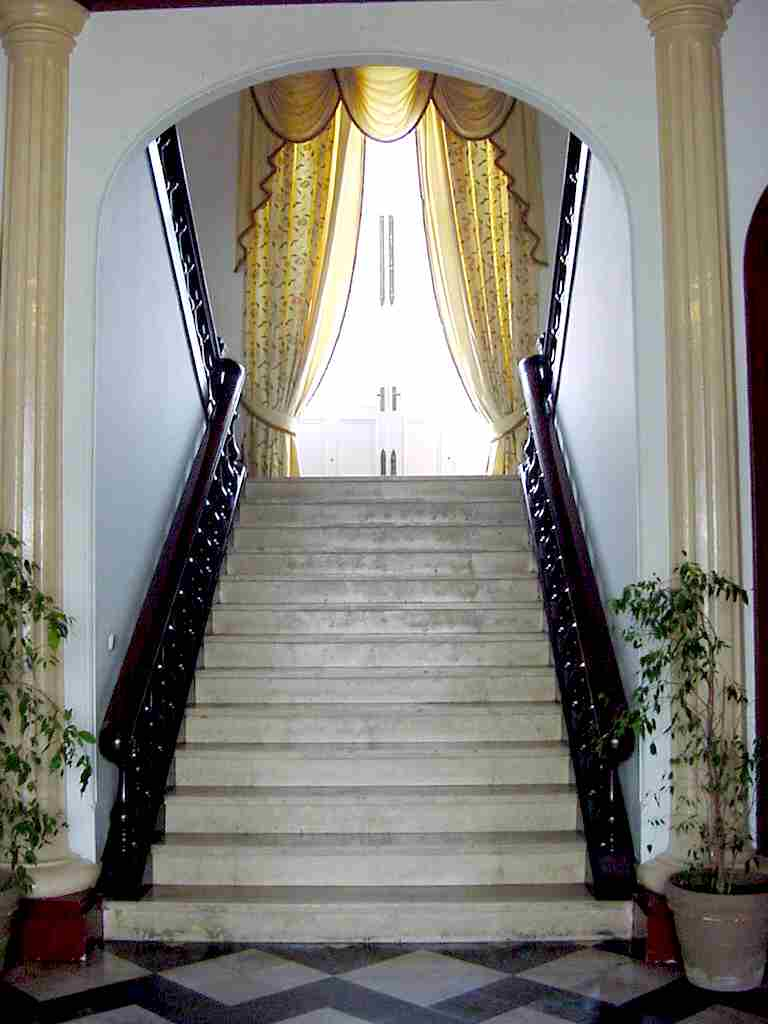
Access to the second-floor landing of the episcopal palace

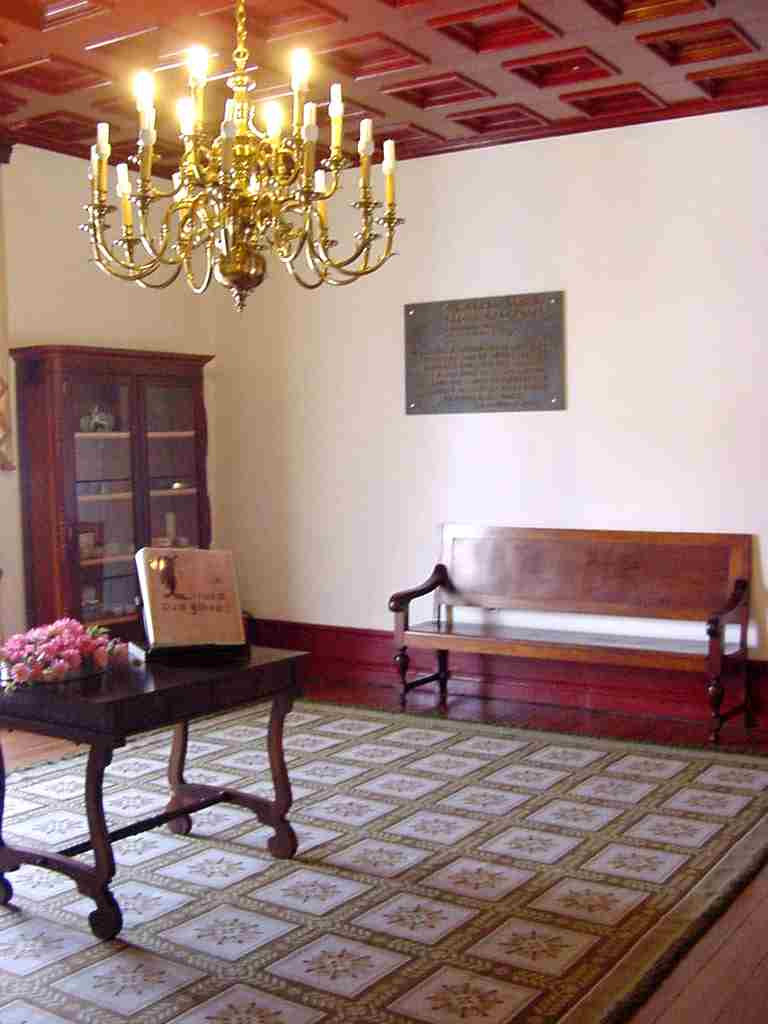
Second floor reception room of the episcopal palace

The Episcopal Palace (Portuguese: Paço Episcopal) is a 16th-century former-religious building situated in the civil parish of Sé, municipality of Angra do Heroísmo, on the Portuguese island of Terceira, in the archipelago of the Azores.

== History ==
On 3 November 1544, King John III ceded to the cathedral of Angra "para todo osempre" (forevermore) some houses and courtyards he owned. The properties were formerly rented by Francisco de Giberlião, which were exporpiated, owing to the debts he had; this included two residences, their chambers and kitchens, and one garden that faced the roadway, along horsetrack. These buildings were expanded an improved, especially along Aljube, including the entrance-ways, in order to serve as the ecclesiastical services. The local government committed an annual subsidy of 500$000 reis on 8 April 1603, for public works, to cover these projects, which were in excess of 2,700$000 reis.

Following the earthquake in Vila Franca do Campo, on 24 May 1614, the nuns of the monastery of Santo André were sheltered at the episcopal palace, then unoccupied.

Sometime during the 18th century, Bishop D. José Pegado de Azevedo ordered the erection of his coat-of-arms on the ceiling of visitor's reception area. Similarly, between 1727-1799, Bishop José de Avé Maria, enriched the oratory with paintings of São João da Mata, São Félix de Valois, São Raimundo de Penafort and other scenes from via sacra.

By the 18th-19th century, the residence included various halls on the main floor, including the main hall, where the prelates held audiences and held ecclesiastical examinations; the visitors hall, which was continuous with the main hall; a large dining room; and a chapel (or oratory), with a canvas featuring the a crucified Christ, framed with angels, instruments from the passion of Christ, silver crucifix, paintings of Saints Peter and Paul, the Assumption of Mary, and the Descent from the Cross, as well as the a painting of the Doctors of the Church and, over the entranceway, the Descent of the Holy Spirit. Around the buildings was a garden and vegetable garden, centred by a fountain, several chambers and coach-houses.

After 1832, the building ceased to pertain to the Diocese of Angra, and was occupied by the Junta Geral of the Autonomous District of Angra do Heroísmo.

On the morning of 31 July 1885, a fire erupted in the northern wing of the building, later referred to as an act of a criminal origin. The Bishop was absent at the time, staying at his summer residence (the estate of Imaculado Coração de Maria à Estrela), in the parish of São Pedro. But, parish priest, António Maria Ferreira, who was overnighting, was saved from the fire. Owing to the damage, the bishop moved his residence to the Palace of the Bettencourts. The bishop did not return, residing in 1900 the residence at Rua de D. Amelia, 74, and he also transfer the ecclesiastical secretariat to the building.

On the arrival of the new bishop, D. José Manuel de Carvalho (in November 1902), the residence returned to the palace, which had been restored. Until then there was a minor office of the ecclesiastical orders.

On 20 June 1910, D. José Cardoso Correia Monteiro, the last bishop who lived at the residence died. Two days later, the canons elected Monseigneur António Maria Ferreira as the principal vicar, who announced the vacancy of the Diocese (on 26 June) as part of the Republican revolution. This was point when republican sentiments began to influence the politics, resulting (a year later) in the confiscation of the ecclesiastical property in the Portuguese territory by the State, that included the former episcopal palace. In 1914, the Companhia da Junta Geral ao Estado purchased the property on which the palace was located.

On 19 September 1919, a new fire provoked the destruction of the interior.

In 1958, on the occasion of the visit of President Francisco Craveiro Lopes, a Portuense firm bought the property and proceeded to renovate the building. This remodeling permitted the eventual reuse of the spaces, and the site became the meeting place for the Presidents of France and United States, Georges Pompidou and Richard Nixon on their visits 13 and 14 December 1971.

The 1 January 1980 earthquake caused damage to the building, but it was eventually recuperated and services as the seat of the Direção Regional de Educção e Cultura (Regional Directorate for Education and Culture).

== Architecture ==
The buildings are roughly located near the Sé Cathedral of Angra, in an area known as Carreira dos Cavalos (road of the horses), named for the fact that annually, horses were paraded in this square.

The buildings includes a main structure, kitchen, garden and dovecote.

Along the centuries, the building underwent profound alterations, in a manner that only the original walls remain of the primitive building.
