= Convent of Nossa Senhora da Conceição (Angra do Heroísmo) =

- Convento de Nossa Senhora da Conceição
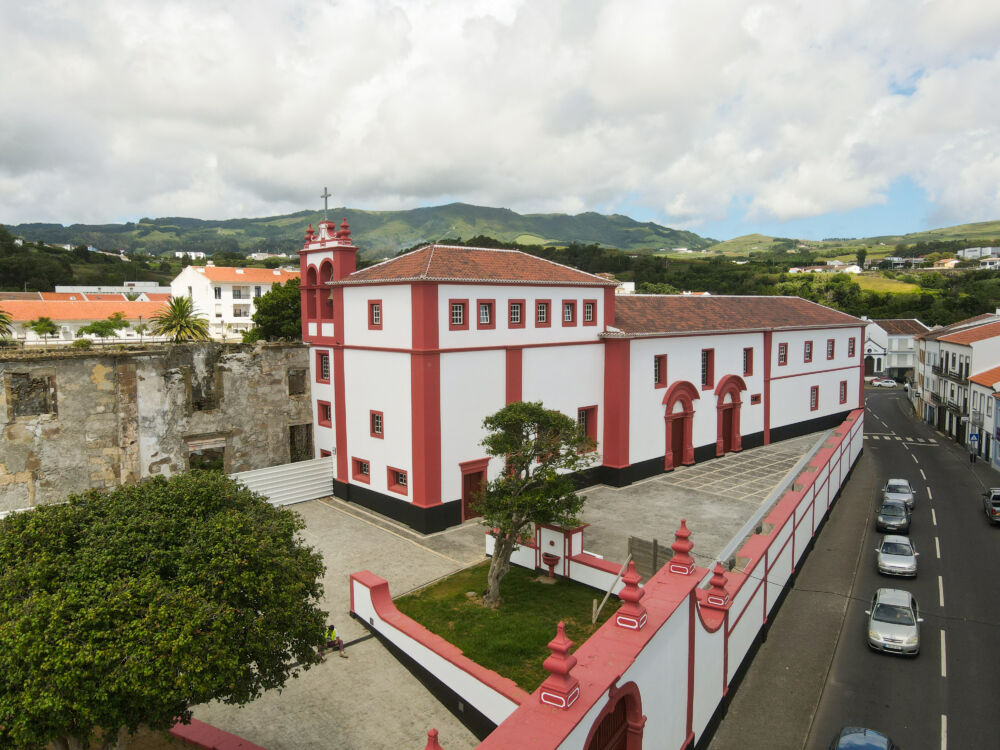
- A view of the convent and church of Nossa Senhora da Conceição in Angra do Heroísmo

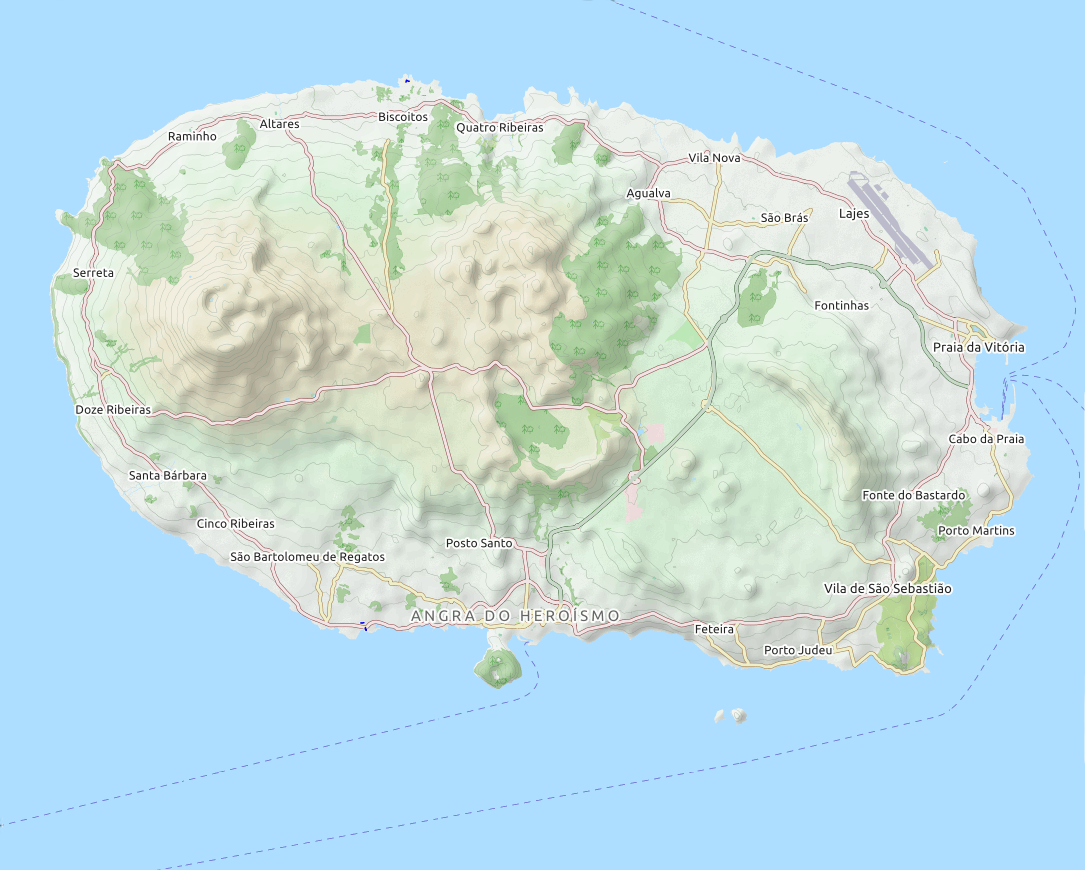
- Location within Terceira

General information
- Type: Convent
- Architectural style: Baroque
- Location: Sé, Angra do Heroísmo, Portugal
- Coordinates: 38.659173°N 27.212152°W
- Opened: 15th century
- Owner: Portuguese Republic

Technical details
- Material: Basalt

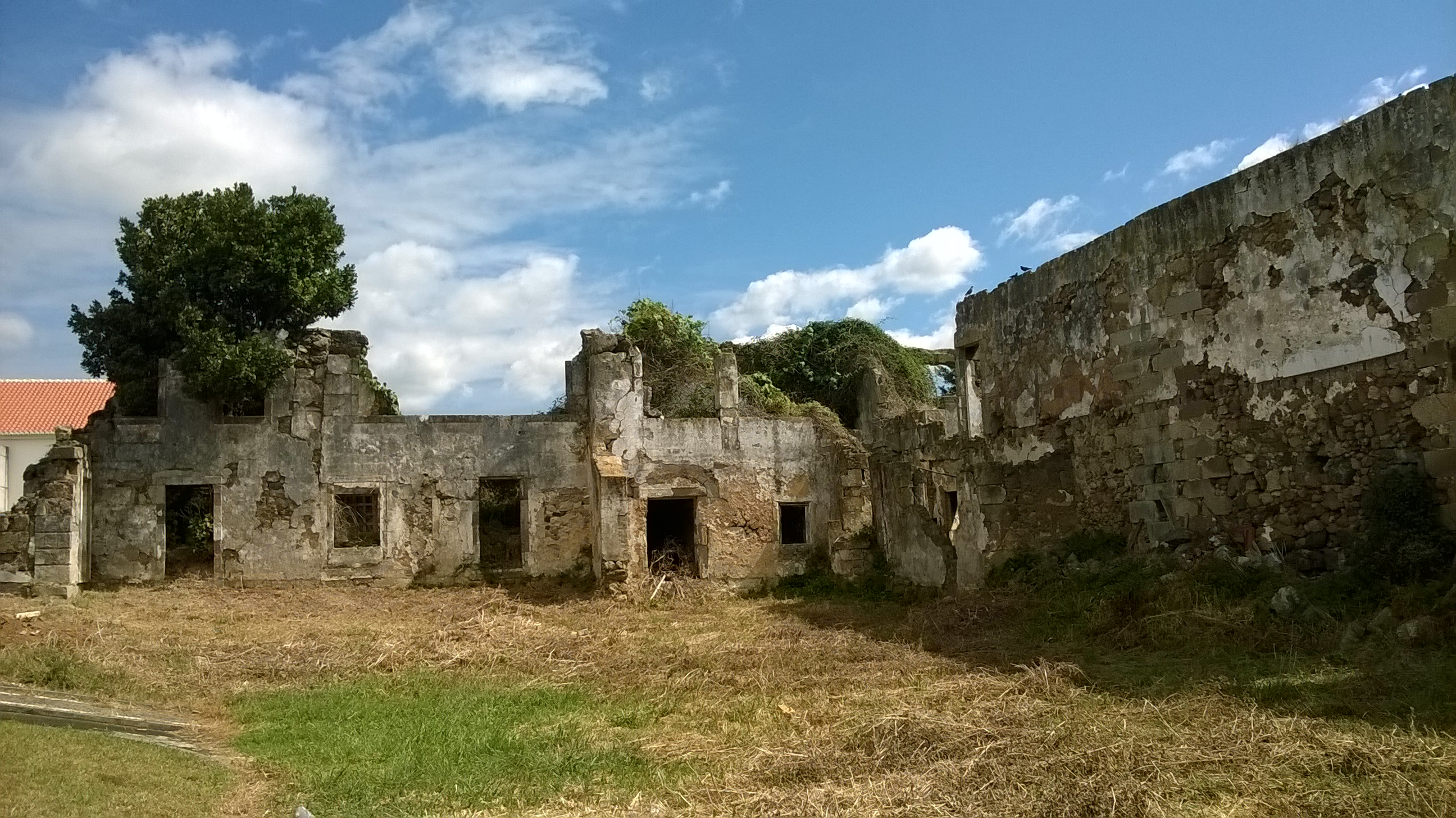
Convento n s da conceicao (3).jpg

The Convent of Nossa Senhora da Conceição (Portuguese: Convento de Nossa Senhora da Conceição/Convento das Concepcionistas) is a former convent situated in the civil parish of Sé, in the historic centre of the municipality of Angra do Heroísmo, in the Portuguese archipelago of the Azores.

== History ==
The Gracianos were initially installed at the site, establishing a hermitage around 1584, before moving to the more central location of Alto das Covas in 1607.

Pedro Cardoso Machado, third nephew of Gonçalo Eanes, bought the land and buildings at the site for 160,000 réis on 16 February 1606. An emigrant from the Spanish West Indies, Machado wished to return to the island of Terceira and found a convent for his sister, Simoa da Anunciação, making her an abbess for life. Encountering difficulties with the ecclesiastical authorities in Praia, he obtained a papal bull from Pope Paul V, on 5 August 1606, to establish the monastery for the Order of Our Lady of the Conception in Angra.

The convent began to operate on 11 April 1608, with nine nuns arriving on 13 April, and at its height the convent sheltered 63 nuns.

The Conceptionist convent was one of nine such monastic institutions on the island of Terceira, as later identified by Father António Cordeiro, in his História Insulana das Ilhas a Portugal Sujeytas no Oceano Occidental:

"The seventh convent, is commonly known as the Conceptionist Nuns' [convent], to distinguish it from the Clerics' Conceptionist College. It was this convent, whose stature and singular and perfect purpose they say, that in Portugal, there is only one similar in the east".

On 24 July 1830, Maria Josefa do Desterro was elected abbess, and became the last Conceptionist prelate in Angra. On 20 January 1832, the Regency of Angra ordered that the convent be cleared in order to transform the space into a military hospital. Pedro IV, by decree dated 2 April 1833, ceded the buildings to Santa Casa da Misericórdia, in order to install the Hospital de Santo Espírito, making the nuns orderlies and nurses. Following the abolition of the religious orders, and administrative reforms by the Marquess of Pombal, the remaining clergy from the Convent of Santo Espírito were transferred to the site in 1834.

The building was damaged during the events of the 1 January 1980 Azores earthquake. There were a number of projects at the site, but after 1984, many of them required the partial or complete preservation or restoration of the ruined structure. The regional government ultimately classified the ruins on 9 September 2004, including it in the historical classification for Angra.
