= Cathedral of Angra do Heroísmo =

- Cathedral of the Holy Saviour
- Catedral de Angra do Heroísmo
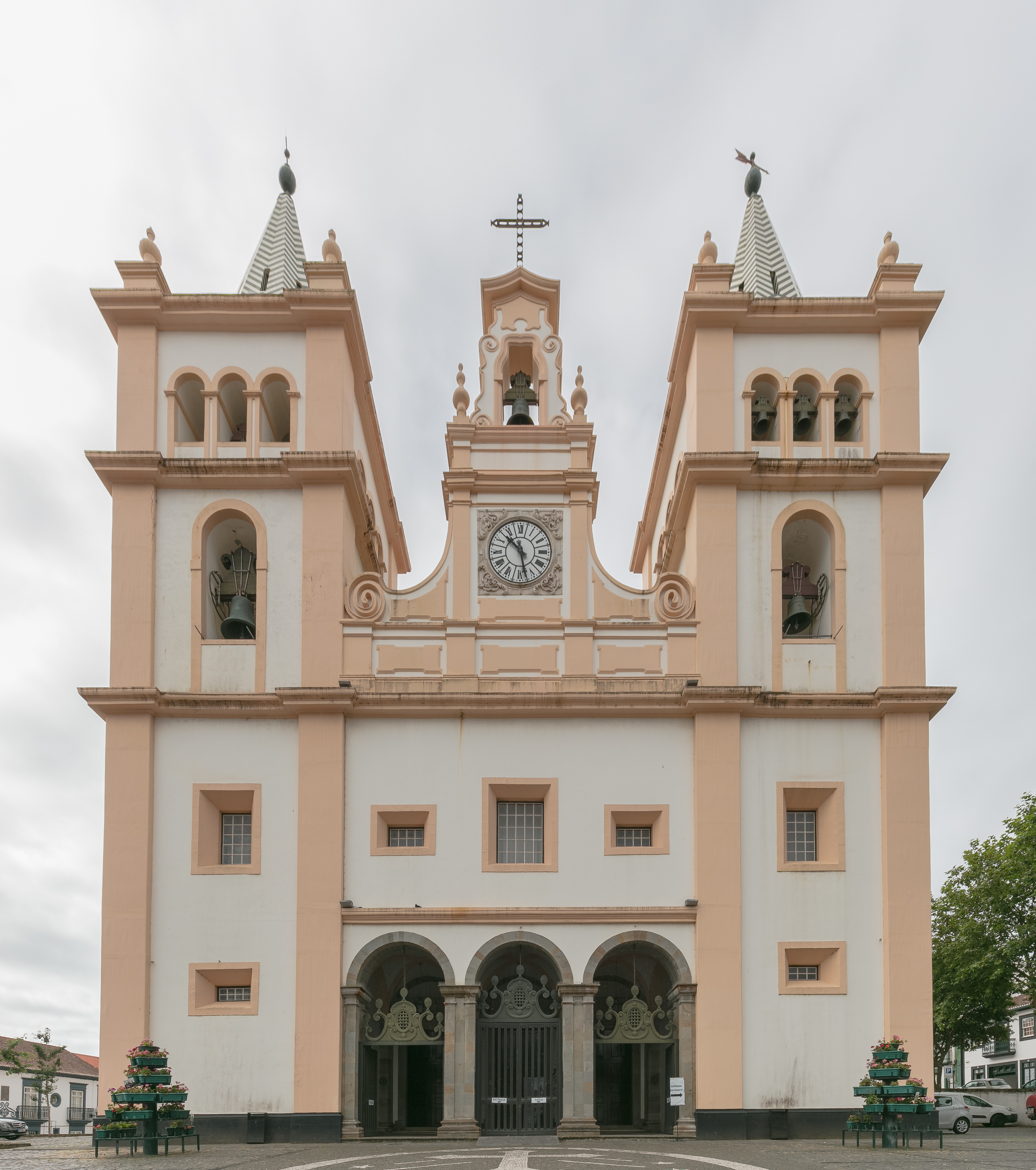
- The Sé Cathedral as it is located in the civil parish of Sé, Angra do Heroísmo

- Location of the palace in the municipality of Angra do Heroísmo
- 38°39′19.2″N 27°13′15.7″W
- Location: Terceira, Central, Azores
- Country: Portugal

History
- Dedication: Sé/Jesus Christ

Architecture
- Architect: Luís Gonçalves Cotta
- Style: Mannerist, Portuguese Chã

Specifications
- Length: 66.75 m (219.0 ft)
- Width: 43 m (141 ft)

Administration
- Diocese: Diocese of Angra do Heroísmo

The Cathedral of Angra do Heroísmo (Portuguese: Sé Catedral de Angra do Heroísmo) is a Portuguese 16th-century cathedral located in the civil parish of Sé, in the municipality of Angra do Heroísmo, on the island of Terceira in the archipelago of the Azores.

== History ==
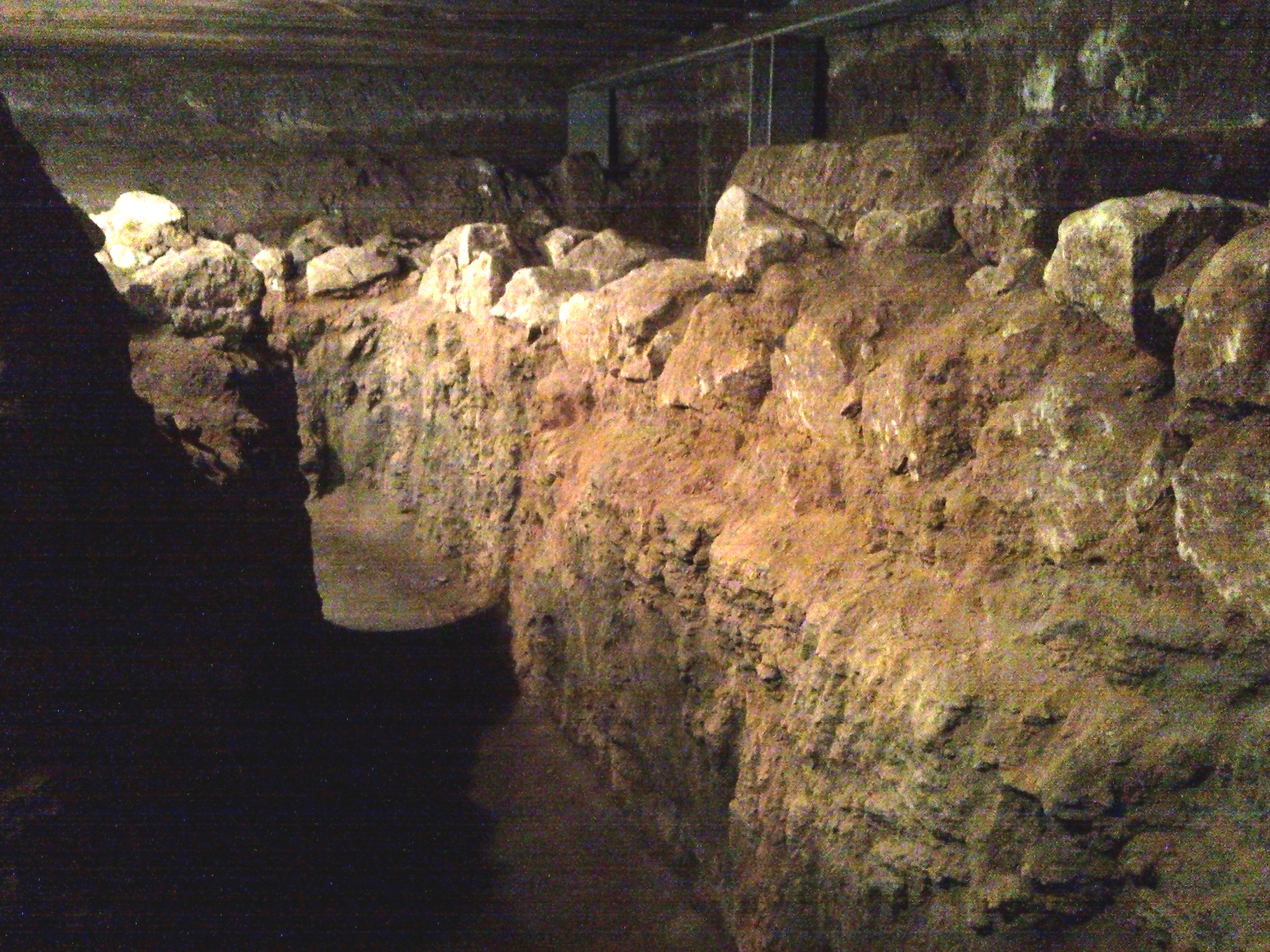
The catacombs under the cathedral

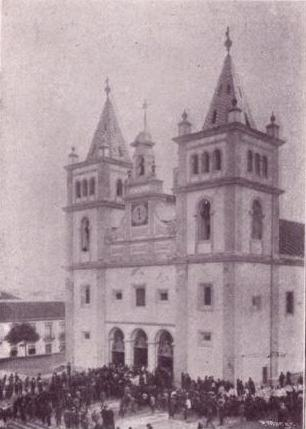
The cathedral and how it looked at the turn of the 20th century in Álbum Açoriano, fascículo nº 43, 1903, p.342

The cathedral remotes to the primitive church started by Álvaro Martins Homem in 1461, who dedicated it to the Holy Saviour (Portuguese: São Salvador), which was completed in 1496, that date that the first vicar was nominated. Little is known of this early temple.

The bishopric of the islands of the Azores was created on 3 November 1534, by Pope Paul III, designating the Church of São Salvador of Angra (Portuguese: Igreja de São Salvador de Angra) as the religious seat. With the growth of the local population and creation of the Bishopric of Angra, the municipal council formulated a petition to construct a new building for the local community. The first prelate of the new diocese was D. Agostinho Ribeiro who, arriving in 1535, encountered the small, old Church of São Salvador, which was incompatible with its functions as mother-church of the Azores. In 1536, the bishop in accordance with the original council, reminded John III of Portugal of the need to install a diocesan seat. Yet, the monarch did not address their petition, but rather reorganized the institution, resulting in a new petition in 1557, which stated the financial incapacity of the local residents to support the construction of the new building.

But, it took three decades before a royal decree would establish it as a cathedral, mostly through the influence of Nuno Álvares Pereira. Construction on the cathedral began on 10 January 1568, during the reign of the Cardinal-King Henry, the Crown took the decision to construct the new seat, paying all expenses. The crown opted to construct a new temple on the same site, expanding its overall size, encompassing a great portion of the centre of the city of Angra, delimited by the Rua da Sé, Rua Carreira dos Cavalos, Rua da Rosa and Rua do Salinas. For this project 3000 cruzados was budgeted annually from royal rights to woad on the island of São Miguel, as long as the construction lasted. The architect Luís Gonçalves Cotta travelled to Terceira to elaborate the Mannerist project, which was adapted successively in the Arquitectura Chã style, and adapted by other professionals, such as João de Carvalho. The responsibilities for the construction project was invested and integrated into the defences for the island of Terceira, which began in 1562 (and finally completed in 1683). The ceremony establishing the cornerstone occurred on 18 November 1570. The project began with the chapel, then extended to the naves of the main church, even as the old church remained active for the next few years, only broken by the Portuguese succession crisis of 1580.

Although the first master was Luís Gonçalves Cotta, the designer of the cathedral, whose plan was sent to the Cortes in 1568 (and later altered in 1572 by King Sebastian of Portugal), was never known. Although unclear, it was believed that designed by the same royal master involved in the construction of the cathedrals in Leiria, Portalegre and Miranda do Douro (several decades earlier). Regardless, one of the more involved designers was Jerónimo de Ruão, an Italiante designer, who was responsible for matriz Church of Fronteira, Church of the Convent of Luz (in Benfica) and the main altar and Royal Pantheon of the church of Santa Maria de Belem, in the Jeronimos Monastery.

On 20 May 1581, mason Manuel de Lima was paid 100$000 réis for his stonework. The project began with the principal facade, that included two bell towers (and clock later installed in 1782), principally to allow the space to be used while under construction.

On 14 October 1592, Manuel Martins substituted his father, Roque Martins, who was the principal carpenter on the project.

In 1589, bishop D. Manuel Gouveia bought an organ for the cathedral.

From the beginning of the 17th century Luís Gonçalves Cotta worked on sculptures and stonework of the cathedral. But, on 27 February 1608, Luís Mendes was listed as the master mason, followed on 20 September 1633, by Bartolomeu Fernandes and on 3 September 1653, António Rodrigues Madeira. Along the sides of the interior, the craftsmen constructed four chapels, with funds from church brotherhood and community donations. At the beginning of the 17th century, the cloister, which served as a cemetery in the 19th century, was constructed. This space would disappear during the decade of the 1950, giving rise to the cathedrals simplified design facing the Rua da Rosa. In the 18th century, to the rear of the cathedral, the Grand Sacristy and Hall of the Ecclesiastical Tribunal was constructed.

The last of the exterior works were completed around 1618, and then continued in its interior (such as the gilding and decorating of the chapels). Along the sides of the interior, the craftsmen constructed four chapels, with funds from church brotherhood and community donations. At the beginning of the 17th century, the cloister, which served as a cemetery in the 19th century, was constructed. This space would disappear during the decade of the 1950, giving rise to the cathedrals simplified design facing the Rua da Rosa. In the 18th century, to the rear of the cathedral, the Grand Sacristy and Hall of the Ecclesiastical Tribunal was constructed.

Sometime in the 18th century, an organ by Joaquim António Peres Fontanes was installed, which disappeared in a fire. This organ was originally destined for a church in Macau, but the ship carrying the organ wrecked during a storm in the area. Bishop friar João Marcelino requested that Queen Maria I of Portugal gift the organ to the Sé. The temple was reconsecrated in 1808. In 1854, a new organ was executed by Father Joaquim Silvestre Serrão and João Nicolau Ferreira.

During the Portuguese Liberal Wars (1828-1834) the Te Deum was celebrated at the cathedral, by both royalist and liberal forces. In 1829, the Junta Provisória (Provicional Junta) collected all the silver and church bells (except those required for service) securing them in the Casa da Moeda in the Fort of São João Baptista, to produce 80 réis malucos. As a result of these actions, the church lost all its smaller bells and many of its historic silver decorations, except the front panel of the altar.

The churchyard, with staircase to the Rua da Sé was repaired in 1845 towards Rua do Salinas.

The tribal king Gungunhana and his fellow exiles were baptized at the cathedral on 16 April 1899, by the bishop of Angra, D. Francisco José Ribeiro de Vieira e Brito, assisted by many of the principal notables of the island.

The 1980 earthquake caused extensive damage to the building. Even as restoration work continued on the cathedral, on 25 September 1983, one of the bell-towers was destroyed. Two years later, on 25 November 1985, a great fire destroyed the gilded carpentry of the altars, the organs and the framed ceiling decorations. These catastrophes resulted in a large loss of artistic artifacts from the Baroque, although it was possible to rebuild the temple and continue its religious importance to the Azores.

It was classified as a Regional Monument, under resolution 41/80 (11 June 1980), included as part of a group of buildings comprising the historic centre of Angra do Heroísmo, under article 10 and 57 of the Regional Legislative Decree 29/2004/A, dated 24 August 2004 and approved on 9 September 2004, as a resolution-in-council 126/2004.

In the late part of the 20th century, a statue of Pope John Paul II was erected to mark the papal visit to the islands of the archipelago, and specifically his passage on 11 May 1991.

== Architecture ==
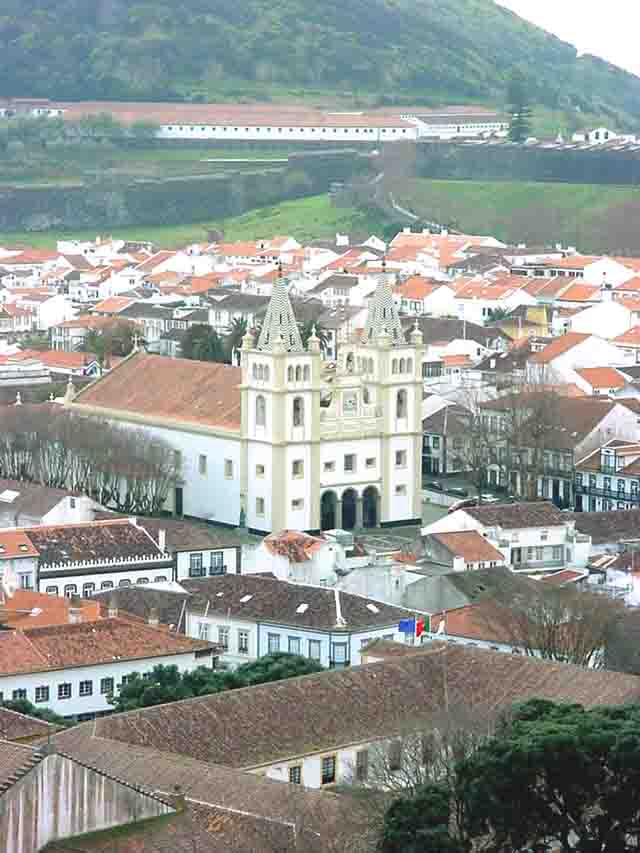
A view of the cathedral surrounded by the Rua da Sé, Rua Carreira dos Cavalos, Rua da Rosa and Rua do Salinas, resulting from its location on the edge of Angra do Heroísmo

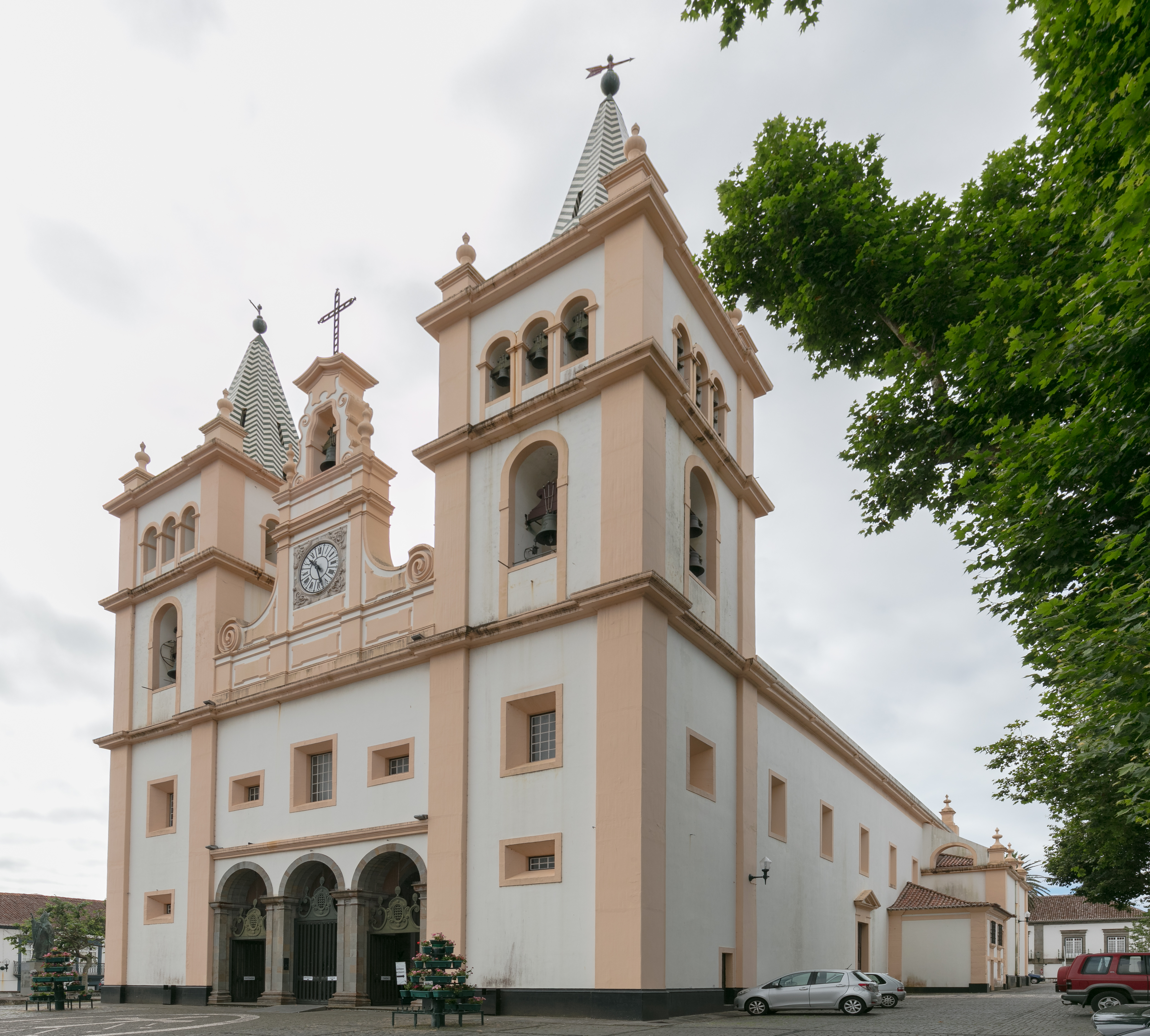
The front facade of the Cathedral showing the simple Portuguese Chã style design

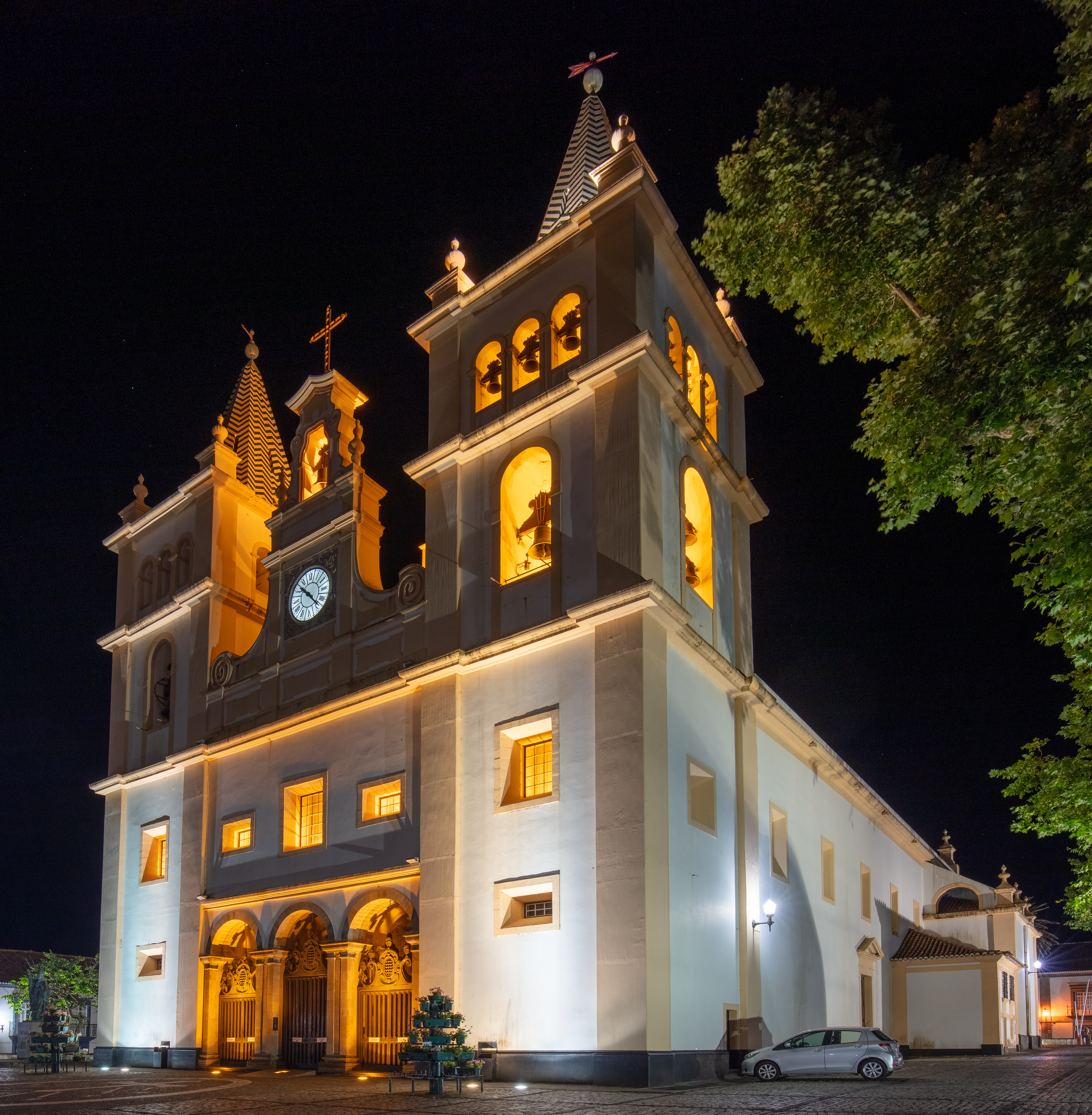
Vista nocturna

Located in the central part of the historic centre of Sé, the cathedral is the largest religious institution in the archipelago. The Sé Cathedral is part of the Arquitectura Chã movement. More than a style, it permeated from the middle of the 16th century to the beginning of the 18th century, as part of the Escola Portuguesa de Arquitectura e Urbanism (Portuguese School of Architecture and Urbanism). Its simplified and utilitarian design aesthetic was heavily influenced by the post-Manueline religious paradigm at the time.

The church is oriented towards to the north, rather than east, as was the historical tradition to orient medieval religious buildings towards Jerusalem or sunrise. At that time, lands were donated by Estevão Cerveira Borges, but owing to the lack of space when the construction began at the end of the 16th century, the axis of the church was oriented toward the north.

Its facade is symmetrical and harmonious, consisting of twin bell-towers, each with two orders of bells (32 bells in total). The cathedral is a broad church that includes three covered-naves, without a transept, three chapels and covered absinthe supported by Doric columns. Access to the temple is made through a three-arcade portico with fixed bronze panels. To the right is a commemorative plaque dedicated to the visit of Pope John Paul II, who was the first pope to visit the Azores, and celebrated mass on 2 May 1991. On the left of the portico is another plaque marking the construction of the cathedral following the 1980 earthquake: À reconstrução deste Catedral depois do Terramoto de 1 de Janeiro de 1980 e da sua bênção pelo Cardeal Patriarca de Lisboa, ocorrida no dia 3 de Novembro de 1985, sendo na altura Bispo de Angra D. Aurélio Granada Escudeiro. (The reconstruction of this Cathedral after the Earthquake of 1 January 1980 and the blessing by Cardinal Patriarch of Lisbon, occurred on 3 of November 1985, during the time of Bishop of Angra D. Aurélio Granada Escudeiro). This main entrance is protected by a glass windbreak which was inaugurated in 1996. To enter the building, the visitor is required to use the doorway to the left of the windbreak, which permits access to the Holy Sacramento (Portuguese: Santíssimo Sacramento).

The cathedral has four groups of bells: in the centre of the frontispiece there are two bells (linked to the clock); in the eastern tower, there are four bells for services; in the western bell-tower there 19 bells that form the carillon; and fronting the Rua da Rosa, three bells. The four bells in the eastern tower date between 1714 and 1984: on this first level a large 1 kilogram (2.2 lb) bell, which only functions when the Bishop officiates in the Sé. The oldest bell is inscribed with Depaire Virgini A Conceptione Dicatum, Lucas Roiz Palavra Fect Anno 1714, l de 6, with an image in bass-relief of Our Lady of the Conception. At the same level, toward the Rua do Salinas, is the missal bells, with the inscription Fundição de Sinos de Rio Tinto de H. M. da Costa, Porto, 1984, with an image of Our Lady of the Conception without crown and with cross, referring to 450 commemoration of the creation of the Diocese of Angra (when the Sé was preparing to reopen follow the 1980 earthquake). Still on the eastern tower, on a secondary level are two small bells, that are used during feast days and during Sunday services. On the grating fronting the Rua da Sé is a Latin cross with the inscription: Francisco Rodrigues Bella o fez em Lisboa no anno de 1834. On the small bell fronting the Rua do Salinas, is carved: J.M. Pereiras, Ponta Delgada, 1918., with similar Latin cross. Another group of bells are located in the southern arcades of the churchyard, facing the Rua da Rosa, alongside the old Sé clock. Cracked, these bells are not in service. The large bell, has a Latin cross in bass relief with two inlaid circles, with the inscription: Faustino Alves Guerra o fez em Lisboa no anno de 1782 and Francisco Rodrigues Bellas o fez em Lisboa no anno de 1843 (that includes the doves symbolizing the Holy Spirit and two bronze circles). The third bell has no inscription. In the central steeple of the frontispiece are two new bells that chimes the time with the clock. Installed in 2005, at the expense of the parish of Sé, they are inscribed with the phrase: A fundição de sinos de Braga. Senfim da Silva Jerónimo, Braga. Ano de 2005. On the western bell-tower are the 19 bells of the carillon, representing the municipalities of the region of the Azores, which was installed in the last month of 2010. The first and largest bell represents Angra do Heroísmo, and has the image of São Salvador, inscribed with: Nos 475 anos da criação da Diocese de Angra e nos 25 anos da reabertura desta Catedral após o terramoto de 1980. At this register, oriented towards the Rua Carreira dos Cavalos is the four great bells representing the four principal cities of the archipelago: Ponta Delgada, Ribeira Grande, Praia da Vitória and Horta. On the second register of the small belfrey (towards the Rua da Carreira dos Cavalos) are the bells representing the three more populous towns: Lagoa, Vila Franca do Campo and Povoação. In front, towards the interior, are the towns of medium dimension: Madalena do Pico, Vila do Porto, and Velas. Towards the Rua da Sé, on the last register are the bells of the smallest population centres: Lajes do Pico, Nordeste, Santa Cruz da Graciosa, Calheta, São Roque do Pico, Santa Cruz das Flores, Lajes das Flores and Vila do Corvo. All these bells are inscribed with their names, the islands from which they origin and the patron saint of their respective municipalities in bronze. This arrangement was financed by the municipal council of Angra, which covered 50% of the cost and the parish of São Salvador da Sé, while the remaining was contributed by the 18 remaining municipalities within the Diocese of Angra. Manufacture and installation of the bells was completed by Fundição de Sinos de Braga de Serafim da Silva Jerónimo. A concert was held on the evening of 24 December 2010, in the churchyard of the Sé, under the supervision of the Director do Coral Catedralício, Dr. Duarte Gonçalves da Rosa, after the benediction of the nine bells, by the Bishop of Angra, D. António de Sousa Braga, with the presence of the municipal president of Angra do Heroísmo, Dra. Andreia Cardoso, as well as other dignitaries from the other municipalities of the Azores.

=== Interior ===
The baptistery is a fundamental part of the temple, and used throughout the centuries by local Angrenses of Sé, including Beato João Baptista Machado, who was martyred in Japan around 1610. In addition to the historic baptismal fountain, over the space are tiles from Mannerist school, representing the Circumcision of Jesus and the Adoration of the Magi.

At the end of the lateral nave, there is the access to the belfry and old high-choir, which are surmounted by tiles representing the Last Supper and the Holy Trinity. The old high-choir, which is over the entrance windbreak, is the location of the pipe organ, installed in 1994 by the Micaelense, Dinarte Machado.

==== Chapels ====
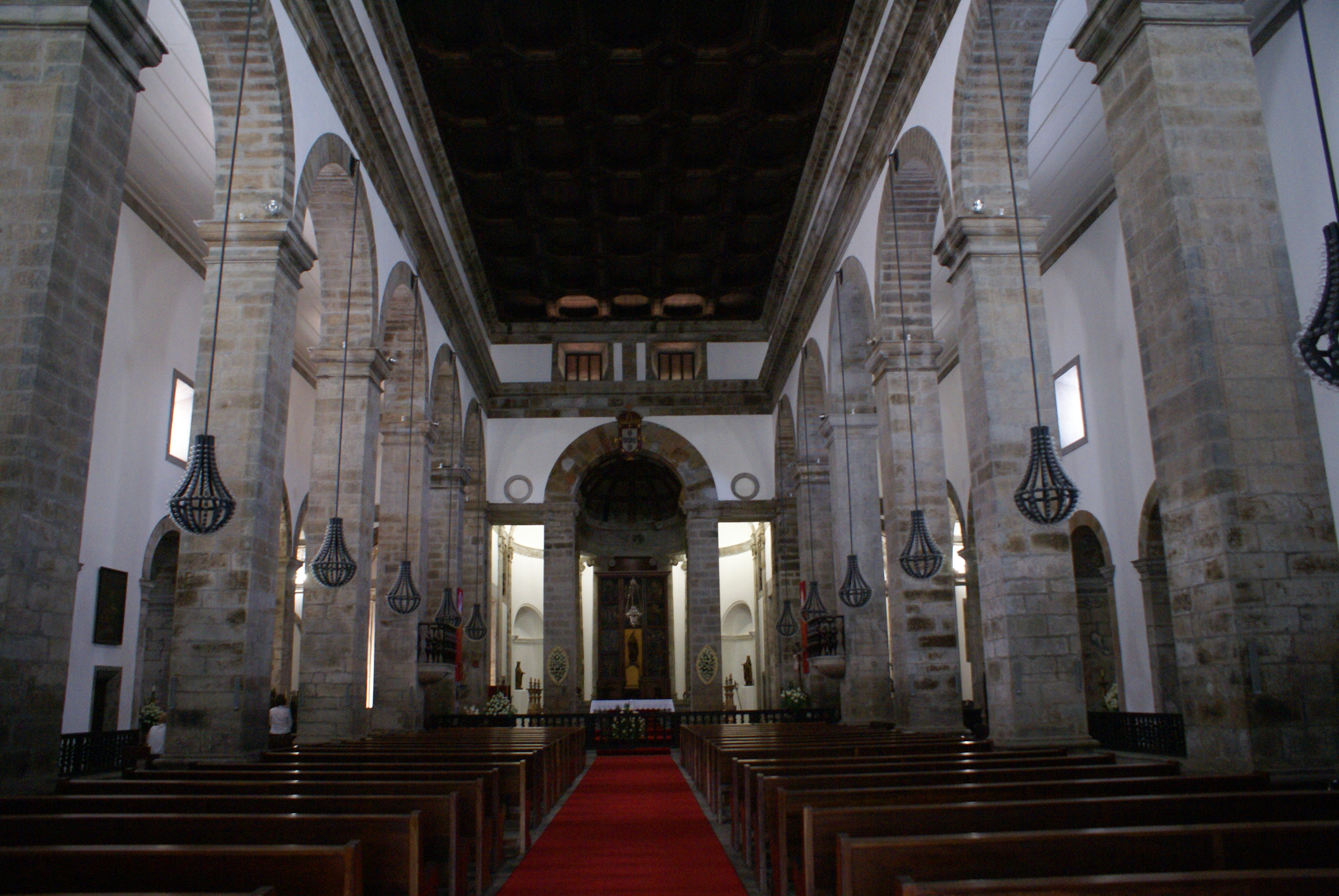
The nave of the Sé Cathedral showing the pillars of the central triumphal arch

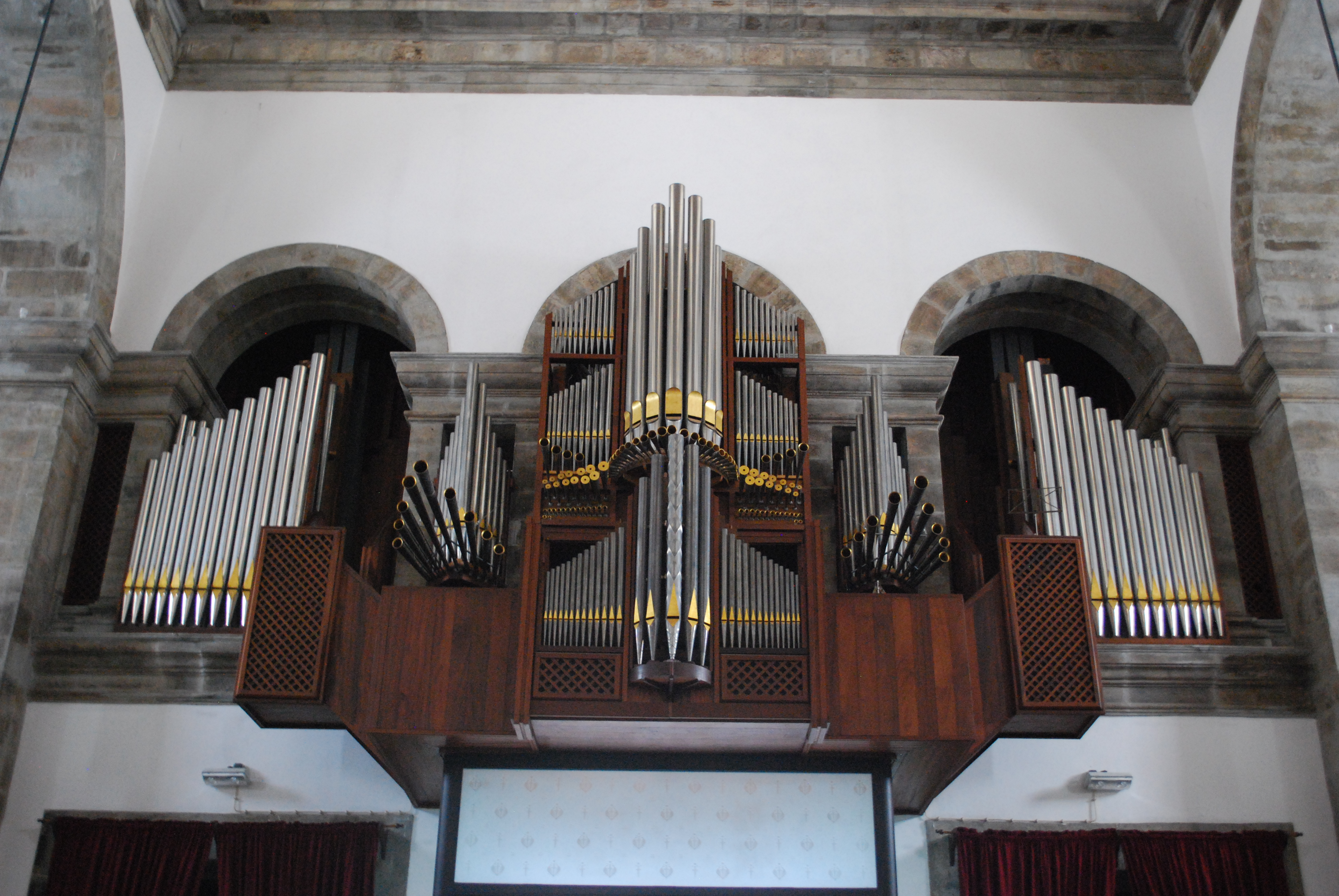
The high-choir and pipe organ located over the windbreak/entrance

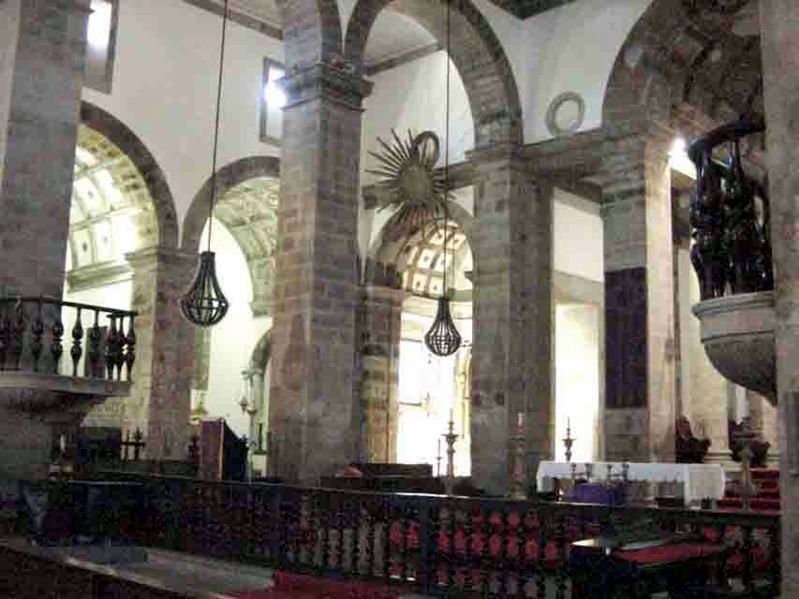
The nave, showing the pillars and latteral corridors leading to the chancel

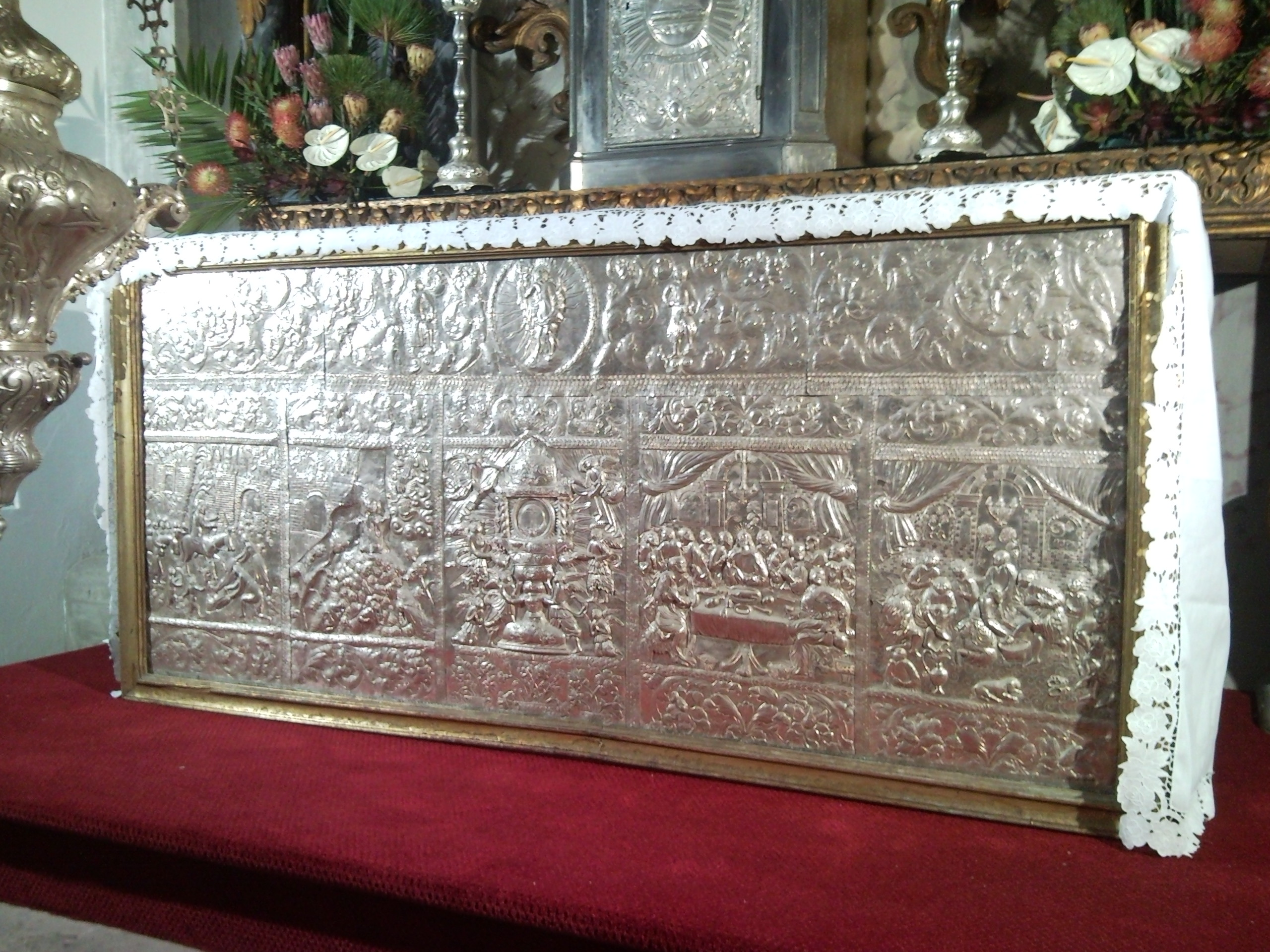
The silver-plated altar located within the retable

The Altar das Almas (Altar of Souls) was erected in 1640 by the Irmandade das Almas (Brotherhood of Souls), under the direction of canon Leonardo de Sotto Mayor (died in 1653). This altar has an allusive tile depicting the salvation of souls, and representing the Holy Trinity, Virgin Mary and Saint Dominic. At the Altar da Nossa Senhora dos Anjos (Altar of Our Lady of Angels) is the image of Nossa Senhora da Conceição (Our Lady of the Conception) dated to the 17th century, which was transplanted from the old Convent of São Francisco da Praia. This move was a gift of the second Count of Praia da Vitória, Jácome de Ornelas Bruges de Ávila Paim da Câmara, during the festivities associated with the feast of the Immaculate Conception first celebrated in 1854.

The Chapel of Senhor Jesus dos Aflitos (Lord of the Afflicted) was derived from the first temple established by Diogo Álvares Vieira and his wife Beatriz Anes Camacho, and today is the location of the tomb of Francisco Dias do Carvalhal, the founder and prominent figure in the history of Angra from the 16th century. On the altar of this chapel is a group of sculptures representing Christ in Calvary, the Virgin Mary and alternately Saint John, which were ordered from Lisbon by Bishop D. António Vieira Leitão in 1706.

The Chapel of Nossa Senhora do Rosário (Our Lady of the Rosary) was founded by the ancient Brotherhood of the Rosary (Portuguese: Irmandade do Rosário), that came from the older temple and altar of the Sé church. In 1948, this chapel was the resting-place for the image of Our Lady of Fátima that travelled the archipelago, but today is the location of images of Saint Joseph and the Sacred Heart of Jesus, acquired by the faithful in 1920.

The Chapel of the Santissima Sacramento (Holy Sacrament) is the holiest place in the cathedral, founded by the oldest Brotherhood of Sé, the Irmandade do Santíssimo Sacramento, which is still active in the community. The chapel hosts a silver tabernacle that dates to the beginning of the 18th century, and which was saved from the 1829 government confiscation of religious reliquary by the Brotherhood, whom paid cash to save the artifact. While some of the artifacts are still on display, the remainder of the Sé content is found in the Treasury.

The Chapel of Nossa Senhora de Lurdes (Our Lady of Lourdes) was constructed by the Canto e Castro family, and is the resting-place of Pero Anes do Canto (who died in 1556), Master-at-Arms and empersarial responsible for the cultivation of Verdelho wines in the archipelago, flanked by the crests of the Cantos and Castro families. The devotion to Our Lady of Lourdes was established by Monseigneur Canon Ferreira, in 1891, the first feast day in Portugal to celebrate the Marian apparition in Lourdes.

The Chapel of Santo Estêvão (Saint Stephen) was instituted by Estevão Cerveira Borges, a noblemen responsible for the donation of lands for the construction of the church in 1570. This chapel includes an image of martyred Saint Stephen, in the vestments of a deacon, and a coral rosewood bookcase inlaid with ivory, that was transferred from the Convent of São Francisco in Angra do Heroísmo.

The Chapel of São Pedro ad Vincula (Saint Peter in Chains) was established by Canon Luís de Almeida (who died in 1631) who embellished and decorated it until his death: a tombstone marks the founders marker. Within the chapel, in 1604, a commemorative plaque was mounted to mark the 400 years of the Irmandade de São Pedro Ad Vincula dos Cléricos Pobres (Brotherhood of the Chains of Saint Peter of the Poor Clerics). A Baroque image of São Pedro das Cadeias (Chains of Saint Peter) is the centerpiece of this altar, along with a Rosewood grade, and its artifacts, along with the sacristy annex were ordered complete by the Brotherhood in the 18th century. The space serves as a confessional chapel and is constituted by halls for catechesis.

It is unclear when the altar dedicated to Santo António (Saint Anthony) was first established, but Brotherhood of Santo António has existed since the 15th century, and continues to offer blessed bread on the 13th of each month. Similarly unclear is the altar to São Brás (Saint Blaise), which was dedicated to Blaise of Sebastea, 16th-century bishop and martyr, and completed in a Flemish design.

==== Presbytery ====
The presbytery is the centrepiece of the Church of the Azores, marked by the Bishop's cathedra and choir, established with the founding of the Dioceses in 1534, that includes seating for five dignitaries and 12 canons. The triumphal arch is surmounted by a Royal Coat of Arms over the Cross of Christ, symbolizing the concordat between the papacy, the Kingdom of Portugal, and the Order of Christ to expand Catholicism during the Age of Discovery. The retable, made of juniper wood dates to the 17th century, and includes painted figures from the Gospel, while in the middle is a figurative image of the Holy Saviour. Within the choir is the main altar and lateral altars, with the lateral figures of Saint Louis and Saint Elizabeth flanking the main cross. Two doorways provide access to the sacristy, with the larger door accessible to the public.

Access to the sacristy is made through the presbytery's ambulatory, and through the Sacristy of the Rosary (Portuguese: Sacristia do Rosário), likewise referred to as the Sacristy of the Chaplins (Portuguese: Sacristia dos Capelães), housing a gallery of paints of the bishops of Angra, dating to 1872. In the sacristy, of appreciable dimensions, is a great Baroque rosewood cupboard where the vestments are kept, and also pieces of furniture and art dating the history of the institution. At the end of the sacristy is a stone altar, with vestiges of gilding, with Baroque crucifix and manger. On the floor is the tombstone of Deão Francisco Burquó Del Rio (who died in 1745) founder of the altar. On the walls are paintings of the Bishops of Angra between 1534 and 1870.

==== Artifacts ====
A great portion of the artifacts date from the founding of the cathedral, and are in exhibition in the Museu de Arte Sacra annex, that also includes the Tesouro da Sé (Sé Treasury). This annex remains in a poor condition following its abandon, in 1829, when the majority of its silver artifacts were expropriated by the Casa da Moeda de Angra, and the 20th century damages caused by the 1980 earthquake.

The monument conserves a vast repository of historic and artistic artifacts, of which the following are examples:

- The facade and silver lamps of the Chapel of the Most Holy;
- Several hand-worked pieces of wooden furniture;
- Panels depicting the life of Christ (paintings on cedra wood, dating to the 16th century), originally installed in the chancel of the primitive church of São Salvador;
- A rosewood lectern, in the Indo-Portuguese style, with details in ivory, executed by artisans in Angra, from the Escola dos Mestres da Sé (Master School of Sé);
- A collection of sculptures also produced by the Masters School, dating to the 17th century;
- Azulejo tiles dating to the 18th century;
- A pontifical register pertaining to John V of Portugal;
- A Chinese vase from the Ming Dynasty;
- A manger from the school Machado de Castro;
- A gallery of paintings representing the Bishops of Angra;
