= Customshouse of Angra do Heroísmo =

- Alfândega de Angra do Heroísmo
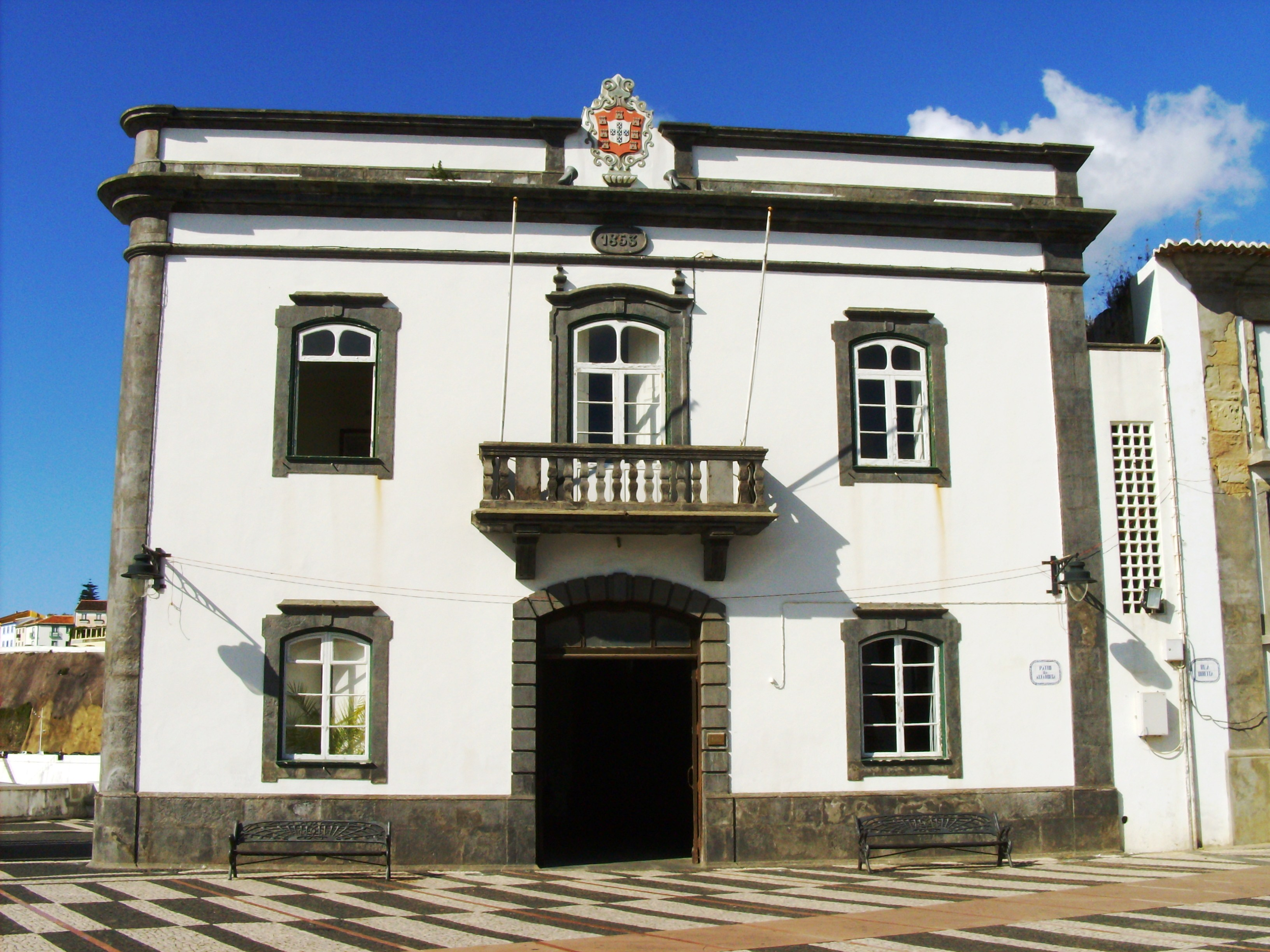
- The front facade of the simple customs house situated on the Patio da Alfândega
- Interactive map of the Customshouse of Angra do Heroísmo area

General information
- Type: Custom house
- Architectural style: Medieval
- Location: Sé, Portugal
- Coordinates: 38°39′13.89″N 27°13′7.60″W
- Opened: 1470
- Owner: Portuguese Republic

Technical details
- Material: Plastered stone

The Customhouse of Angra do Heroísmo (Portuguese: Alfândega de Angra do Heroísmo) is a well-preserved Portuguese custom house located in the civil parish of Sé, in the municipality of Angra do Heroísmo, in archipelago of the Azores.

== History ==
The customhouse wharf was constructed between 1470 and 1500, following the arrival of settlers to the island; it was initiated by Álvaro Martins Homem to assist the offload of colonists and goods from Atlantic shipping. But, it was only in the 16th century that the primitive customs building was constructed, which was directly linked to the wharf through the city gates.

On 18 January 1831, that decree 34 ordered the reorganization of military structures, resulting in the system of customhouse guards to prevent the trafficking in contraband on the island of Terceira; this was the precursor to the 1st Regiment of Customhouse Guards of Angra. A decree to restructure the guard corp and constitute a corp of Fiscal Guards occurred on 30 November 1846. By 1853, the current building was reconstructed or built.

On 7 December 1864, decree 1 classified the custom house as a first order maritime entrepot, with two first-order delegations on the islands of São Jorge and Graciosa, and two second-order delegations for Praia da Vitória and another in the villa of Topo.

Eventually, on 17 September 1885, the kingdom's guard corp was reconstituted into the Fiscal Guard and the Angra Fiscal District was constituted. The following year, the Independent Company 3 was created.

By the 19th century, the custom houses received steamships transiting the Atlantic, but, due to the depth of the bay, they were required to anchor farther from the docks.

Between 1950 and 1951, the DGEMN, the Delegação das Obras das Cadeias (Prison Works Delegation), the Delegação das Guardas Republicana e Fiscal (Republican Fiscal Guard Delegation) and the Delegação das Alfândegas (Customshouse Delegation) performed work on the site, including repairs to the building, that continued into 1955. Between the 20th and 21st century, conservation efforts and restoration along the customshouse wharf unearthed infrastructures associated with the primitive city of Angra, that included: vestiges of a bastion fortification; a complex water and sewer networks; and three levels of staircases and patios, that were buried by the accumulation of material.

== Architecture ==
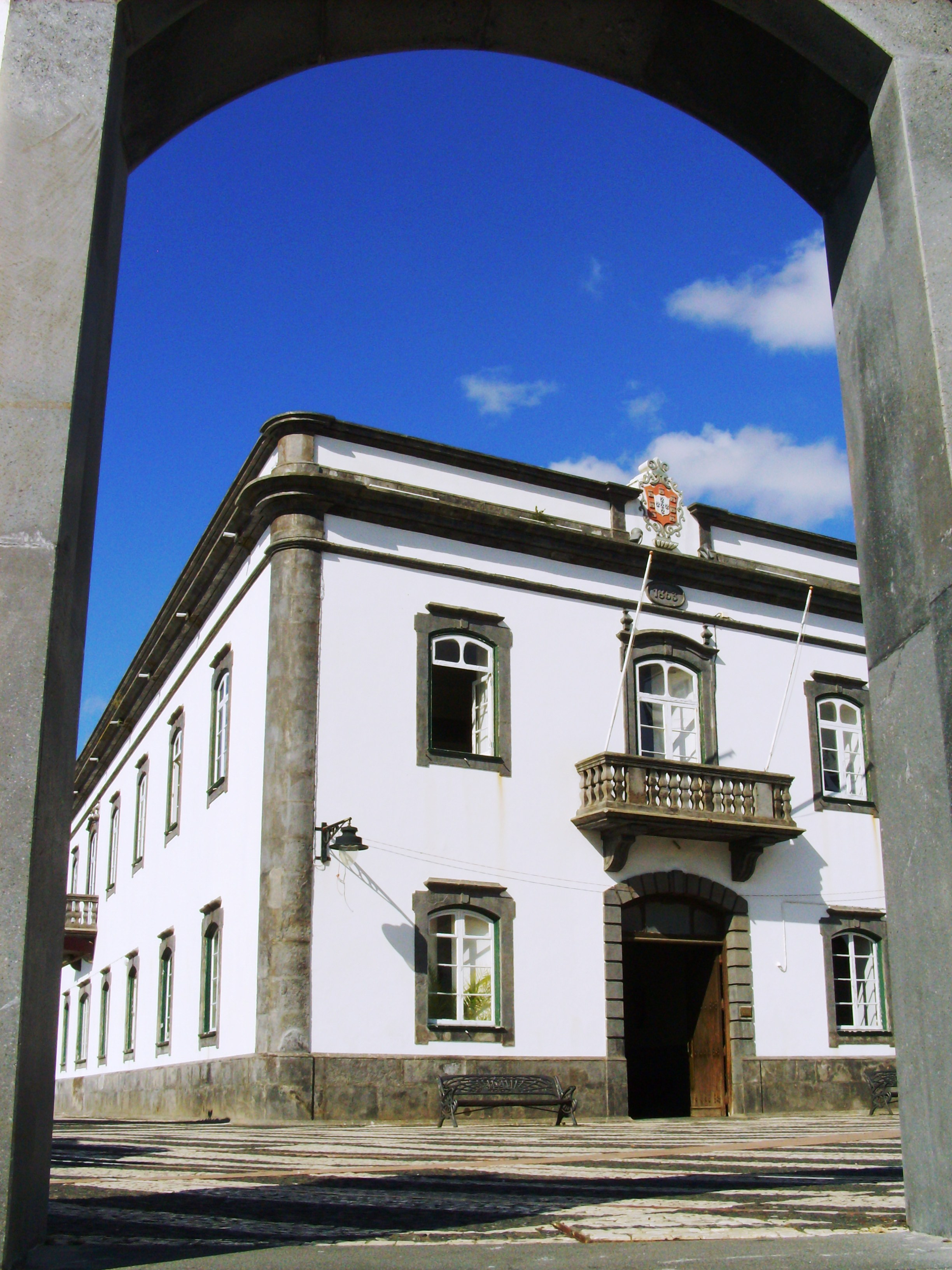
A view of the custom house, as seen the primitive customhouse gates to the city of Angra

The building is situated in the urban context of the city of Angra, addorsed in the north by other buildings. It was erected on the southern limit of the urbanized block of the historical centre, in the oldest part of the city, limited by roads, the Patio da Alfândega and the city gates. The Pátio da Alfândega is a square of Portuguese pavement stone (in alternating patterns) with bunks, oriented towards the port and bay of Angra. Immediately nearby (to the east) is the Church of the Misericórdia of Angra and building of the detachment of the GNR Guarada Nacional Republicana Fiscal Brigade.

The building includes a rectangular plan, with simple volumes and homogeneous covering in tile. The two-story facade is plastered and painted in white, covered by masonry foundation with pilaster-ed corners (with those to the bay convex) and finished in entablature surmounted by full parapet, capped in stone. Above the building facades are two cornices capped by granite. The eastern facade includes rounded portal flanked by rectangular windows, while the second floor is complemented by a door-window and veranda flanked by similar windows. This facade, which is the principal entrance to the building includes masts for flags, while the cornices are broken above by an oval-like, painted coat-of-arms. Between the second-floor veranda and coat-of-arms is a basalt sculpted-stone with "1853" date. The longer, southern facade includes a series of windows on the first and second floors, but with a small veranda window-door on the central part of the second floor. This central feature is complemented by a larger window on the first floor, directly below the veranda.
