= Siva (rural locality) =

Siva (Russian: Сива) is the name of several rural localities in Russia:

- Siva, Kirov Oblast, a village in Malmyzhsky District of Kirov Oblast
- Siva, Perm Krai, a selo in Sivinsky District of Perm Krai
