= Pero Anes do Canto =

Portuguese nobleman (1480-1556)

Pero Anes do Canto (1480–1556) was a Portuguese nobleman, who was born at Guimarães, Portugal and died at Angra do Heroísmo, on the island of Terceira in the Azores. He was the superintendent of fortifications on Terceira, who, for his competency in that role and other services to the Portuguese crown, was rewarded with the title moço fidalgo (knight-gentleman) of the royal house, and the high office of "Purveyor to the Armada of the Islands and the merchant vessels of the East India trade in all of the islands of the Azores", a title that devolved upon successive members of the Canto family for about three hundred years, and of which he was the first bearer.

== Personal life ==
The family of Pero Anes do Canto descended from Sir John Chandos, a noble Englishman who accompanied Edward, the Black Prince to Castile in support of Pedro I of Portugal. The Englishman later moved to Portugal and established himself at Guimarães during the reign of John I of Portugal.

Anes do Canto was married twice, first to Joana Abarca, daughter to João Vaz Corte-Real; she died in 1511. Then, in 1517, he married again to Violante da Silva, daughter to Duarte Galvão. He had at least two children from these marriages, and two more out of wedlock.
