= Sé (Angra do Heroísmo) =

- Civil parish
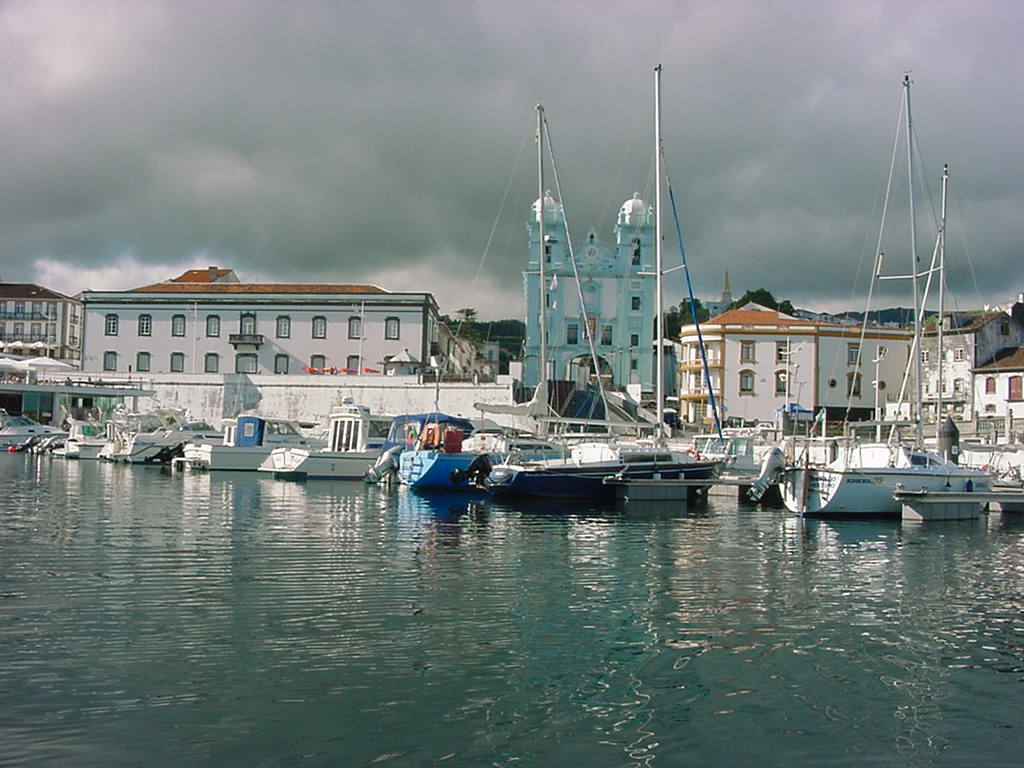
- The iconic imagery of the city of Angra, are all part of the parish of Sé, including the marina, cathedral and gates of the city

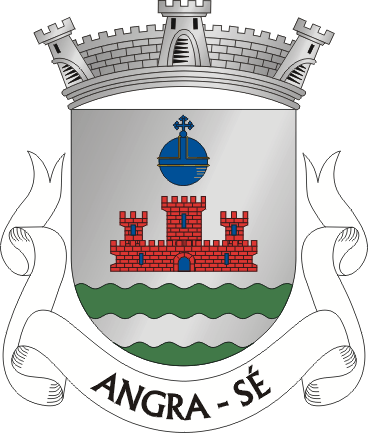
- Coat of arms

- Location in the Azores Sé (Terceira)
- Coordinates: 38°39′18″N 27°13′15″W
- Country: Portugal
- Auton. region: Azores
- Island: Terceira
- Municipality: Angra do Heroísmo
- Established: Settlement: fl. 1500; Parish: c. 1534; Civil parish: 25 November 1830

Area
  - Total: 1.65 km^{2} (0.64 sq mi)
- Elevation: 27 m (89 ft)

Population (2011)
  - Total: 955
  - Density: 579/km^{2} (1,500/sq mi)
- Time zone: UTC−01:00 (AZOT)
  - Summer (DST): UTC+00:00 (AZOST)
- Postal code: 9700-171
- Area code: (+351) 292 XXX-XXXX
- Patron: São Salvador
- Website: http://www.juntafreguesiase.org

Sé is a parish in the municipality of Angra do Heroísmo on the island of Terceira in the Azores. The population in 2011 was 955, in an area of 1.65 km^{2} (0.64 sq mi). It is one of the smallest parishes in Angra do Heroísmo.

== History ==
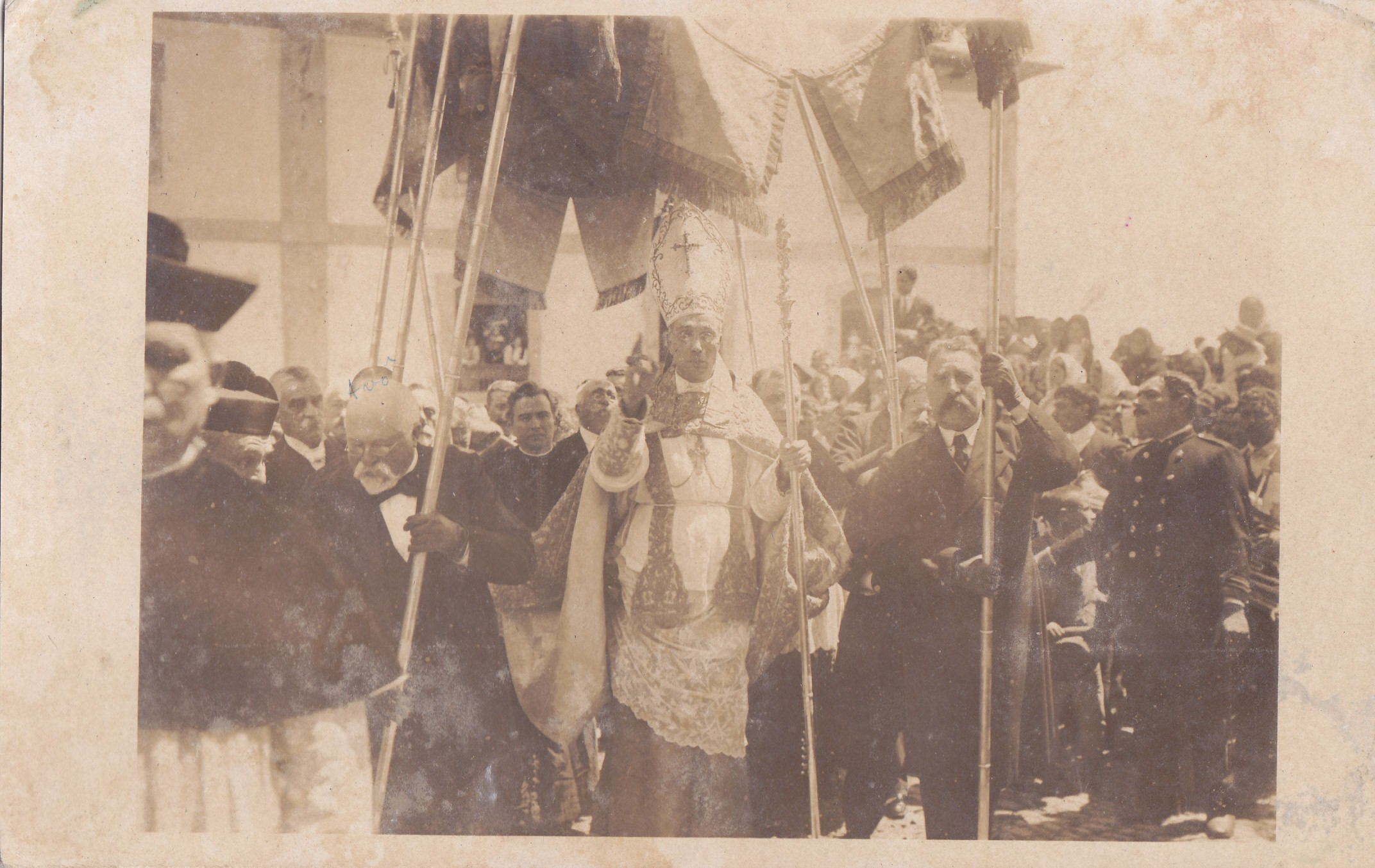
The bishop of Angra, D. Manuel Damasceno da Costa, taken in 1918 at the Sé Cathedral

Designated the island of Jesus Christ (Ilha de Jesus Cristo), at the time of its discovery and exploration by Portuguese navigators: the settlement of Terceira began around 1450, when it was conceded to the Fleming Jácome de Bruges, by Infante D. Henrique. The first settlers to the island disembarked in the areas of Porto Judeu and Pria, and slowly extended throughout the island.

In the hilltop of Monte Brasil is the Fort of São João Baptista (also known as the Fort of São Filipe), built at the beginning of the era of Castilian occupation of the archipelago. It was constructed with the intention of being a potent fortress, to guard the riches and circulation of European shipping into the Americas. This castle, with its high walls and grande scale, was constructed from the middle of the 16th century and first half of the following century. During the period of the Portuguese Restoration War, which began with the revolution of 1 December 1640, and ended with the peace of 1668, forces loyal to the Spanish resisted the Portuguese. It was only two years later, in 1642, that the Spanish rendered and the city of Angra were, in fact, freed.

The name Sé came from the topological name for the religious administrative territory governed by the diocesan cathedral in Angra: Sé is the location of the only cathedral in the archipelago of the Azores.

== Geography ==
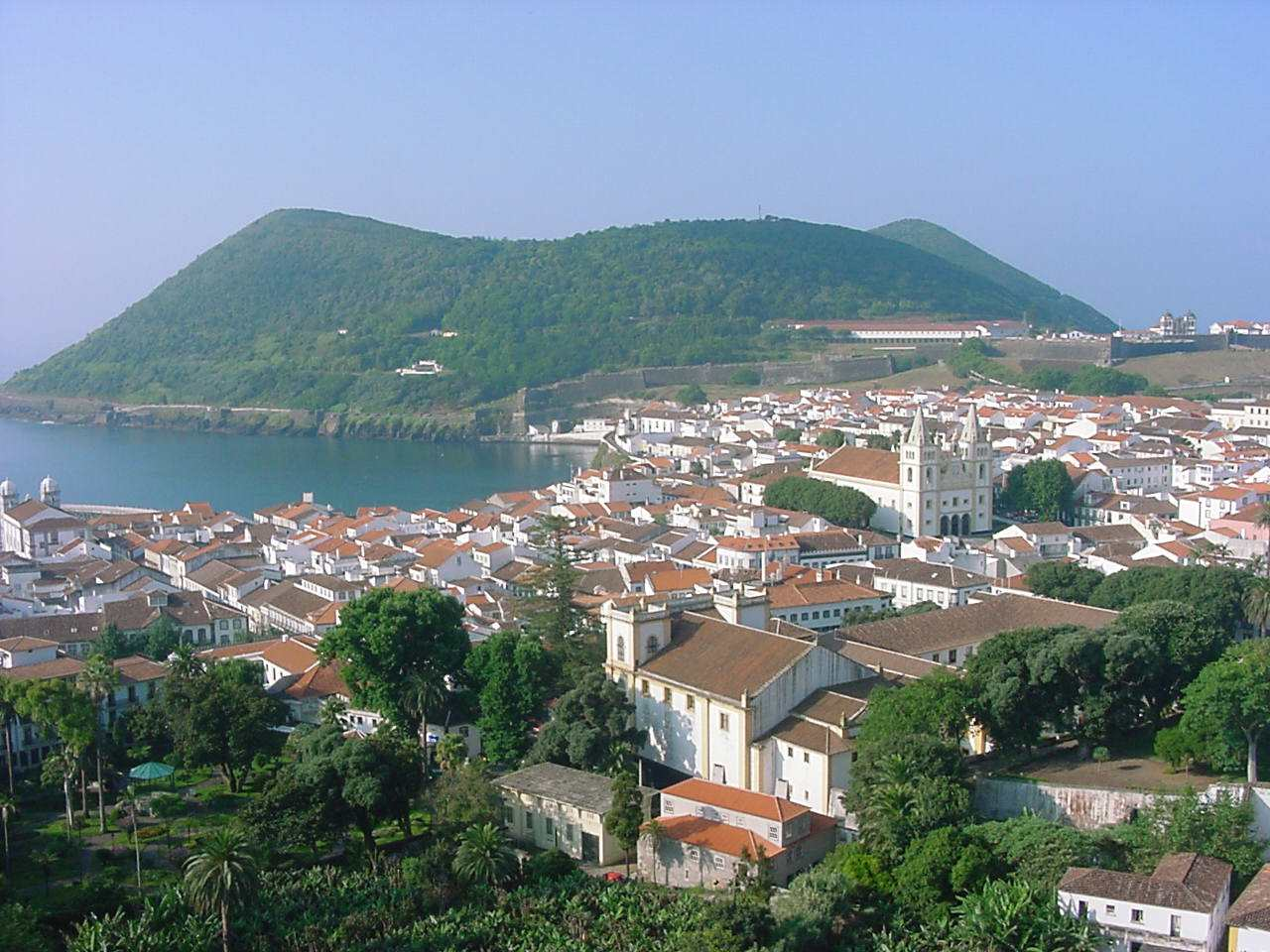
The landscape of the central parish of Angra do Heroísmo

Situated on the island of Terceira, the civil parish of Sé, along with the surrounding parishes constitute the city of Angra do Heroísmo, seat of the municipality.

== Economy ==
Many of the economic activities in the parish are related to commerce and service sectors, since the island is a primary destination for tourism.

== Architecture ==
=== Civic ===
- Episcopal Palace of Angra do Heroísmo (Portuguese: Paço episcopal de Angra do Heroísmo), former 16th century manorhouse, used as the residence of the Bishop of Angra over the centuries, eventually converted and reused in the public sector.

=== Religious ===
- Sé Cathedral (Portuguese: Sé Catedral de Angra do Heroísmo), built after 1570, over the ruins of the 15th century Church of the Divino Salvador, which were severely damaged. Destroyed by violent earthquakes, in the 18th century the Sé of Angra was reconstructed in accord with the Mannerist principals of the 16th century. Its main facade included two two-story bell-towers, linked by a pediment with central clock and iron cross.
