= Fort of the Church of São Mateus da Calheta =

Former fort in Portugal

- Forte da Igreja de São Mateus da Calheta
- Terceira, Central, Azores

Site information
- Type: Fort
- Owner: Portuguese Republic
- Operator: Junta de Freguesia de São Mateus da Calheta
- Open to the public: Public

Location
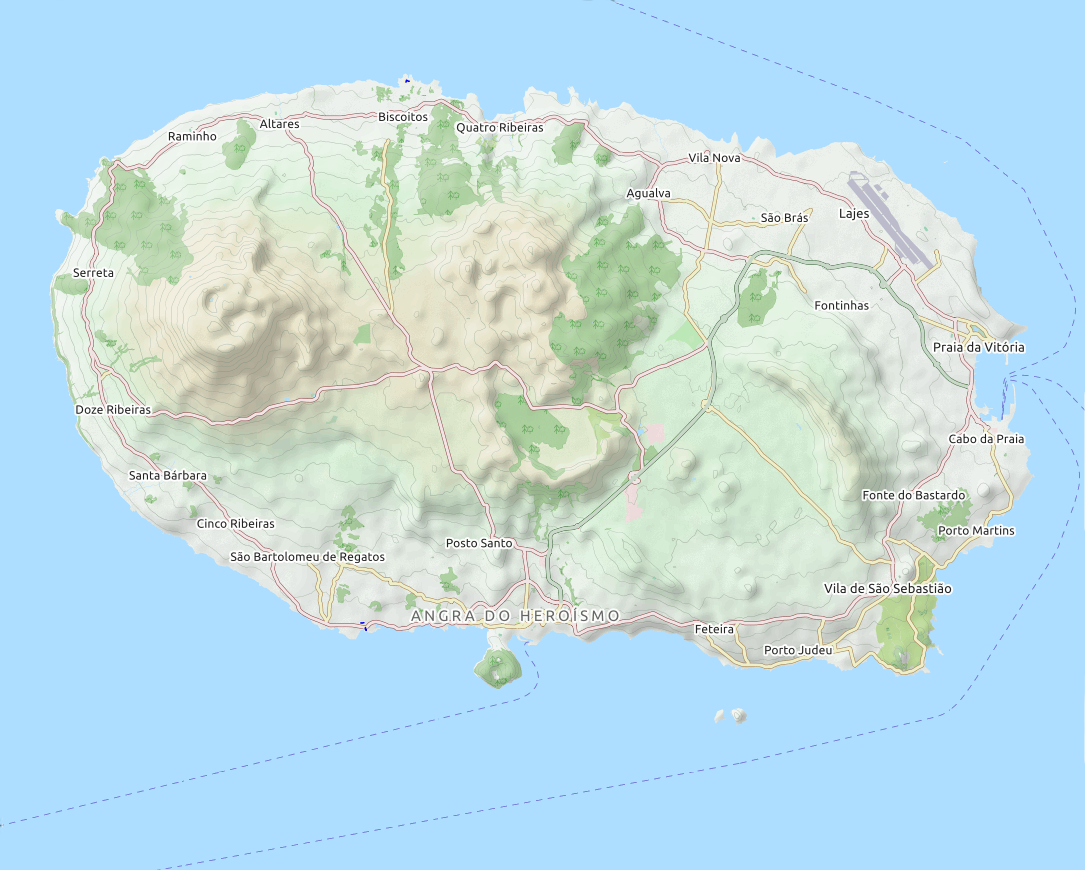
- Location of the fort within the municipality of Angra do Heroísmo
- Coordinates: 38°39′18″N 27°16′20″W

Site history
- Built: 1567
- Materials: Basalt

The Fort of the Church São Mateus da Calheta (Portuguese: Forte da Igreja de São Mateus da Calheta), also referred to as the Forte da Igreja (Church Fort or Fort of the Church), are the coastal ruins of a 16th-century fort situated in the civil parish of São Mateus da Calheta, municipality of Angra do Heroísmo, on the Portuguese island of Terceira, in the archipelago of the Azores. It was destroyed, along with the church, in 1893 during a cyclone; while the church was eventually reconstructed some years later (the parochial Church of São Mateus da Calheta), the fort was abandoned and left to ruin.

== History ==
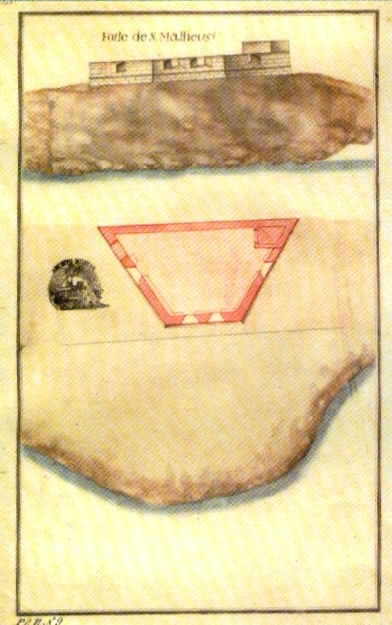
Forte de São Mateus (José Rodrigo de Almeida, 1830, GEAEM)

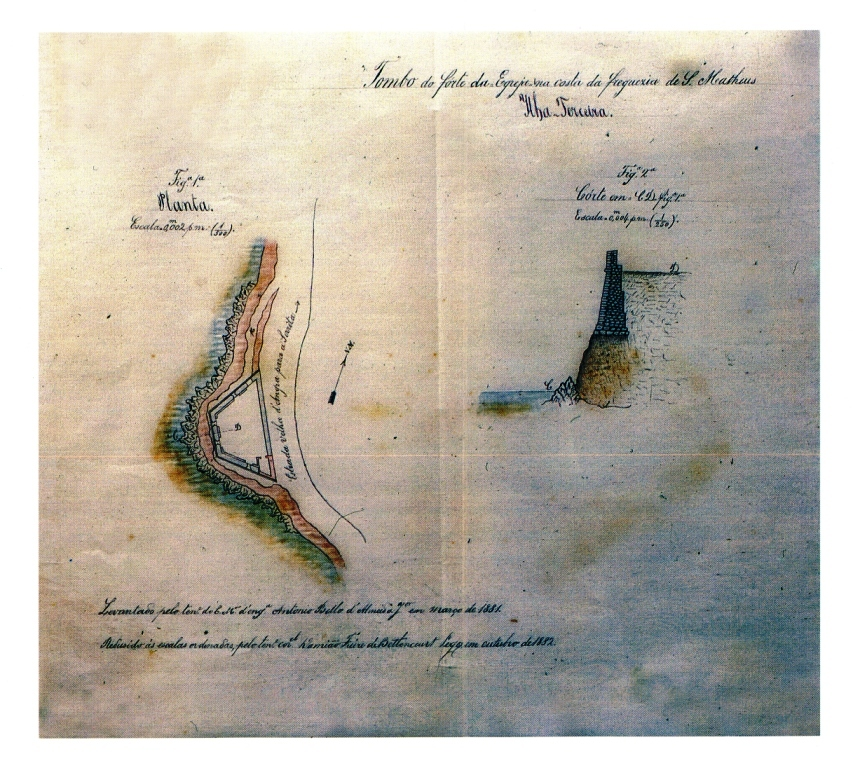
Planta do Forte da Igreja (António Belo de Almeida Jr.; Damião Pego, 1881–1882.)

The Fort of São Mateus was one of the first bastions constructed during the context of the Portuguese succession crisis of 1580, authorized by then-magistrate Ciprião de Figueiredo e Vasconcelos, under the plans for the island elaborated by Tommaso Benedetto de Pesaro in 1567. This followed an attack by French corsair Pierre Bertrand de Montluc on Funchal (in October 1566), and a tentative attempt during the same year on Angra (which had been repelled):

"There didn't exist at that time [during the Succession Crisis of 1580] all along the island coast some fortress, except that of São Sebastião, that if along the southern curtain there had been a few redoubts and stations, in the areas susceptible to enemy disembarkation, due to the indications and plan of engineer Timás Benedito, that in his diligence he undertook in the year 1567, after which, the French, led by the terrible pirate Caldeira, barbarously sacked the island of Madeira, and intended to do the same on this island, where it appears they were repelled at force of arms."

Drummond later recorded:

"The strongest [forts] that Ciprião de Figueiredo ordered constructed in the places that were designated, were the following: in the bay of the city, between the mentioned Fort of Santo António do Monte Brasil and the new port, erected another fort; towards the west, where we call Prainha, another, and all with artillery, closed and between a few ran walls with their cordons, and soldiers within, and with good gates to the land. The constructed farther ahead the Fortress of São Mateus, the fort of Calheta, and the Negrito; and from there until Serreta the created trenches in a few places, owing to the rough waters along the coast."

It was there, during the history of the parish of São Mateus, that the carracks found landfall on their return from the Indies, in search of the port of Angra.

During the War of the Spanish Succession (1702–1714) the fort was referred to as the Redoubt of São Mateus (Portuguese: O Reduto de S. Matheus), in report dated 1710.

With the establishment of the Captaincy-General of the Azores, an evaluation of the fort, in 1767, found:

"34º - Redoubt of São Mateus. Needs a new door; it has three emplacements with three, good, iron pieces and its repairs good, and in order to guard it requires three artillerymen and a dozen auxiliaries."

A codex to this analysis was provided by adjunte Manoel Correa Branco (in 1776) who indicated that no public works were necessary.

During the Liberal War, the fort continued to be an important strategic fortification, its plan formalized in the collection of plans developed by José Rodrigo de Almeida, in the Gabinete de Estudos de Arquitetura e Engenharia Militar (Cabinet for Architectural Studies and Military Engineering), in Lisbon.

Yet, a report by Field Marshal Barão de Bastos in 1862 indicated that the fort was incapable of any activities for several years.

In 1881, the fort was inspected by lieutenant engineer António Belo de Almeida Júnior, who found the structure in good condition, although he noted that the barriers were inconsistent and only protected by the walls that surrounded it.

On 28 August 1893 a cyclone or exceptional summer storm resulted in the destruction of many of the buildings on the island, including the fort and its neighbouring church. Its abandon was almost complete, and over time its strategic importance and lack of reconstruction meant that that fort fell into ruin: it did not survive into the modern epoch.

== Architecture ==
Located on a dominant position over a stretch of the coast west of Angra do Heroísmo, it was situated in a cove that allowed easy offloading of provisions to the island. The fortification was used to defend the anchorage from attacks by pirates and corsairs, that frequented the waters of the mid-Atlantic. It was constructed between the Fort of Negrito and Fort of the Terreiro, providing an important crossfire position some 22 metres (72 ft) in front of the old Church of São Mateus of Calheta, from which it derived its name.

A baluarte, the fort was of small dimensions with a trapezoidal plan, occupying an area of approximately 204 metres (669 ft).

Within its brickwork walls, were four cannon emplacements, two central, while the remaining cannon emplacements guarded the lateral flanks, yet not parallel. Between the emplacements are bunks for fuzilheres. On the eastern end of the structure was a small building that acted as a powder magazine and storehouse.

Access to the fort occurred across a public road, by a 1.4 metres (4.6 ft) ramp until the main gate and walls
