= Fort of São João (São Mateus da Calheta) =

Fort in the Azores

- Forte de São João
- Terceira, Central, name=Azores in Portugal
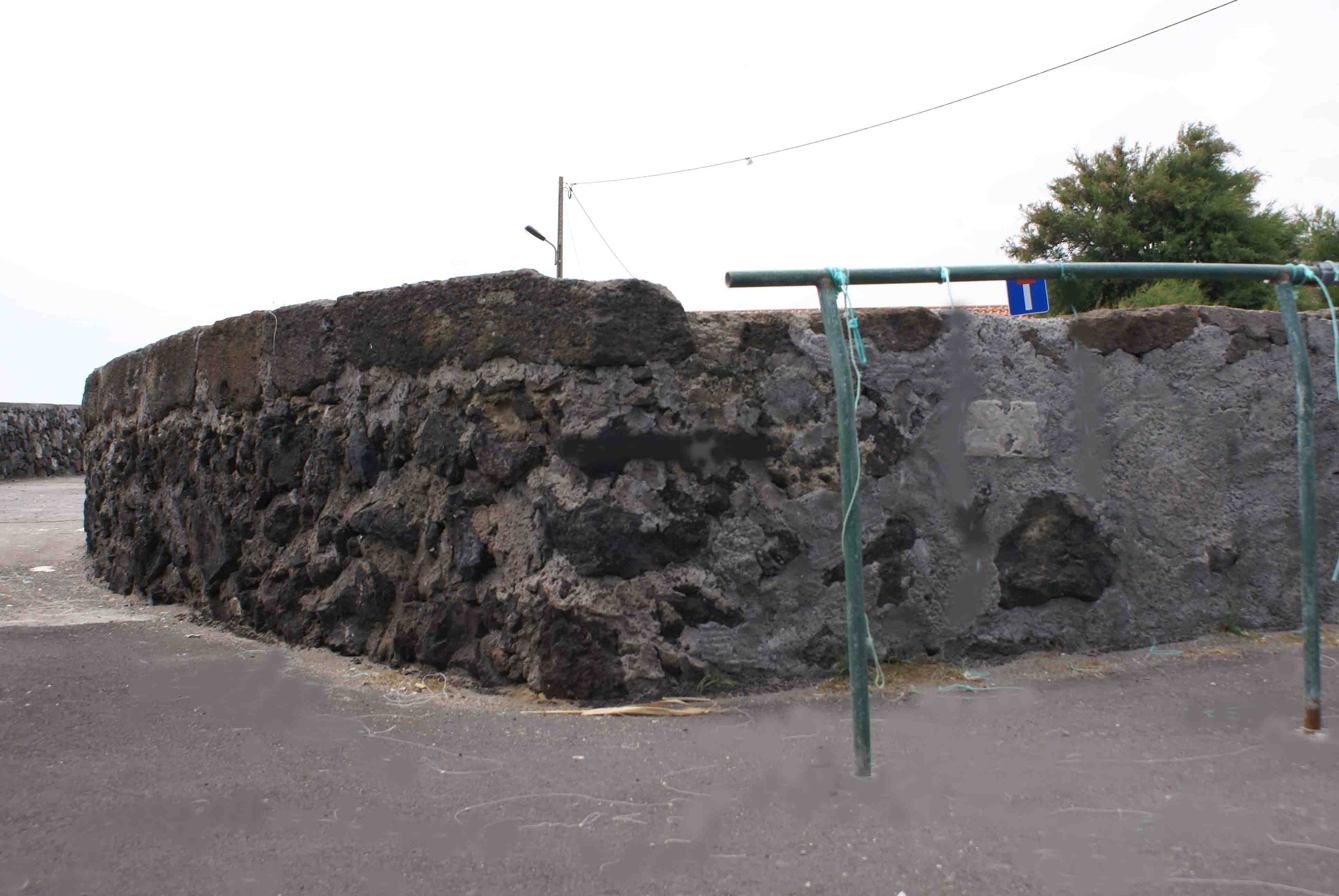
- The remains of the ancient Fort of São João/Biscoitinhos that was part of the coastal defenses during the 16th century

Site information
- Type: Fort
- Owner: Portuguese Republic
- Operator: Junta de Freguesia de São Mateus da Calheta
- Open to the public: Public

Location
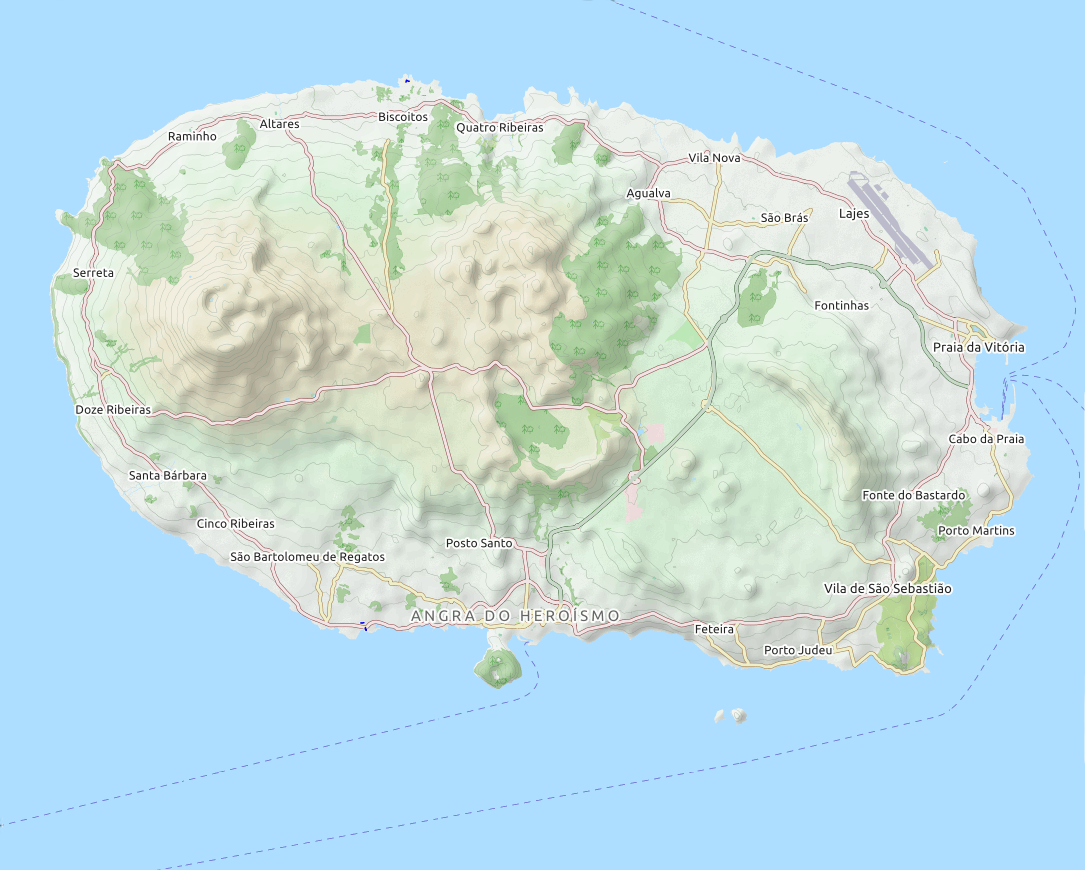
- Location of the fort within the municipality of Angra do Heroísmo
- Coordinates: 38°39′15.75″N 27°16′10.12″W

Site history
- Materials: Basalt

Fort of São João (Portuguese: Forte de São João), also known as Fort of Biscoitinho (for the lava rock formations along its coastal frontier), is a medieval fort, in the civil parish of São Mateus da Calheta, in the municipality of Angra do Heroísmo, on the Portuguese archipelago of the Azores.

== History ==
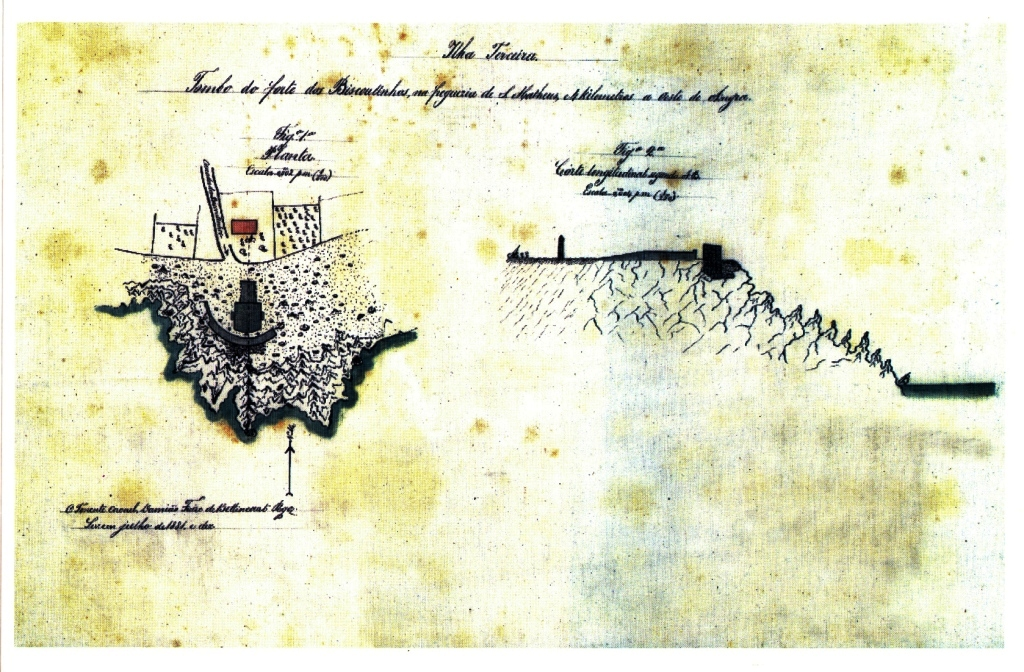
Plan of the fort: 1881 drawing from the Tombos dos Fortes da Ilha Terceira

The redoubt was not identified in the early coastal defense plan resulting from the Portuguese succession crisis of 1580, nor in the 1581 defensive map elaborated by Tommaso Benedetto, which was executed by Ciprião de Figueiredo e Vasconcelos, corregador of the Azores.

Similarly, the project was never elaborated by successive military commanders, including Sergeant-Major João António Júdice (1767), Infantry Captain Francisco Xavier Machado (1771-1772), or activities of Manoel Correa Branco (1776). Plans by José Rodrigo de Almeida, also lack any mention of this platform, during the period leading to the Liberal Wars (1818 to 1820), when Captain-General Francisco António de Araújo e Azevedo reinforced coastal defenses, repair and reconstructing several of the forts in the Azores.

The first reference to this fort, then referred to as Biscoitinhos appeared in the 19th century, and may have mistakenly referred to the Redoubt of Poço, then mentioned by Júdice (1767). More than likely it was confused with the Fort of Açougue (Portuguese: Forte do Açougue) ", and identified by Gaspar Frutuoso at the end of the 16th century.

In the context of the Liberal Wars (1828-1834) the Fort of São João was repaired, leading to the 1862 reference by the Baron of Bastos, who reported that the fort was "a simple barbette with an 18-calibre; it has no lodging or magazine".

By 1881, however, it had been abandoned and was in ruins.

By the 20th century, the retaining walls of the redoubt were reinforced and consolidated by the parish council of São Mateus.

== Architecture ==
It is situated between the historical Fortress of São Mateus da Calheta and Fort of the Church, with which it cooperated in the defence of the bay of São Mateus, on the southern coast of the island of Terceira.

Technically, it is classified as a land battery, since it is not enclosed fortification, but a semi-circular base. Although originally equipped with one piece of artillery, protected by a barbette, the masonry structure was without any ancillary buildings.
