= Fort of Negrito =

- Forte do Negrito
- Terceira, Central, name=Azores in Portugal
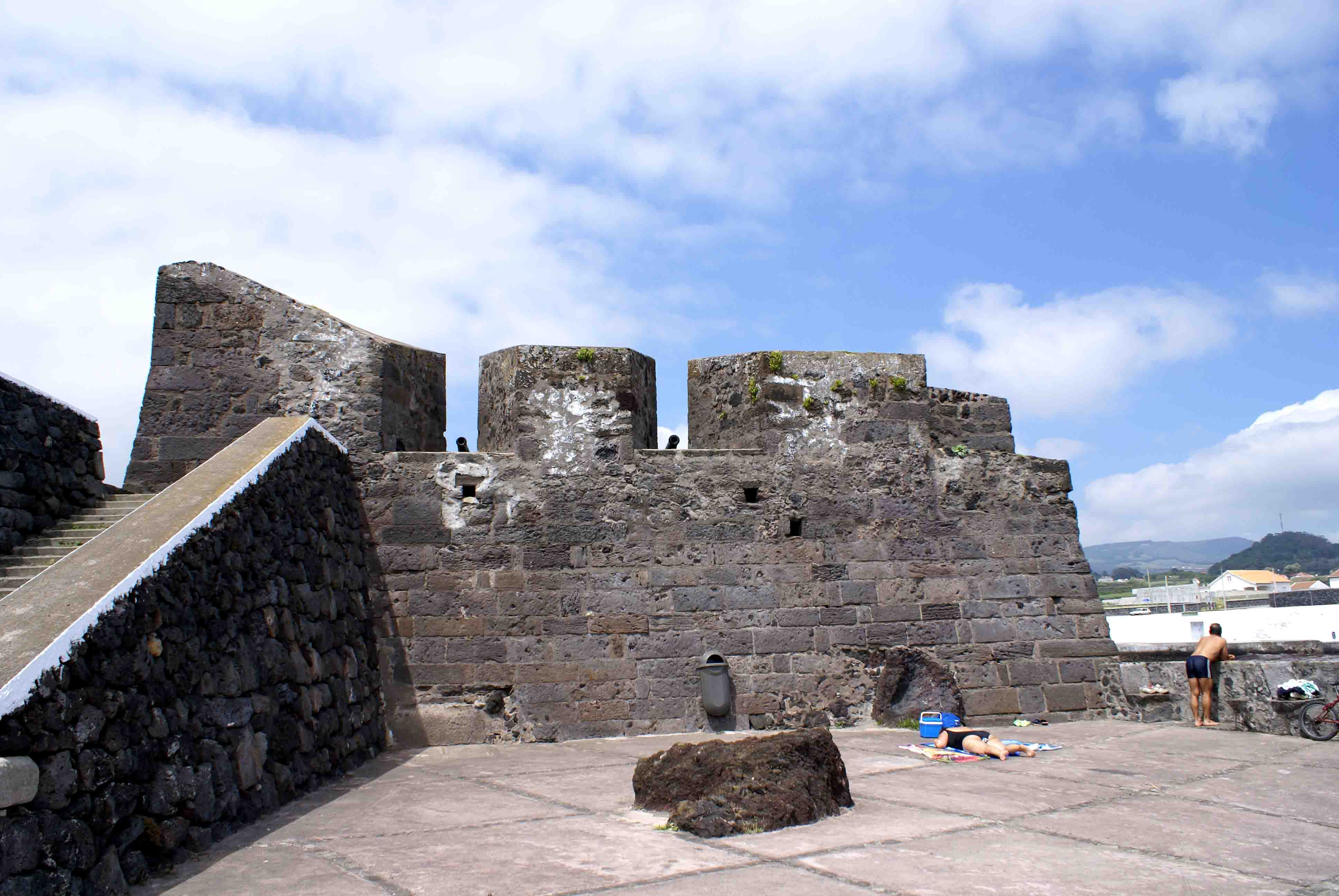
- The pool-side facade (southeast) of the Fort of Negrito, showing the crenellations for implacements

Site information
- Type: Fort
- Owner: Portuguese Republic
- Operator: Junta de Freguesia de São Mateus da Calheta
- Open to the public: Public

Location
- Coordinates: 38°39′19.93″N 27°16′55.57″W

Site history
- Built: 16th century
- Materials: Basalt, Wood, Tile

The Fort of Negrito (Portuguese: Forte de Negrito) is a 16th-century maritime fort situated in the civil parish of São Mateus da Calheta, in the municipality of Angra do Heroísmo on the island of Terceira, Azores, Portugal.

== History ==
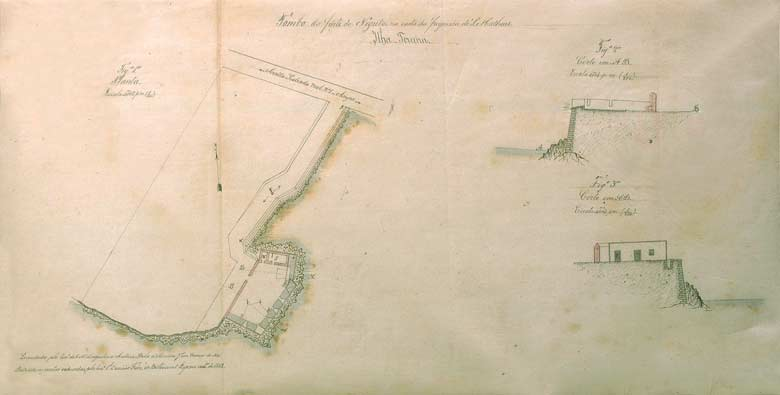
A detailed layout of the fort from 1881

The fort was constructed in 1581, to support the defense of the island from an eminent Spanish invasion, brought on by the succession crisis of 1580. It was constructed simultaneously with the neighboring Fort of Salga, under the authority of the Azorean Inspector-General/Magistrate, Ciprião de Figueiredo e Vasconcelos, in conformity with the defense plan for the island elaborated by Engineer Tommaso Benedetto de Pesaro. Its construction was paid for with tax increases over commercial goods, foodstuffs, anchorage duties and, much later, by new taxes imposed on the estates in the archipelago, with citizens in Angra contributing 10.000 Cruzados, while villagers of Praia submitted 5.000 cruzados.

The fort was part of an integrated system of fortifications, that followed in the southern coast of the island, consisting of small redoubts. This fort crossed-firing lines with the Forte da Igreja.

Between the 17th and end of the 19th centuries, the site was always under bombardment from pirates, invaders or rebels, owing to its important strategic position, being garrisoned by five artillery pieces, and 20 support canon.

In 1830, a plan for the site was elaborated by José Rodrigo de Almeida, with the main bulwark oriented towards the northwest. Later, the northwestern battlements, which were oriented towards the land, were removed, along with a square in the southwestern corner.

From the Baron of Bastos, "the walls towards the sea require some repairs; although the budget has been approved, the plan has not been executed, due to a lack of funds." In 1881 the elaborated battlements had been extended to505 square metres (5,440 ft^{2}).

At the end of the 19th century, the building served as a warehouse and residents for fishermen employed in whale-hunting. Its design was altered in the 19th century, with the suppression of the battery along the southwest corner, which almost acted as intermediary bulwark, along with the northwest corner and northern wall (which is extensively irregular and without parapet). Along the road that connected the fort to the regional roadway, a banquette was used by fusiliers (today there are no remnants of this firing line).

The space was once again used to garrison troops during the First and Second World Wars.

Sometime between 1959 and 1964, the fort was transferred from the military to the municipal council of Angra do Heroísmo, through the initiative of Manuel Coelho Baptista de Lima (then president), in order to serve as a cultural and tourist attraction. Until this time the fort was occupied by an old widow, in deplorable conditions, with minor sanitary conditions.

In 1940, restoration work was completed on the fort, under the direction of sergeants Laranjeira and Lima.

== Architecture ==
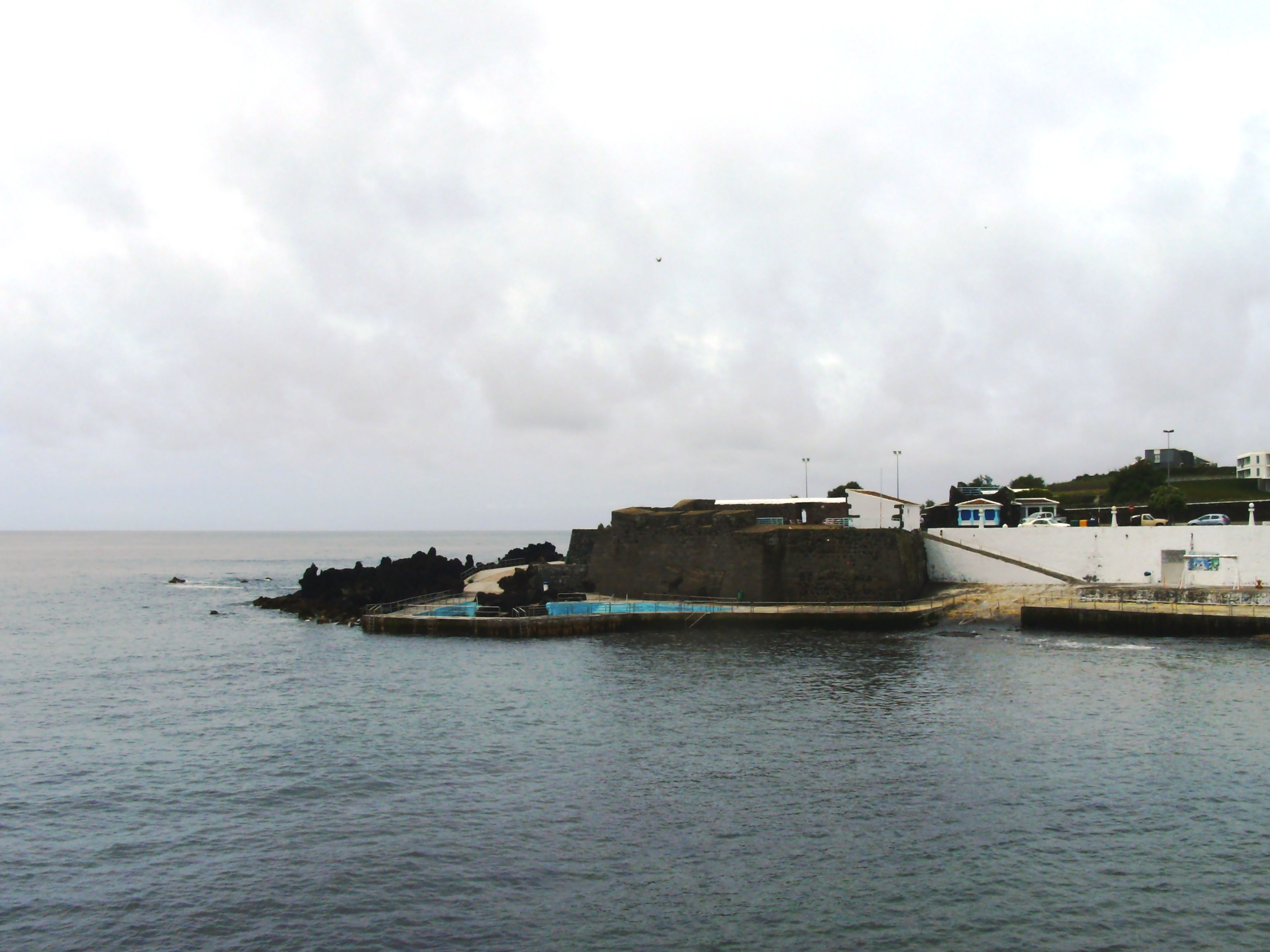
A perspective of the fort along the coast, showing the recreational pool and bathing area

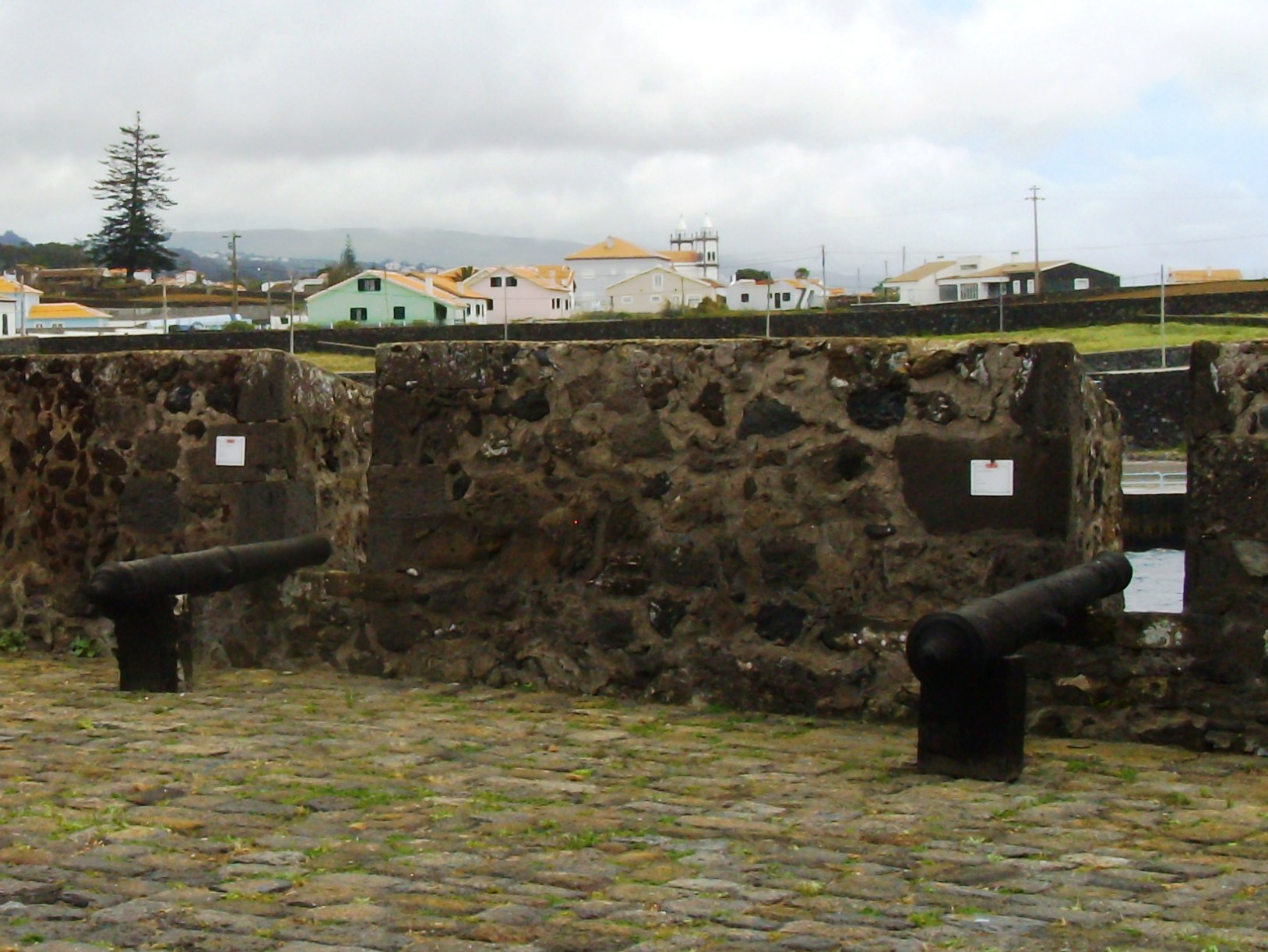
Artillery pieces along the battlements

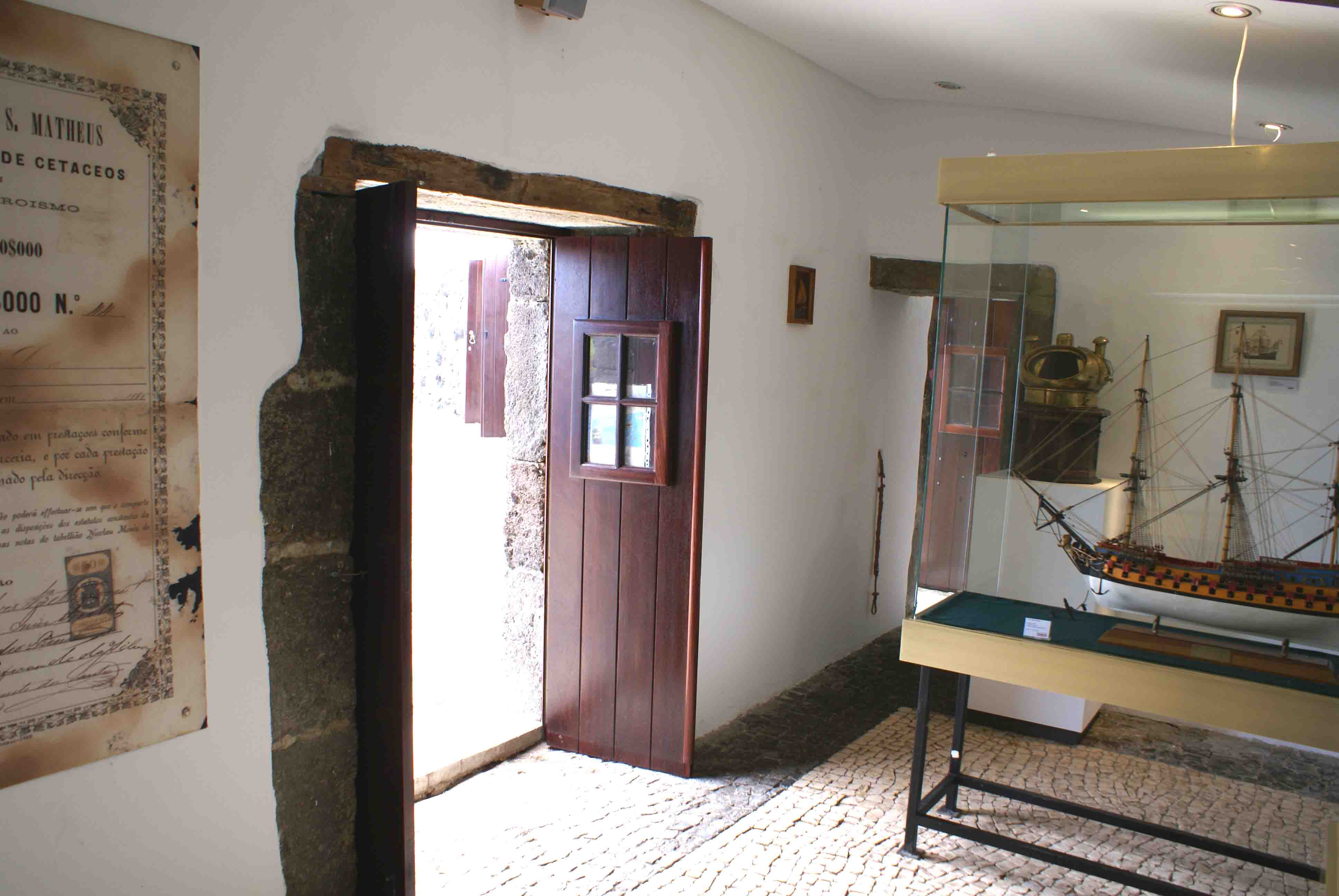
The museum of military history within the buildings of the fort

The fort is located along the coast, implanted west of Angra, in an area that historically permitted access to ships. Over a rocky coastal shore, the fort followed the slope until the sea level, today in the bathing area of Negrito. The sea pools are located in the east, with spaces to the east and south for sunbathing, accessible from stone steps, with garden, ovens, bar and parking along a western strip. Immediately nearby is the Forte da Igreja (Fort of the Church). Arranged along the battlements are various artillery pieces.

It is a rectangular fort with an inflected eastern zone, with a building in the interior occupying almost the entire north face.

The battlements extend along the coastal slope, with the exterior (to the west) escarpment facing the land, painted in white and corners in stonework. This area is crowned by a smooth parapet, while stonework covers the remaining facades, crowned in parapets with merlons and canons in the north and northeast corner, there with metallic tubular guard, painted in blue.

The facade that faces land is broken by a rectangular door, frame and almost at a right angle, three firing emplacements, also framed. In the fort's northwest angle protrudes the interior body, also visible above the northern curtain.

=== Interior ===
The interior has a rectangular plan, with simple volumes and homogeneous covering in tile, decorated in stark simple edge. The walls are decorated and painted in white, with corners in stonework and principal facade to the south, broken by two rectangular doors, all framed.

Within the interior, there are two small dependencies, the smallest for the guard, and the other acting as warehouse. The walls in these interiors are painted in white, with the corners and ceiling stuccoed. The large courtyard has covered in pavement.
