= São Mateus da Calheta =

- Civil parish
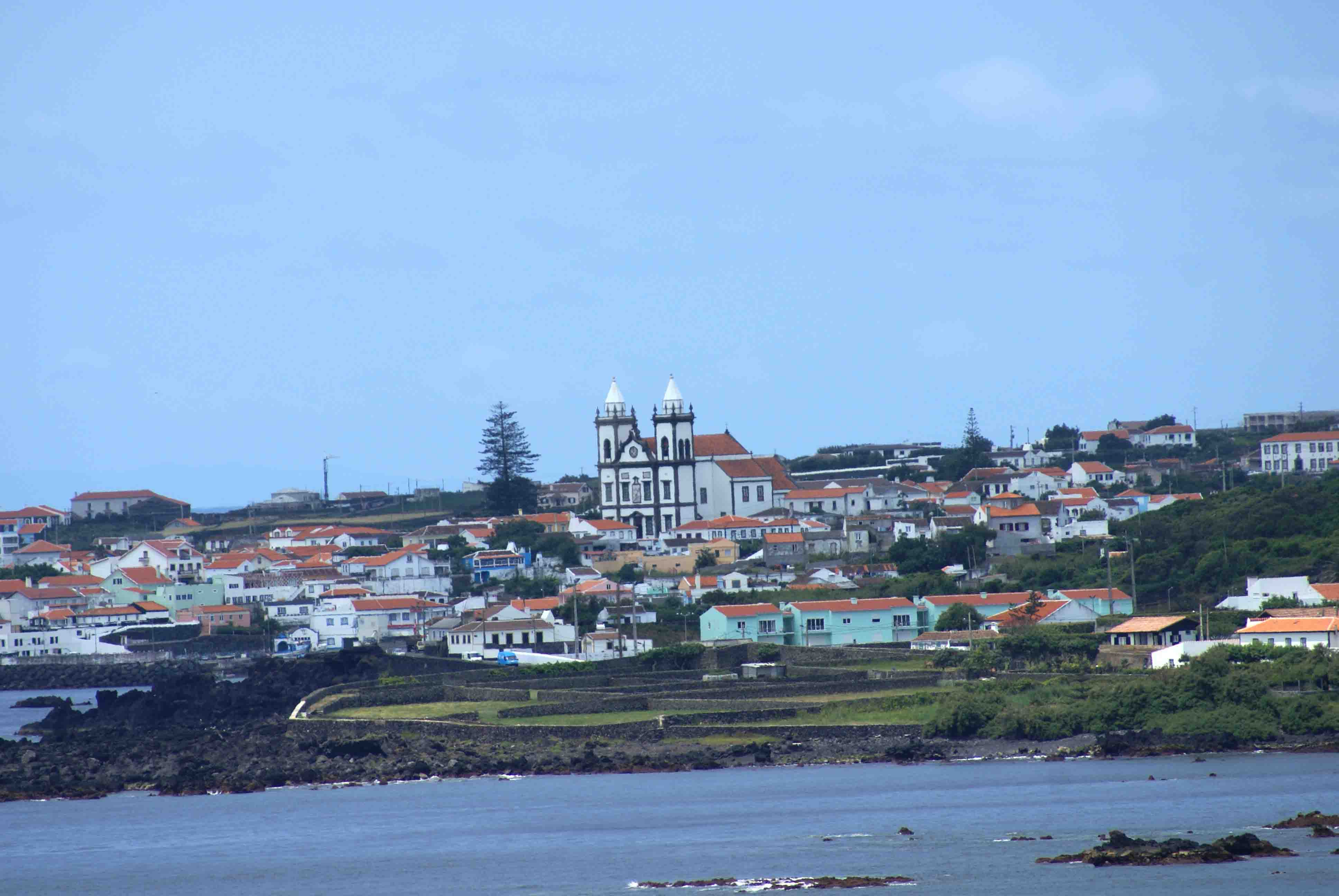
- A perspective of the village of São Mateus by the coast.

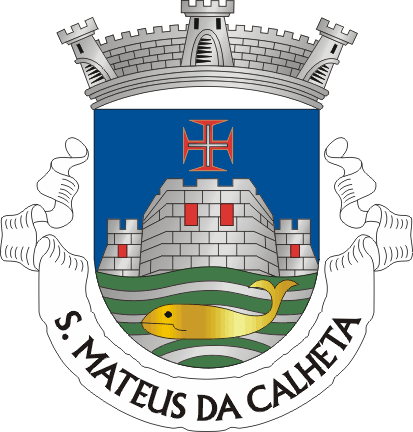
- Coat of arms

- Location in the Azores São Mateus da Calheta (Terceira)
- Coordinates: 38°39′27″N 27°16′12″W
- Country: Portugal
- Auton. region: Azores
- Island: Terceira
- Municipality: Angra do Heroísmo
- Established: Settlement: fl. 1500; Parish: c. 1560

Area
  - Total: 5.98 km^{2} (2.31 sq mi)
- Elevation: 23 m (75 ft)

Population (2011)
  - Total: 3,757
  - Density: 628/km^{2} (1,630/sq mi)
- Time zone: UTC−01:00 (AZOT)
  - Summer (DST): UTC+00:00 (AZOST)
- Postal code: 9700-563
- Area code: 292
- Patron: São Mateus
- Website: www.jfsaomateus.com

São Mateus da Calheta is a civil parish within the municipality of Angra do Heroísmo in the Portuguese archipelago of the Azores. The population in 2011 was 3,757, in an area of 5.98 km^{2}. It is located on the periphery of the urbanized area of the city of Angra do Heroísmo (approximately four 4 kilometres (2.5 mi) from the center), and developed from a small fishing port in a bay along the volcanic coast of the island (calheta is Portuguese for small bay).

== History ==
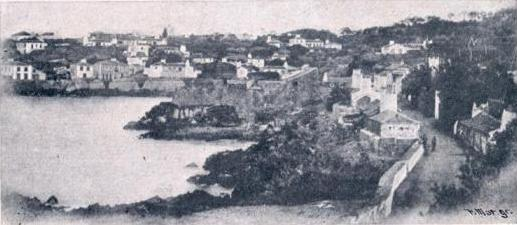
A view of São Mateus da Calheta in 1903

During the early period of settlement, the São Mateus coast was dotted by bays, some peppered with small beaches. One of these, which became known as Prainha, soon became the centre of a small fishing port. Gaspar Frutuoso, writing in his sixth volume of Saudades da Terra, referred to the area as São Mateus da Prainha, noting: "In addition to the church of São Mateus Além, is a small bay of white sand and small stones in places, where on occasion they throw-out their nets and trammels to catch many fish, principally mullet." It was Pedro de Merelim who first coined the name São Mateus da Prainha, in his chapter on the parish, in As 18 paróquias de Angra.

During the 1580s, in anticipation of eventual attacks by forces loyal to King Philip II of Spain, the first forts began to be constructed along the coast: six forts lined the banks of the parishes coast, which included the Grande Fort and the Fort of Negrito. They served the purpose of defending political activities in the archipelago, but also safeguarded the pillaging from pirates and privateers that occurred during this period (which was the justification for the construction of the Fort of the Terreiro, the Fort of the Maré, the Fort of Má Ferramenta and the Fort of São João (São Mateus da Calheta) (also known as the Fort of Biscoitinho). The final defences were completed during the Second World War, with the extension of trenches and installation of gun emplacements.

Father Manuel Luís Maldonado, writing in his work Fenix Nagrense, recounted the penitence of the peoples of the parish, as a sequence of the 26 March 1690 storm and 5 April 1690 earthquake. These accounts explain the strong relationship between the parish of São Mateus and São Bartolomeu de Regatos, and the existence of a parochial church in the vicinity of the old church, the reference to fishing and the level of poverty. Father António Cordeiro, writing in 1710 wrote of large estates, the coastal fortresses (some with more than 9 pieces of artillery), their garrisons and of the community of São Mateus "with more than 50 neighbours" spread across the territory. Cordeiro also wrote of the fishing: "...this bay in São Mateus, of white sand and small pebbles, where they catch a lot of fish, and salmonettes."

The primitive parochial church, constructed at Ponta de S. Mateus around 1557, would substitute the older chapel. During the construction, the people returned to the smaller Hermitage of Luz to complete the weekly rituals. The new church (today known as the Old Church) was completed in 1700, and functioned in that role until a 28 August 1893 hurricane when the church was destroyed and abandoned. Between 1694 and 1700 the church was demolished and reconstructed farther to the interior: a cross was left in the former churchyard. Writing in 1834, Luís de Meireles do Canto e Castro, a local resident, complained of the poor protection the seawall offered, resulting in repeated encroachments by the sea.

During the 18th century and early 19th century, the population grew rapidly and the first defensive structure began appearing along the Terreiro and beach near the port. After the 18th century the character of the parish began to change: the population grew and much of the economic activity moved away the orchards of the local estates.

== Geography ==
The civil parish occupies a small triangular territory along the southern coast of Terceira, confined in the south by the sea, west by the civil parish of São Bartolomeu de Regatos, northeast by Terra Chã and east by São Pedro.

=== Physical geography ===
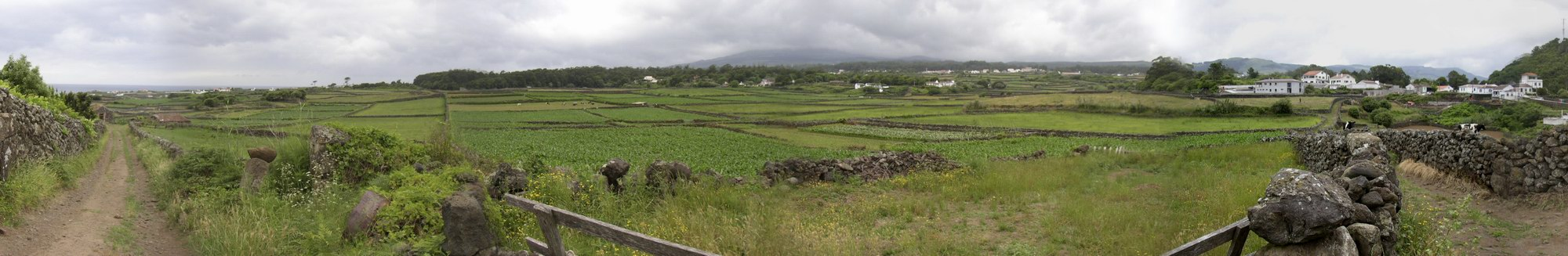
Panoramic view of a rural portion of São Mateus da Calheta in the interior

The territory extends through the transition al zone within the Santa Bárbara massif and volcanic complex of the Serra do Morião, in a zone that is relatively low, with a slope of less than five percent grade until 170 metres (560 ft) elevation, along a north-northwest tract. The highest point in the parish is situated in the extreme north of Canada da Cruz Dourada along Canada de Trás. In the central part of the territory is the basaltic spatter cone Pico dos Merens: its peak is named after one of the local families who, for centuries, were local property-owners in the region: the Merens of Távora. Also known as Pico de Merens or Pico do Alvernaz, the cone is 104 metres (341 ft) elevation, and responsible for the Biscoitinho Platform that extends to the sea.

The Biscoitinho Platform, over which the main built-up part of the civil parish is situated, terminates at small rectangular promontory 300 metres (980 ft) consisting of several coves and bays. One of these bays, which is relatively deep, provided shelter for early settlers from western and southwestern weather systems, giving rise to the port of São Mateus. Another cove to the west, which is wider and open to the sea, resulted in the settlement of Terreiro. To the east and west of the Biscoitinho Platform the coast is low, with altitudes less than 10 metres (33 ft), consisting of basalt primarily, with some pyroclasts. The exception is the zone of Ponta de São Mateus, near the old church, where the coast is covered in a thick layer of ignimbrites.

To the east of the port there two areas, Baía das Mercês and Poço da Luz, where the coast is almost level with the sea, and where stone beaches are common. Historically, there have been records of tsunamis or southerly swells that have inundated the areas (the last occurring on 18 February 2003), while the area the territory is delimited by wall to protect the roadway.

West, after the Calheta do Terreiro, the coast extends further into the sea, yet still only less than 10 metres (33 ft) above sea level, forming the tip of São Mateus. Being on the coast, the area is influenced by Atlantic storms, resulting in the construction of various barriers. In the small bay of Negrito, historically defended by the Fort of Negrito and location of a former whaling port, are the principal swimming areas on the island. After Negrito is the western limit of the civil parish in the area known as Chanoca, an area of basalt cliffs with difficult access.

=== Human geography ===
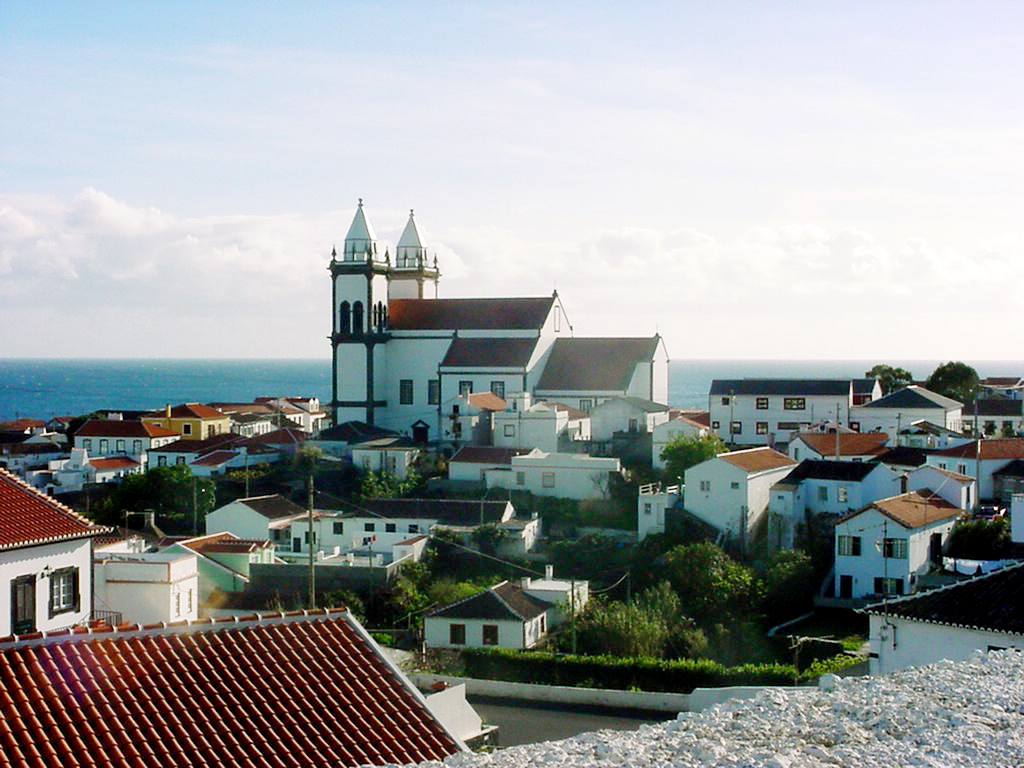
The parochial church is at the centre of the old fishing community of São Mateus.

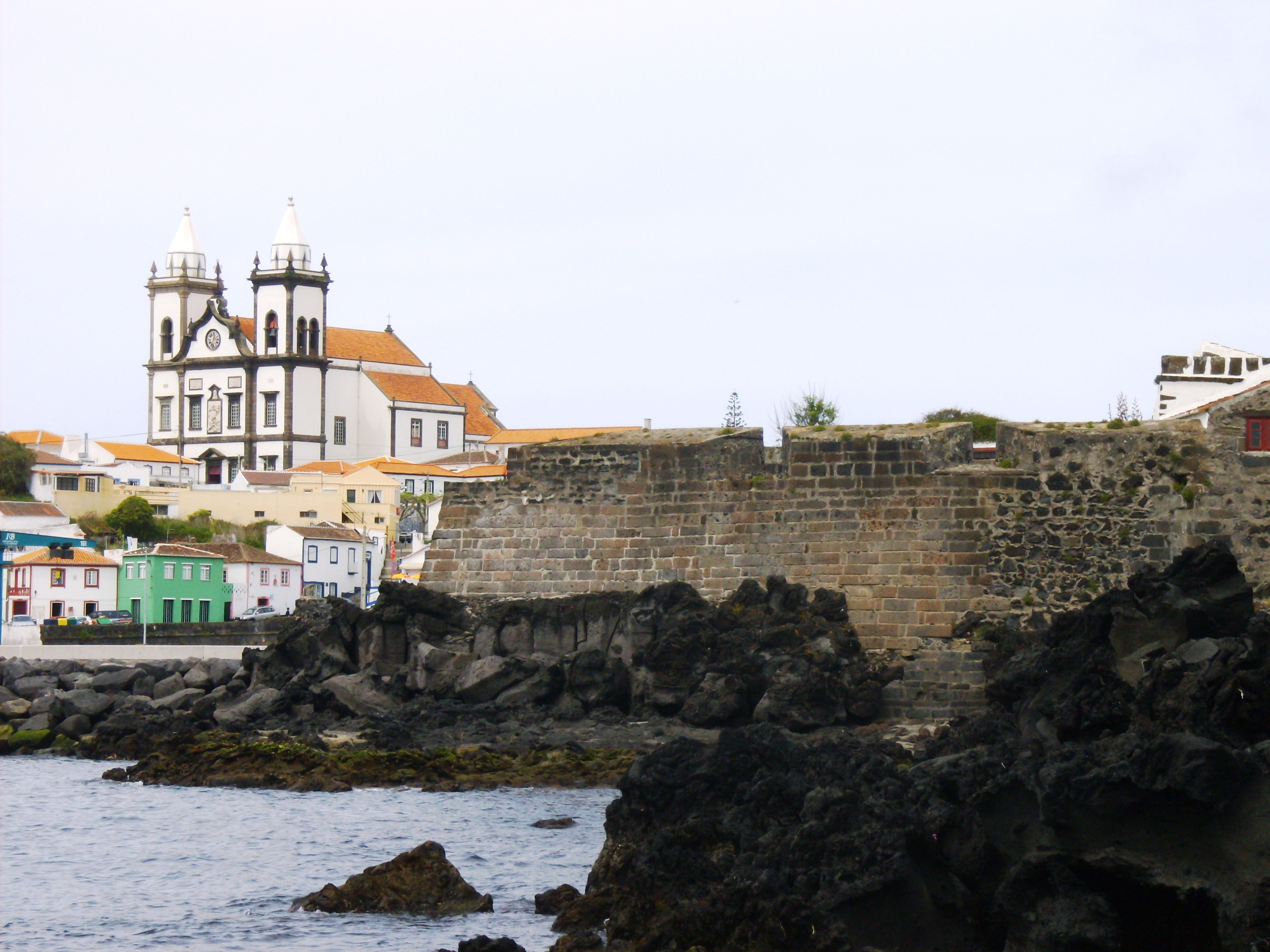
A juxtoposition of the parochial church and the Fort Grande

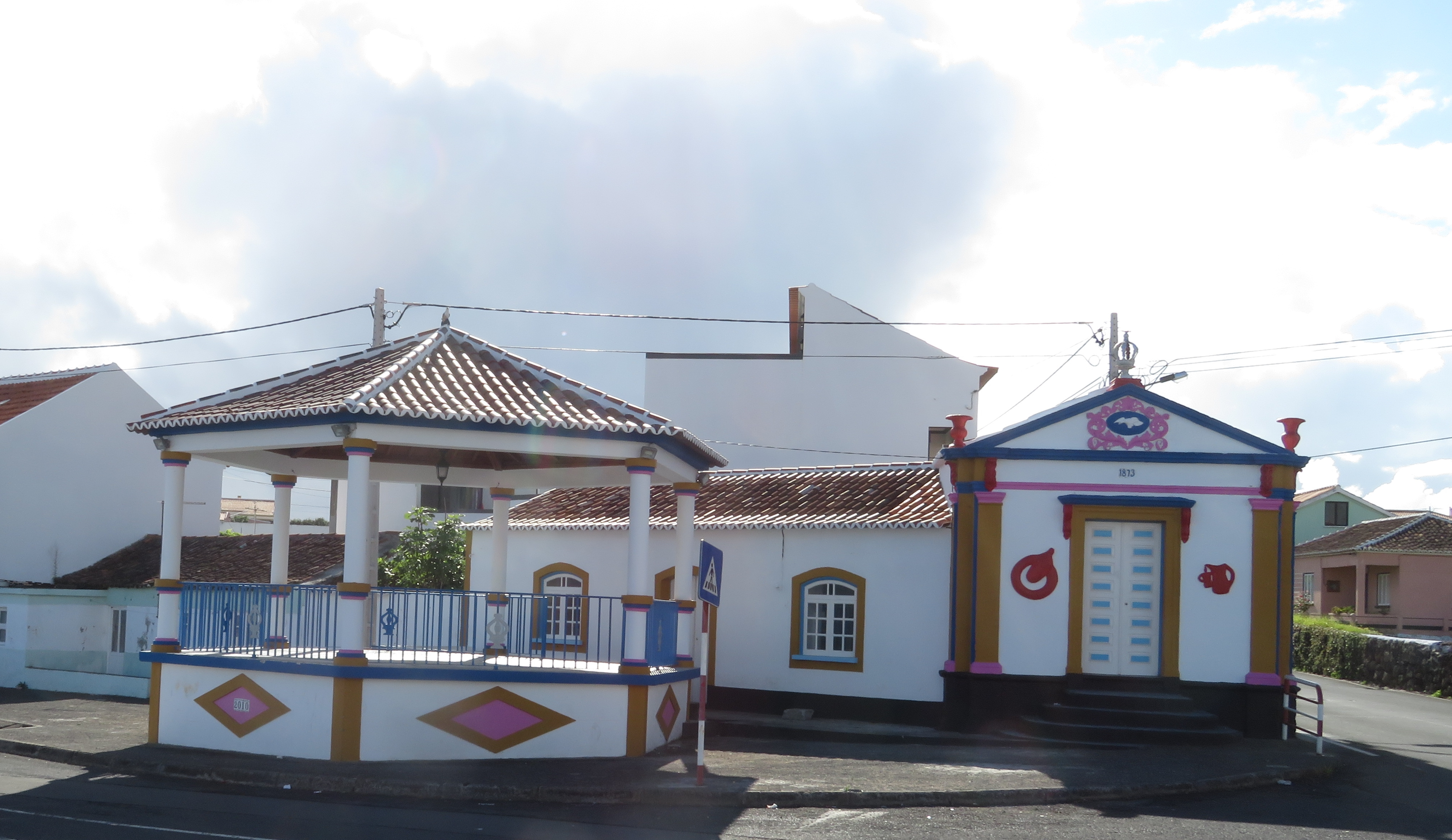
Holy Spirit Chapel

The structure of São Mateus is different from other parishes in the southwest corner of Terceira, with a specific economy associated with fishing and services. While the upper regions of the parish has marked by rural character, the central area is primarily urban, centred around the parochial church and fishing community. The parish contains the localities Bairro Novo, Canada da Cruz Dourada, Canada da Igreja, Canada do Capitão Mor, Canada do Pombal, Canada dos Calços, Canada dos Folhadais, Canada Francesa, São Mateus and Terra Pão. These 50 named agglomerations are connected by a patchwork of linear roadways extending from the Estrada Regional E.R.1-1ª, organized into:

- São Mateus — the main village, centred on Biscoitinho and port, includes a dense urban concentration with numerous roads and cul de sacs, characterized by the homes of the poor and fishermen. Towards the west the agglomeration abruptly terminates at Terreiro, limited by the zone of Arrife, which is almost underpopulated, except for the homes of the early gentry and noble classes of Angra. In the east, towards Angra do Heroísmo, the urban area extends along the coast, broken by the Fortress of São Mateus da Calheta, towards the social housing of the Bairro dos Pescadores constructed during the Estado Novo regime. The construction of social housing in Terreiro, the periphery of the Bairro dos Pescadores and beginning of the Canada da Arruda resulted in a high urban density, giving the parish the character of an extension of Angra. In the extreme east of the parish, in the zone between Poço da Luz and the border with São Pedro, are many of the 18th and 19th century estates that pertained to the aristocratic families of Terceira;
- Cantinho — this is the secondary urban agglomeration of the parish, characterized by linear growth along the route between Angra and São Bartolomeu dos Regatos (known as the Caminho do Meio). Its center is situated at the Hermitage of São Francisco das Almas, a name that once served as the toponymic reference, but actually includes Entre-Ladeiras, Terra do Pão and Canada da Francesa. It is a zone that is markedly rural, inhabited by farmers and similar to the parishes of the western part of the island, and socially separate from the rest of the parish, with its own primary school, império and parochial churches.;
- The Canadas — connecting the coastal roadway (or Caminho de Baixo) with the Angra-São Bartolomeu dos Regatos access (Caminho do Meio) are several secondary lines of residences known as Canadas da Luz, da Arruda, do Capitão-Mor and da Cruz Dourada, that were extended linearly along these roads. These were transitional spaces, lightly populated, between the coastal fishing communities and their rural interior. These Canadas were transformed into new extensions of Angra, as bedroom communities.

== Architecture ==
=== Military ===
- Fort of Negrito (Portuguese: Forte de Negrito)
- Fortress of São Mateus da Calheta (Portuguese: Forte Grande de São Mateus)
- Fort of the Church of São Mateus da Calheta (Portuguese: Forte da Igreja de São Mateus da Calheta)

=== Religious ===
- Church of São Mateus da Calheta (Portuguese: Igreja Paroquial de São Mateus da Calheta/Igreja de São Mateus)
- Church of São Mateus da Calheta (Old) (Portuguese: Igreja Velha de São Mateus da Calheta), dating to the mid 16th-century, the Igreja Velha (Old Church) was built to replace the old hermitage of Nossa Senhora da Luz, but its location (along the coast) made it susceptible to winter storms and hurricanes; on 28 August 1893, it was hit by a hurricane resulting in the destruction of most of its roof, and its eventual abandon. It was replaced by the main parochial church.
- Império do Espírito Santo do Cantinho
- Império do Espírito Santo do Terreiro
- Império do Espíritu Santo de São Mateus da Calheta, a Holy Spirit Chapel dating from 1873
