= Old Church of São Mateus da Calheta =

Church of São Mateus da Calheta
- Church of Saint Mathew
- Igreja de São Mateus da Calheta
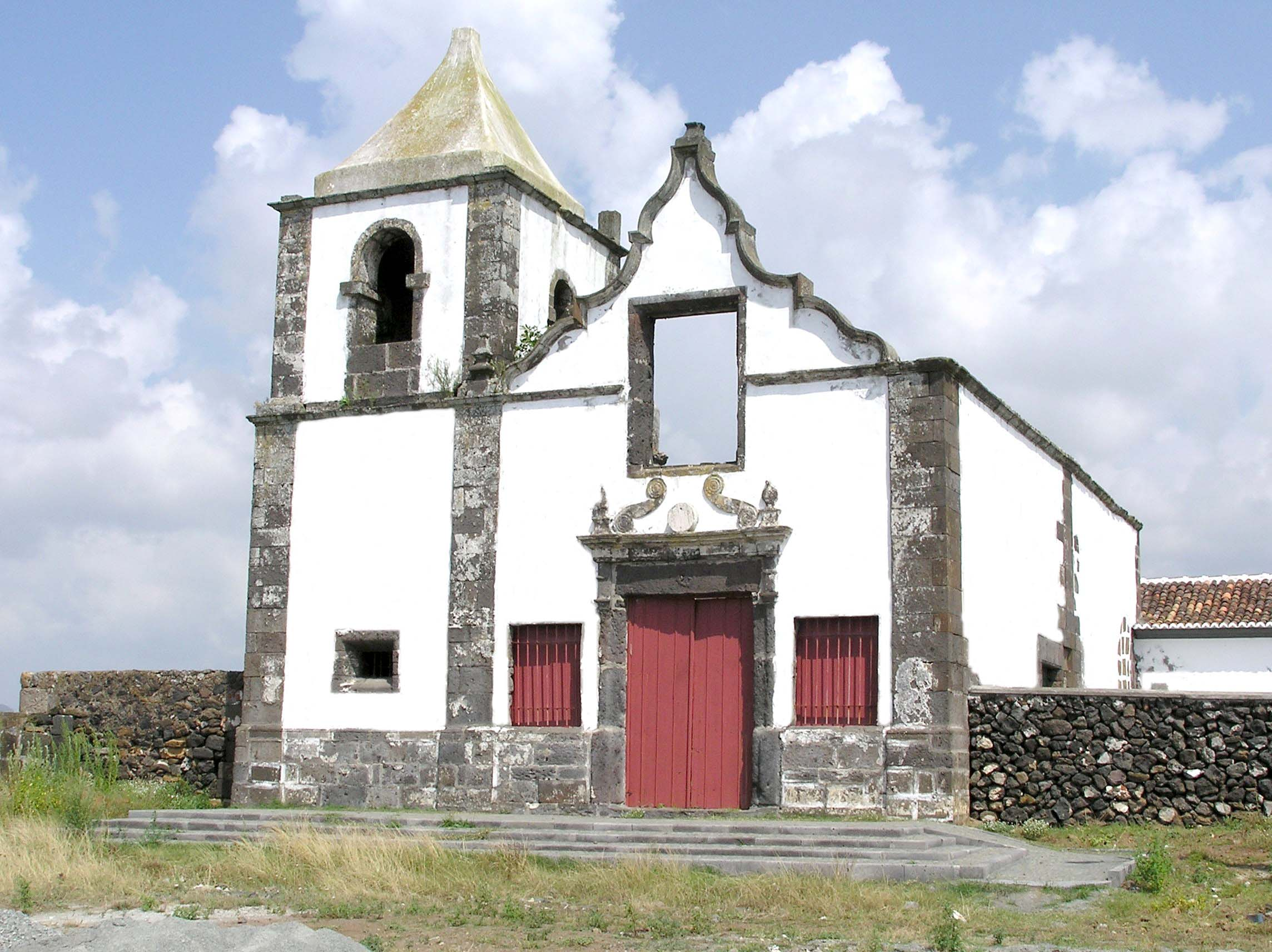
- Front facade of the old church of São Mateus da Calheta

- Location within Terceira
- 38°39′11.88″N 27°16′32.07″W
- Location: Terceira, Central, Azores
- Country: Portugal

History
- Dedication: Matthew the Apostle

Architecture
- Style: Medieval

Specifications
- Length: 11.65 m (38.2 ft)
- Width: 27.13 m (89.0 ft)

The (Old) Church of São Mateus da Calheta (Portuguese: Igreja Velha de São Mateus da Calheta) are the ruins of a 16th-century church located along the coast of the civil parish of São Mateus da Calheta, municipality of Angra do Heroísmo, on the Portuguese island of Terceira, in the archipelago of the Azores. The church was abandoned after hurricane damage.

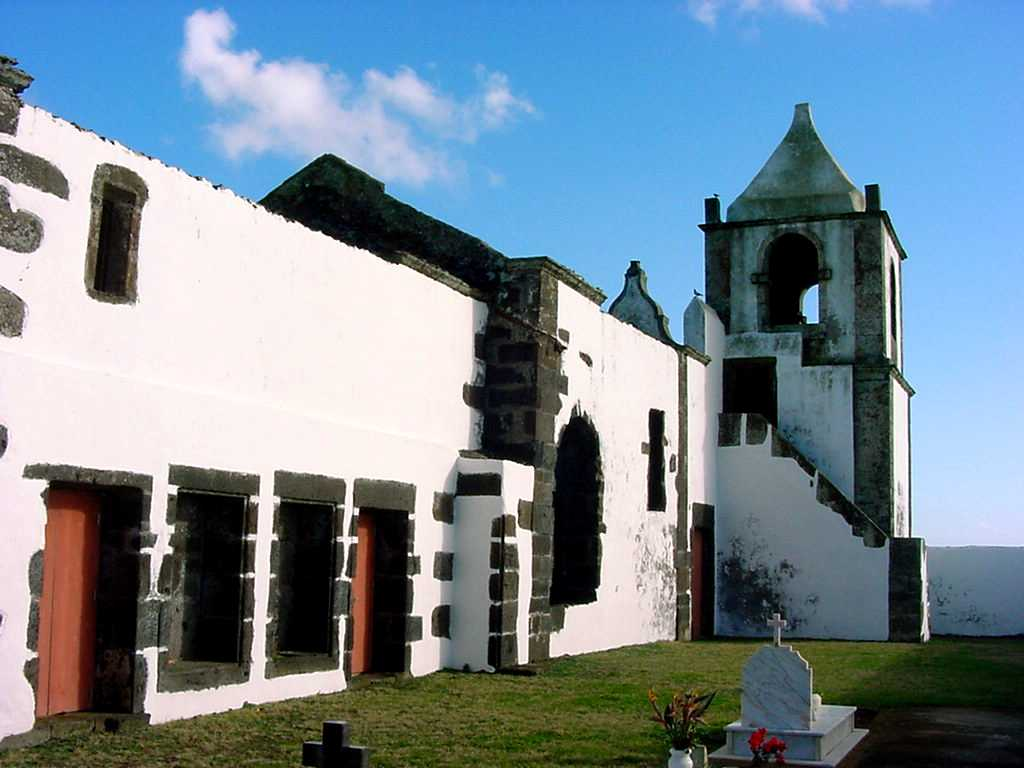
Igreja Velha de São Mateus da Calheta

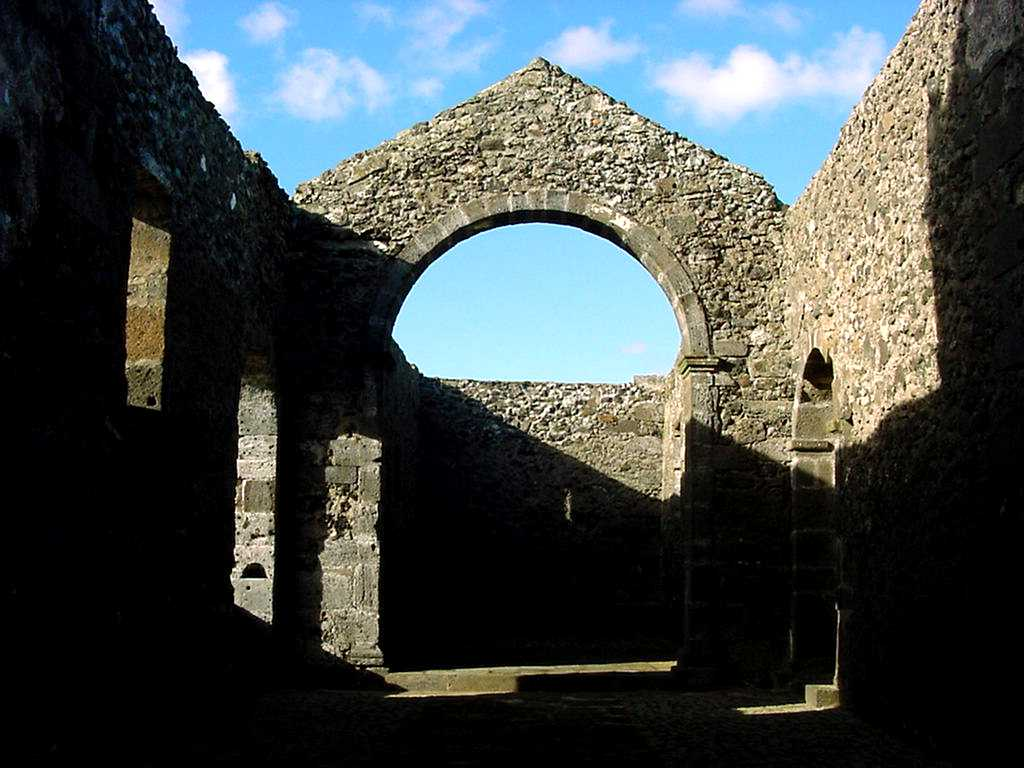
Central arcade of the altar and chancel, made of basalt stone

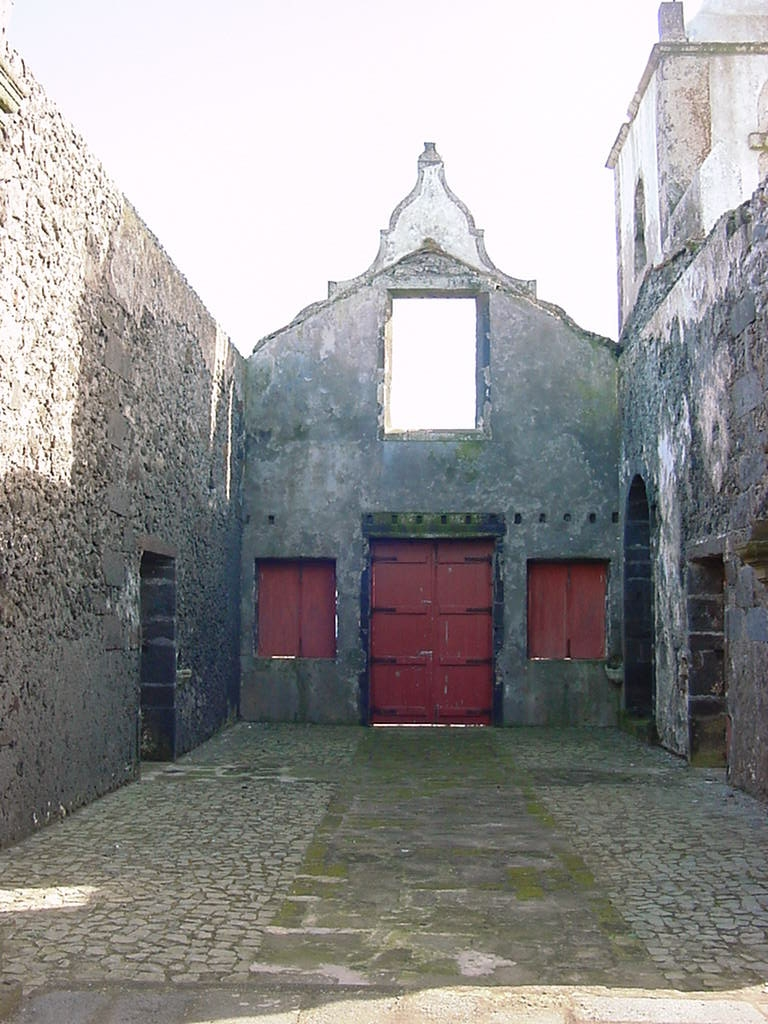
Interior cavity facing the front entrance
