= Fortress of São Mateus da Calheta =

Fort in Terceira in the Azores

- Forte Grande de São Mateus da Calheta
- Terceira, Central, name=Azores in Portugal
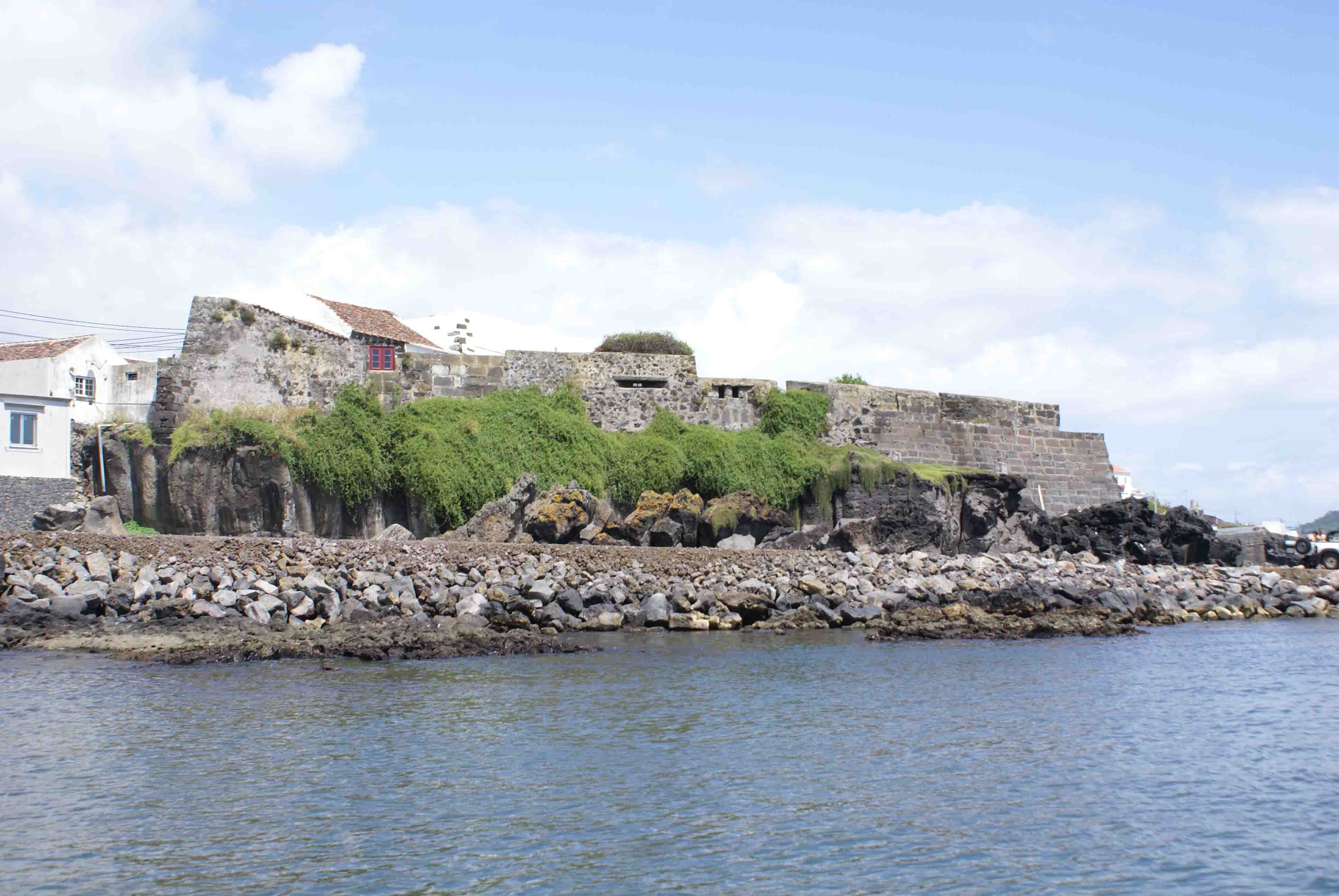
- The main profile of the Great Fort of São Mateus da Calheta, showing many of the emplacements and deteriorated walls

Site information
- Type: Fort
- Owner: Portuguese Republic
- Operator: Junta de Freguesia de São Mateus da Calheta; Centro de Estudos do Mar e Núcleo Museológico do Mar; headquarters of the folklore group Modas da Nossa Terra
- Open to the public: Public

Location
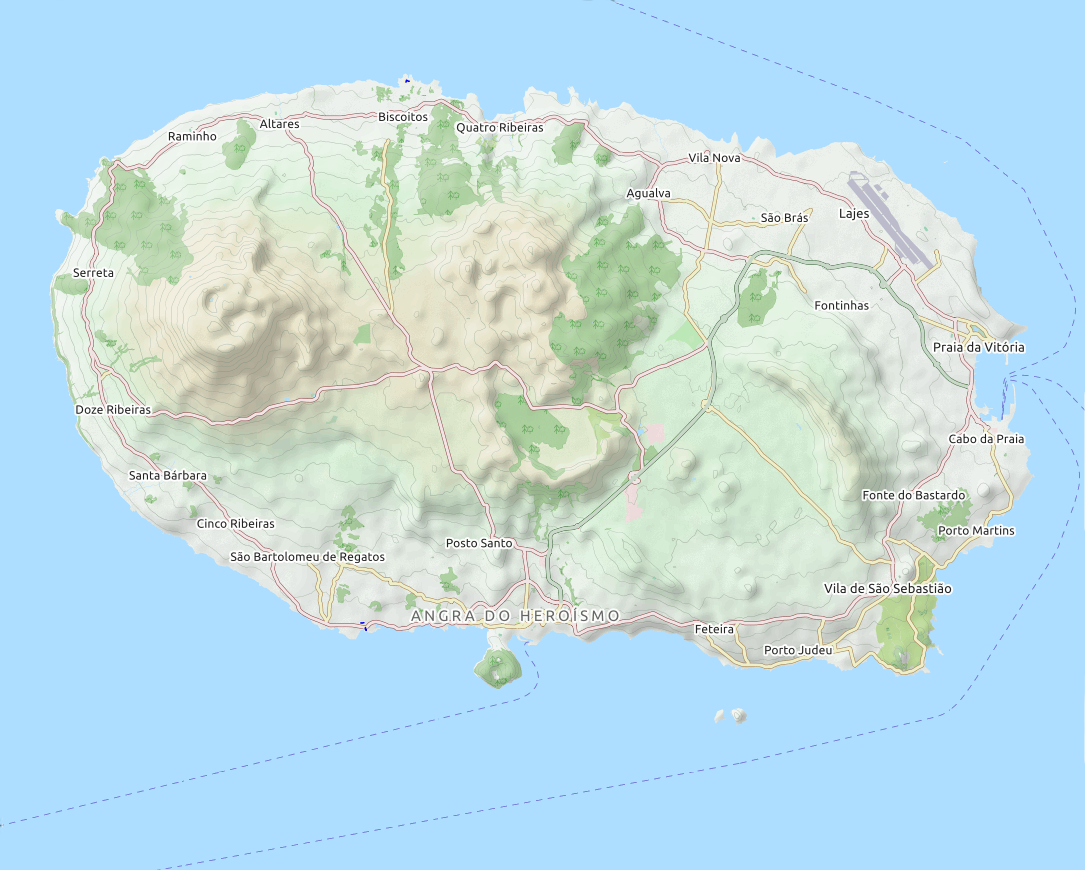
- Location of the fort within the municipality of Angra do Heroísmo
- Coordinates: 38°39′24.30″N 27°15′57.69″W

Site history
- Built: 16th century
- Materials: Basalt, Wood, Tile

Fortress of São Mateus da Calheta (Portuguese: Forte Grande de São Mateus da Calheta) is a fort in the civil parish of São Mateus da Calheta, in the municipality of Angra do Heroísmo, island of Terceira, in the Portuguese archipelago of the Azores.

== History ==
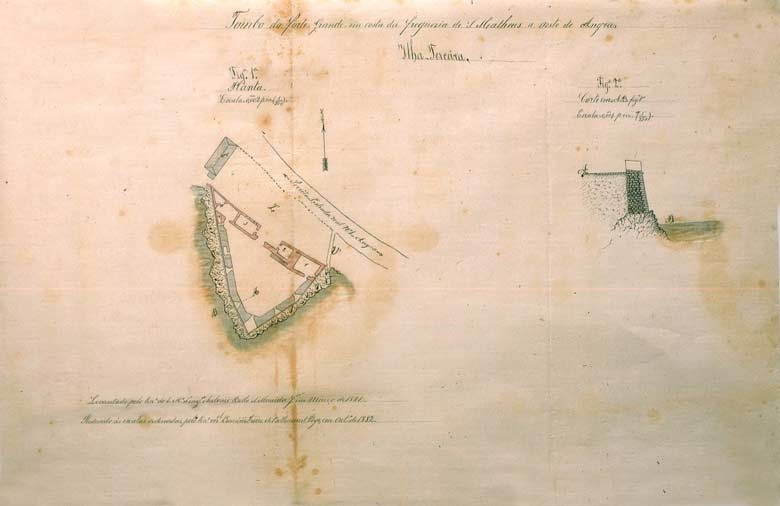
Late 19th century design of the fort

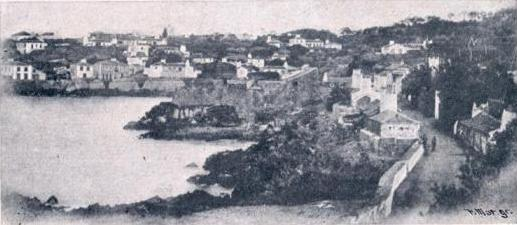
A view of the Fort in 1903, showing how the fort extended into the sea

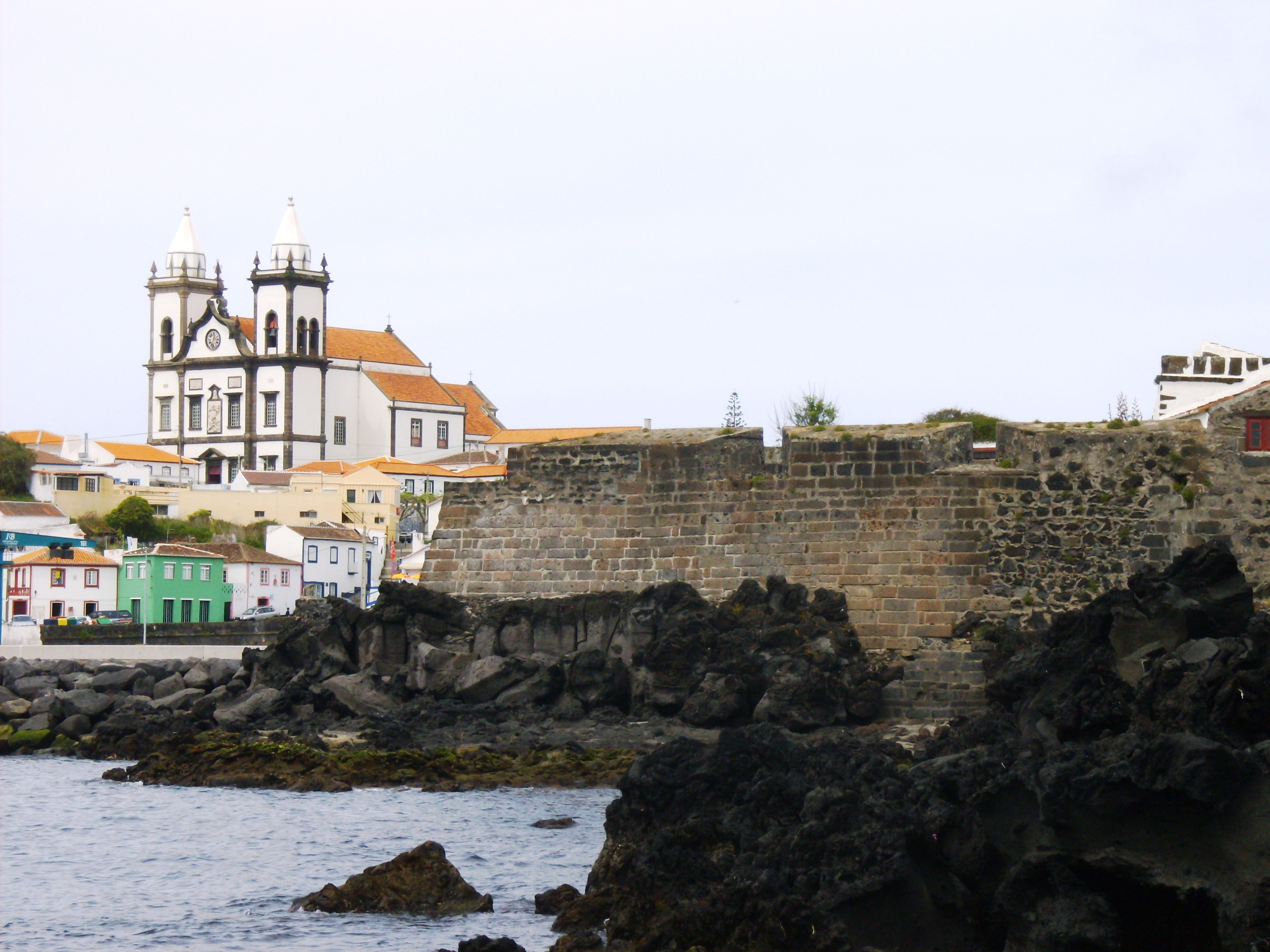
A foreground perspective of the fort, with the Church of São Mateus da Calheta in the background

Construction of the fort of São Mateus began in 1581, after the Portuguese succession crisis of 1580, under the determination of the Corregidor of the Azores, Ciprião de Figueiredo e Vasconcelos. This fort was part of a larger plan for the defense of the island drawn out by engineer Tommaso Benedetto de Pesaro, in 1567, after an attack by the French corsair Pierre Bertrand de Montluc in Funchal (October 1566), and attempt/failure by pirates to seize Angra in the same year.

It was in the shadow of the fort, that the carracks from Indian trade routes would appear, making landfall for the first time.

With the installation of the Captaincy General of the Azores, its state was described in the following terms (1767):

Fort of Prainha of São Mateus. This is the largest (of the redoubt fortresses) that are on the west of the city of Angra and remodeled anew. It has six canons and requires another two and another six...another two with its emplacements and to garrison eight artillerymen and two auxiliaries.

It was referred to as Forte da Praya de S. Matheus, in the report Revista aos fortes que defendem a costa da ilha Terceira, by adjutant Manoel Correa Branco (1776), who indicated, ...it is the best on the coast. This fort was rebuilt, and does not require reconstruction.

In 1767, in his Revista dos Fortes (Review of Forts), engineer/sergeant major João António Júdice, conducted a review and expansion under orders from the Captain-General of the Azores; in his plans he referred to the fort as the largest located to the west of the city of Angra. At that time, the fort was protected by between six and eight artillery pieces and 32 auxiliaries; it had six canons, equipped with pieces in steel, all in good condition. He concluded that the fort's artillery should be reinforced with two cannons and their respective equipment.

By the beginning of the 19th century, José Rodrigo de Almeida, developed a plan that included six cannons, each three in directed to the sea.

Between 1828 and 1834, the fort took on a great importance during the defense of the island, owing to the Civil War, when Terceira became the headquarters of the Regency supporting Queen Maria II. During this time (1830), the fort's plan was reinforced by José Rodrigo de Almeida.

The Baron of Basto, writing on the fort's condition, described it In good state. It is likely conserved owing to it being the more important along the coast; there are five canon emplacements, an area of five fathom squared, lodging for 20 squares, magazine and storehouse.

By 1871, the fort was at the disposition of the Ministry of War (Portuguese: Ministério da Guerra) and summarily given to a veteran, so that he could reside with his family. Later, it was used to house the needy. Yet, by 1881, an area of approximately 483 meters squared was added to the fort, likely by the Ministry of War.

The fort, under little need, was given over to the Junta Freguesia of São Mateus, in order to stage open-air concerts and cinema in the 20th century. It was during this century that the first remodeling was attempted, with work carried out by the municipal council of Angra do Heroísmo. In 2010, the area around the land-side portion of the fort was remodeled in order to appeal to tourism.

== Architecture ==
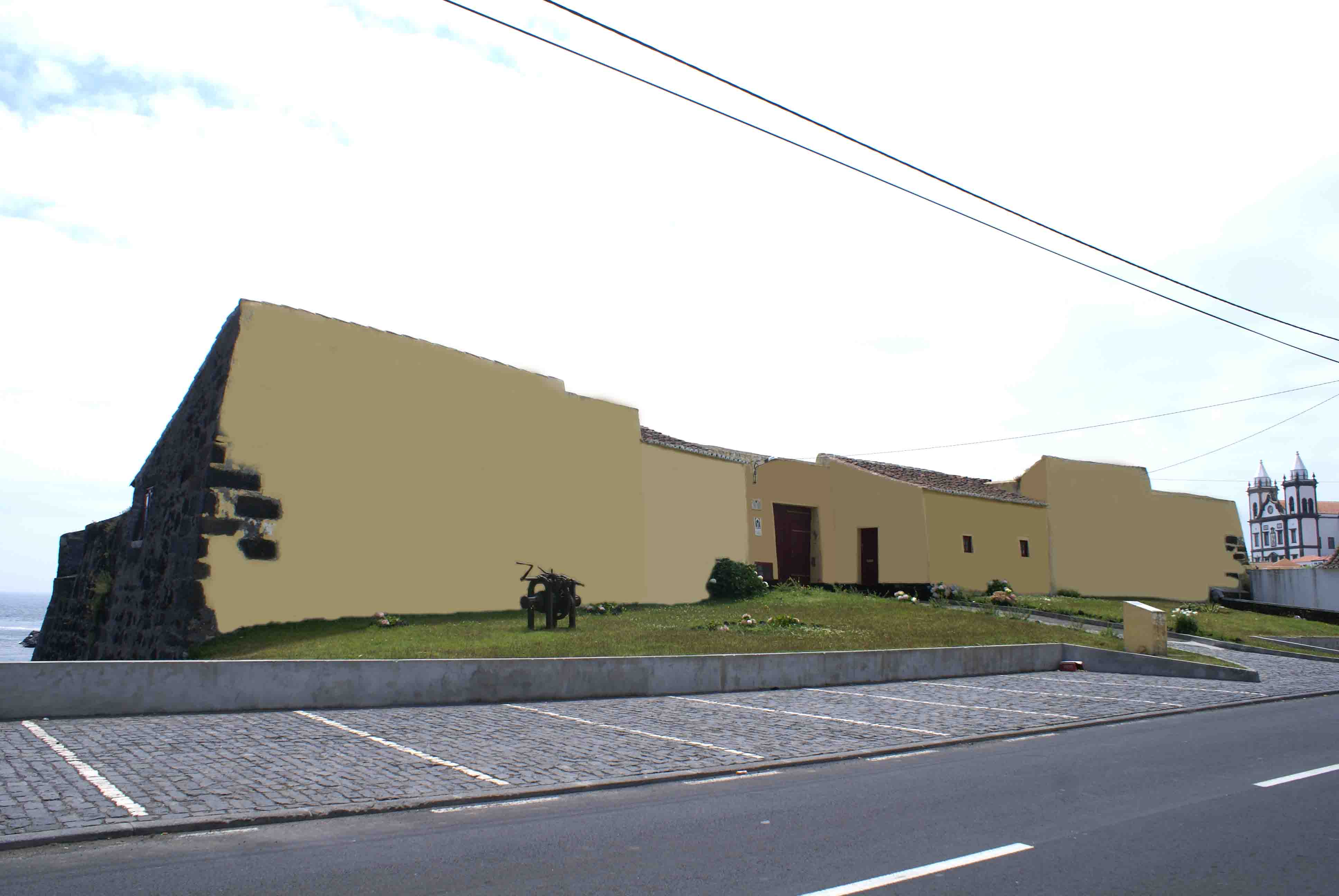
The main facade and gate of the fort

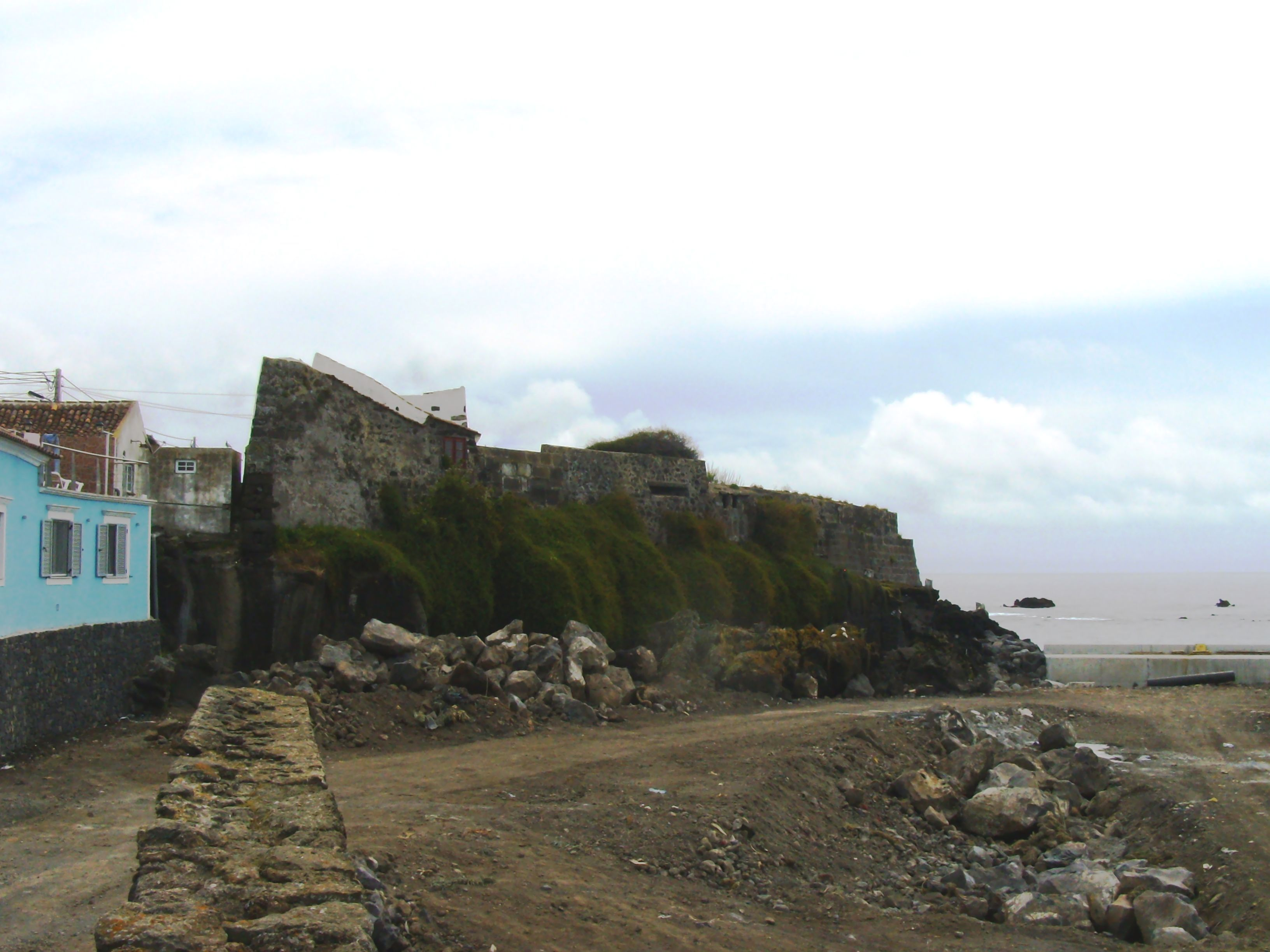
The deteriorated condition of the main walls of the fort

A maritime fort, it is located approximately 4 kilometres (2.5 mi) west of the city of Angra do Heroísmo, along the Prainha de São Mateus, the most important southerly port on the island, as well as the principal commercial fishing port. The fort is located on a cliff formation, almost at the level of the sea, and adapted to the accented relief. To its north is the principal roadway.

The strong fortification is integrated into a wider system, located along the southern coast, consisting of six redoubts that protected the parish. Constructed to defend the harbor, the fort created a crossfire zone with Fort of Biscoitinho and the Fort of Má Ferramenta. Structurally, the fort consisted of a triangle pointing towards the sea, and two half bastions facing uneven ground. Of these bastions, one was very acute and the other almost rectangular, with the internal battery.

Contiguous with the fort, to the west, is a small defensive curtain, that some authors consider to be the remains of the fabled Reduto do Poço, still referenced by the end of the 18th century.
