= Church of São Mateus da Calheta =

Church of São Mateus
- Church of Saint Mathew
- Igreja de São Mateus
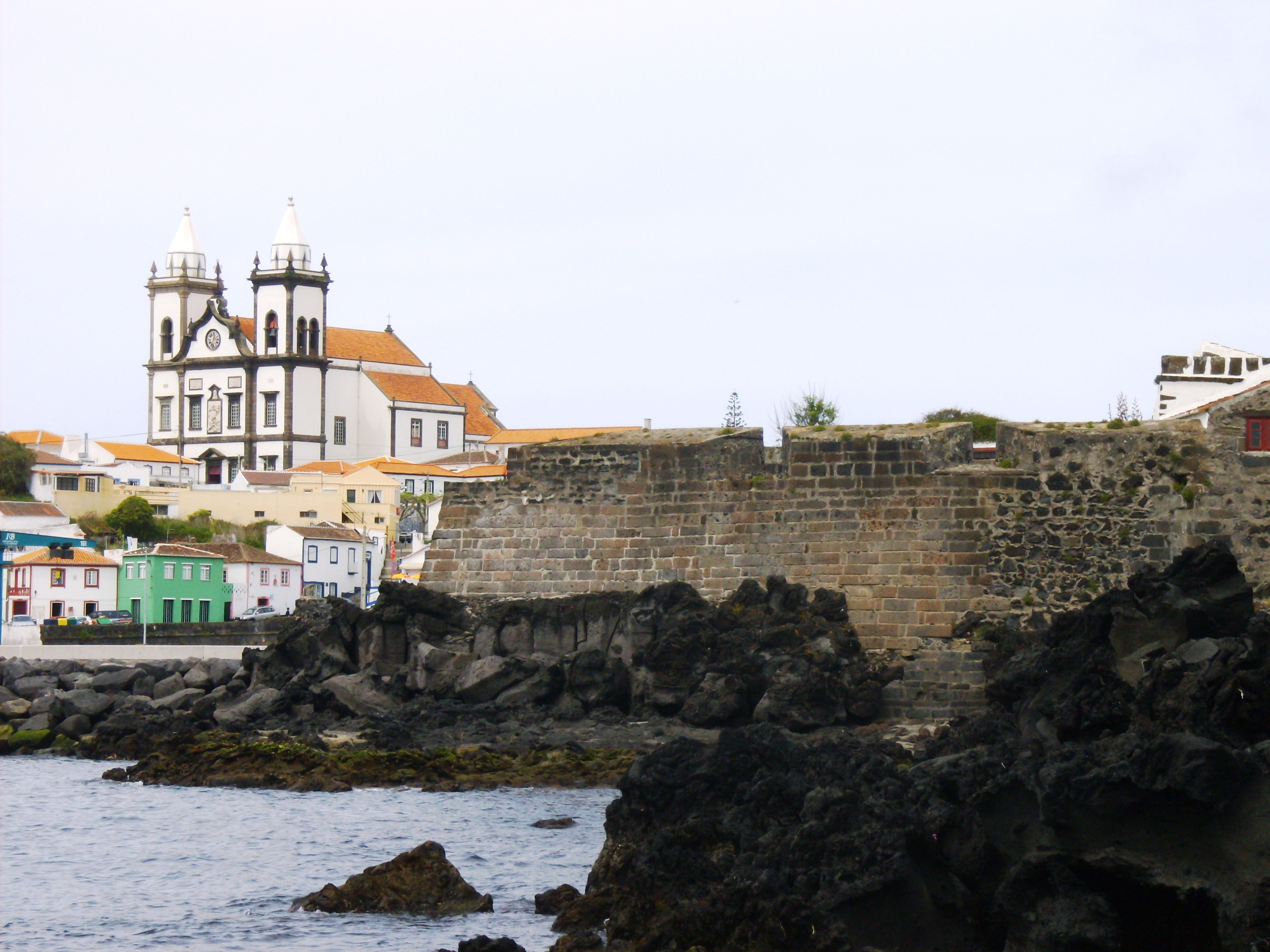
- A view of the Church of São Mateus from the fort of São Mateus

- Location of the church in the municipality of Angra do Heroísmo
- 38°39′24.62″N 27°16′11.93″W
- Location: Terceira, Central, Azores
- Country: Portugal
- Denomination: Roman Catholic

Architecture
- Architect: António Baía Paixão
- Style: Baroque

Specifications
- Length: 46.25 m (151.7 ft)
- Width: 25.72 m (84.4 ft)

Administration
- Diocese: Diocese of Angra

The Church of São Mateus (Portuguese: Igreja de São Mateus) is a Baroque church in the civil parish of São Mateus da Calheta, in the municipality of Angra do Heroísmo, in the Portuguese archipelago of the Azores. The church is the major rural temple on the island of Terceira, and one of the larger churches in the Azores. Apart from its apparent volume, the church is marked by several carvings on its main facade, that include the three of the Cardinal Virtues, while its two lateral bell towers are unique in the archipelago for their size and pyramidal spires.

== History ==
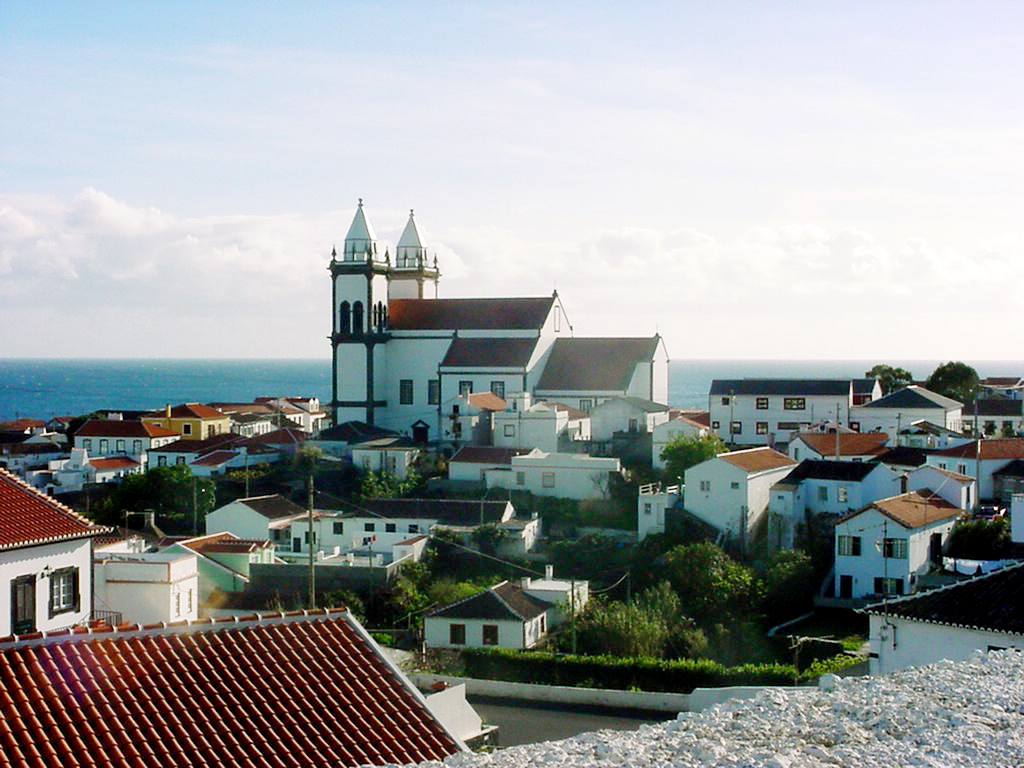
A view of the New Church of São Mateus, above the homes of the parish

The first nucleus of the community settled in the area of Poço da Luz, in the 15th century, then a low and marshy area, separated from the sea by a coastal barrier of boulders built by the tide. The first documented reference to the existence of a church came from Pedro Cota da Malha on 6 February 1557, then a resident of Quinta da Prainha. He verified that the Church was in construction in the Ponta de São Mateus.

In 1560, the settlement was elevated to the status of ecclesiastical parish, and the first reference for the new parish of São Mateus da Prainha in 1568. But, it was only in 1641 that the first records were issued by the parish.

Yet, between 1694 and 1700, the Church was demolished and reconstructed in the interior, while a cross was erected in the church courtyard to represent the place of the old chancel. Friar Agostinho de Monte Alverne, writing in 1695, stated that the parish included a vicar and treasurer serving a community of 100 buildings and approximately 250 residents. By 1700, the church building project was concluded, it would later be referred to as the Old Church (Portuguese: Igreja Velha). On 28 August 1893, this Church was hit by a tempest, leaving it roofless and causing its abandon.

On 21 September 1895, the cornerstone was placed to launch the building of a new church on land donated by a benefactor, in the interior of the community and away from the sea. The project was authored by António Baía Paixão, a functionary in the Office of Public Works in Angra (Portuguese: Obras Públicas de Angra), with the assistance of Father Manuel Maria da Costa. It was the largest project for the period and covered an area of 820 square metres (8,800 ft^{2}): the largest rural temple on Terceira and one of the largest in the Azores. For that reason, it had many critics who protested its construction until its completion (and even after). In the magazine O Tempo of Angra, journalist Gil Vaz lionized its construction, stating:

"Breaking the beauty of the landscape, a monster exists on the rock, colossal and slothish, between the white of the village and breathtaking blue of the cove. It is the new church of São Mateus. That temple deformed and arrogant gives me the impression of an insult to small houses that surround it, the working classes who inhabit."

A similar opinion was manifested by the author Raul Brandão, who in his celebrated "Ilhas Desconhecidas", discoursed on the contrast between the opulence of the church and the poverty of its community.

The final project was concluded in 1911, after the tragic death of the project's coordinator. Even with a one million escudos subsidy from the government, and several donations from the community, the project still was over budget, coming in at approximately 46,295,277 escudos. On 4 June 1911 (Pentecost Sunday) the Church was blessed by Canon Antonio Maria Ferreira, proto-notary apostolic ad instar, then titular vicar sede vacante, since tensions between the fledgling Republican regime and Vatican did not permit the nomination of bishops.

Lastly, the bells in the belfry were acquired in 1922.

== Architecture ==
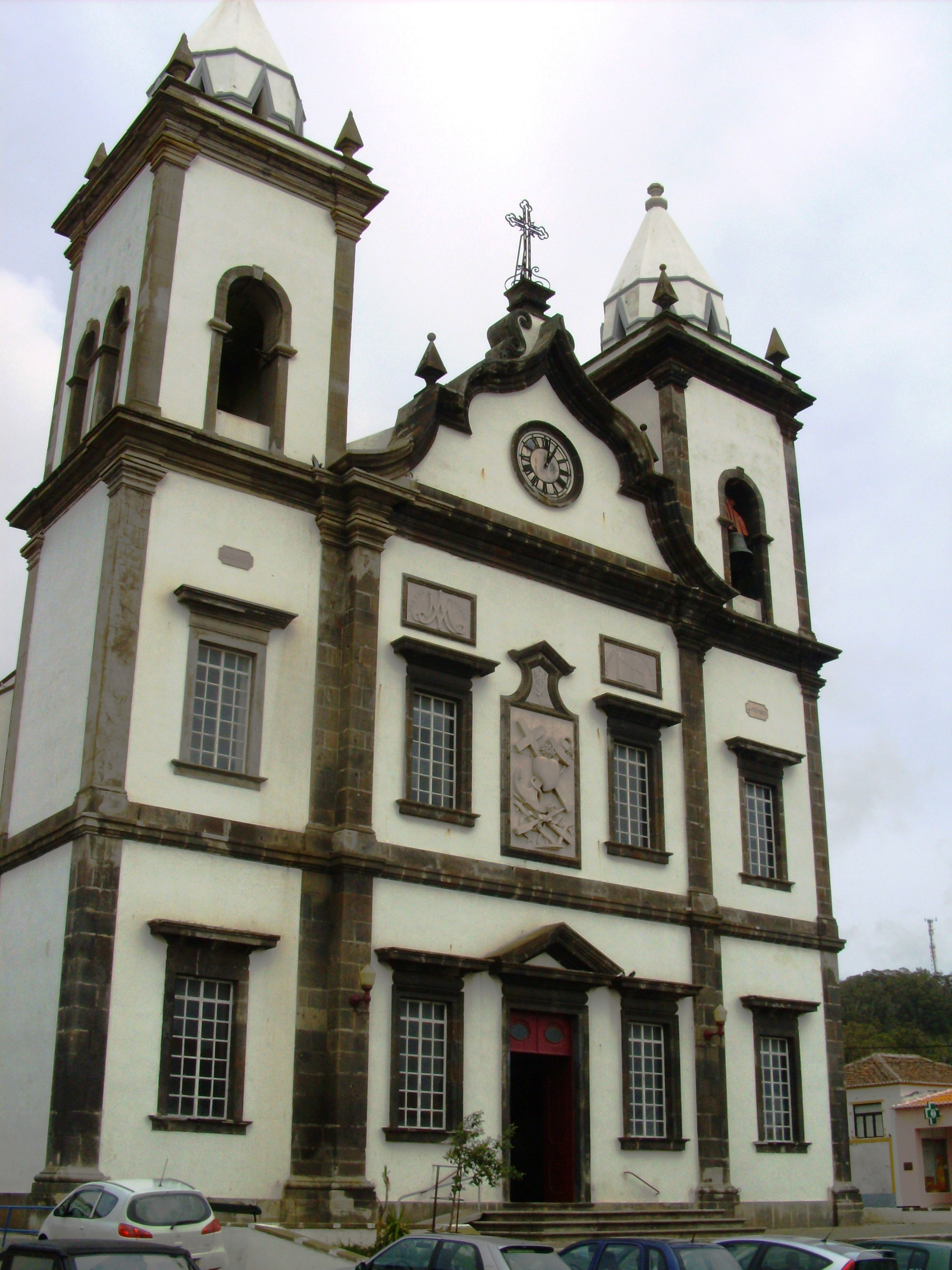
The three-storey main facade of the rural Church of São Mateus

The contemporary church is located within the urban interior of the settlement of São Mateus da Calheta, inserted into a courtyard adapted from an inclined parcel. It is circled by roadways, with pedestrian crossing on all its sides. To the front is a square, now used for public parking, with a portal preceding a staircase.

The three-storey rectangular church consists of a single nave and narrow presbytery, flanked by lateral bodies, and a principal facade consisting of double rectangular bell towers. These spaces are deferentially scaled with tiled gable roofs, including one annex, while simple faceted spires have been erected on the bell towers (painted white). The walls are plastered and white-washed, with the main floor, corners, pilasters, friezes, cornices and frames in black stone.

The church is oriented to the southeast, with its main facade finished in an ornamented pediment, that includes a central circular clock, and crowned by an iron Latin cross above a gabled plinth and parallel elliptical scrolls, with lateral pinnacles. Consisting of two registers, the church is divided by cornices and friezes: by three rectilinear lines, with frames surmounted by convex friezes, linear cornices and windows with sills. Surmounting the main door is a triangular pediment and a rectangular framed panel showing symbols representing the three cardinal virtues below a backrest and angular cornice. This tympanum of the central panel has the inscription SUPER THESAUROS ALCISFUIT 1 Par. C.XXVII 25. Within each framed panel are rectangular framed windows, with the two central superior windows surmounted by framed cartouches. On the left cartouche is the AVE monogram, with the inscription ORA PRO NOBIS, while the right cartouche, with a carved open book, has the inscription QUABRITO PRIMUM REGNUM DEI. Over the windows on the second register of each bell tower are the inscriptions 21-IX-1895 (on the left) and 4-VI-1911 (on the right).

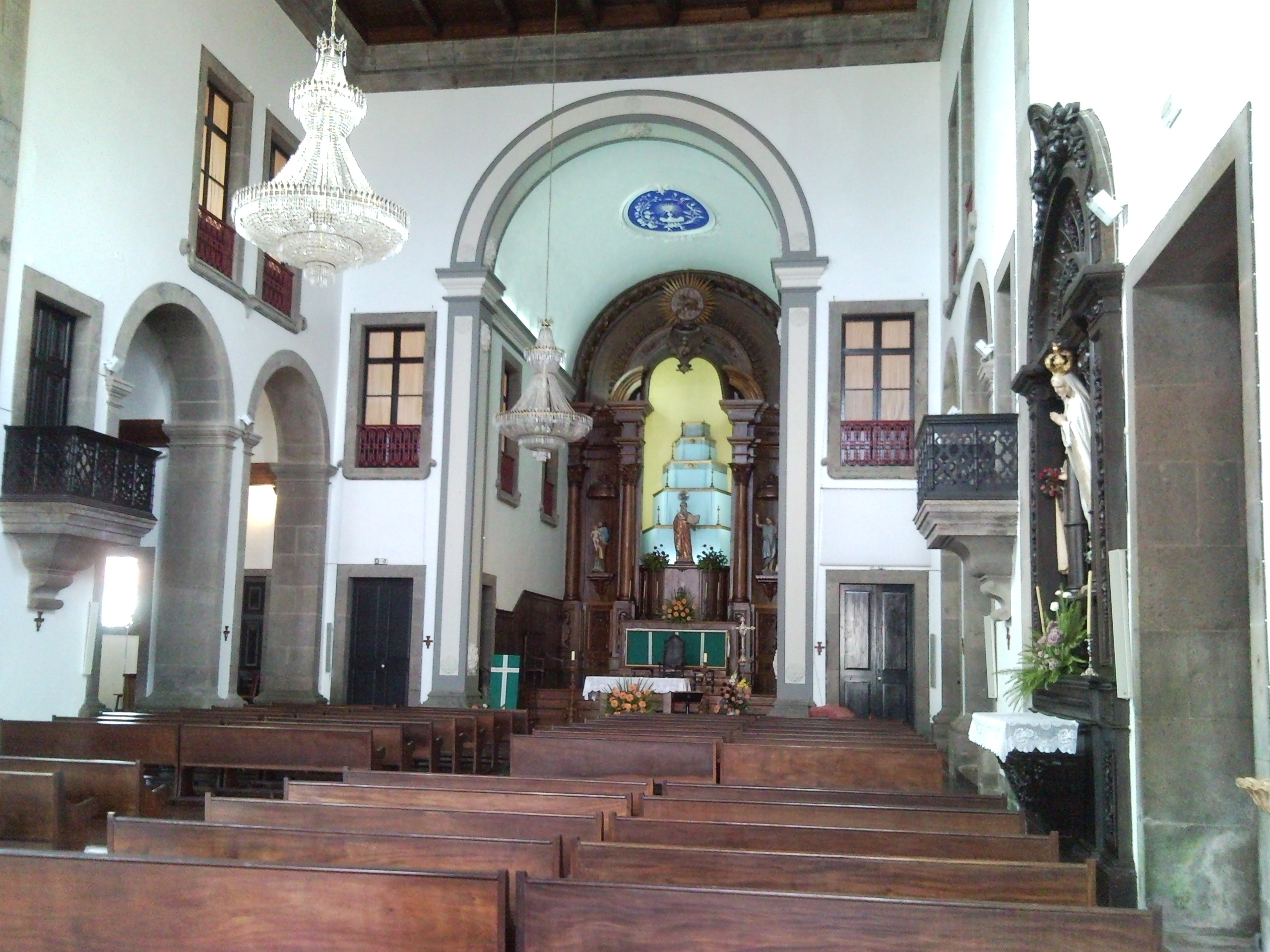
The interior of the Church show the main altar and one of the six lateral retables

Sensibly recessed from the main facade, the three-story towers are separated by cornices and friezes, with the two inferior floors occupied by rectangular windows, and the third register occupied by the belfry, with Roman Arch and flanked by pilasters. The lateral facade of the bell towers have narrower arches, while the posterior facades include three narrower arches. On top of the belfry are pyramidal pinnacles on each tower corner, while a multi-faceted pyramidal spire tops each tower.

The lateral facades are decorated with cornices surmounted by ledge, with each side of the nave marked by two rectangular windows and transversal door topped by a triangular pediment, and on the first floor of the annex spaces are windows oriented to southeast and northwest respectively, while the second floor windows are oriented to the east and west. The spaces abutting the presbytery, are marked by two or three windows depending on the number of floors. The rear facade terminates in a gable and is crowned by an iron Latin cross, while a rectangular window covers the end of the nave, while the presbytery includes a rectangular and circular oculus. The annexes also include rectangular doors.

The interior includes seven retables.
