= Angra do Heroísmo City Hall =

- Paços do Concelho de Angra do Heroísmo
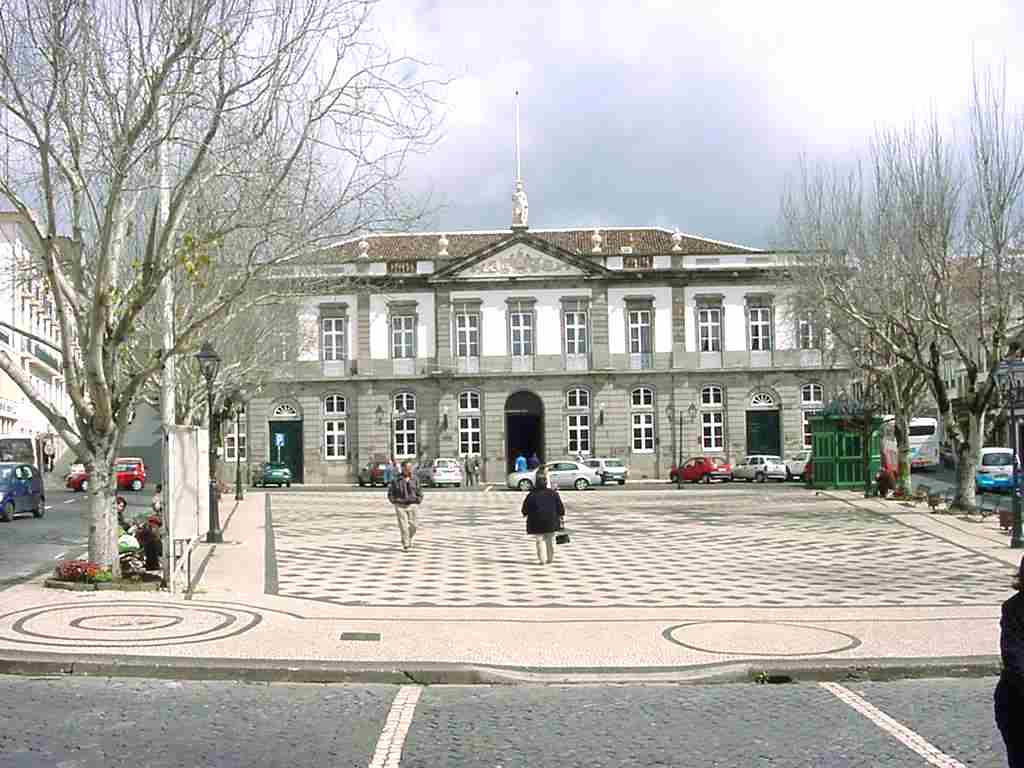
- A view of the municipal palace in front of the municipal square

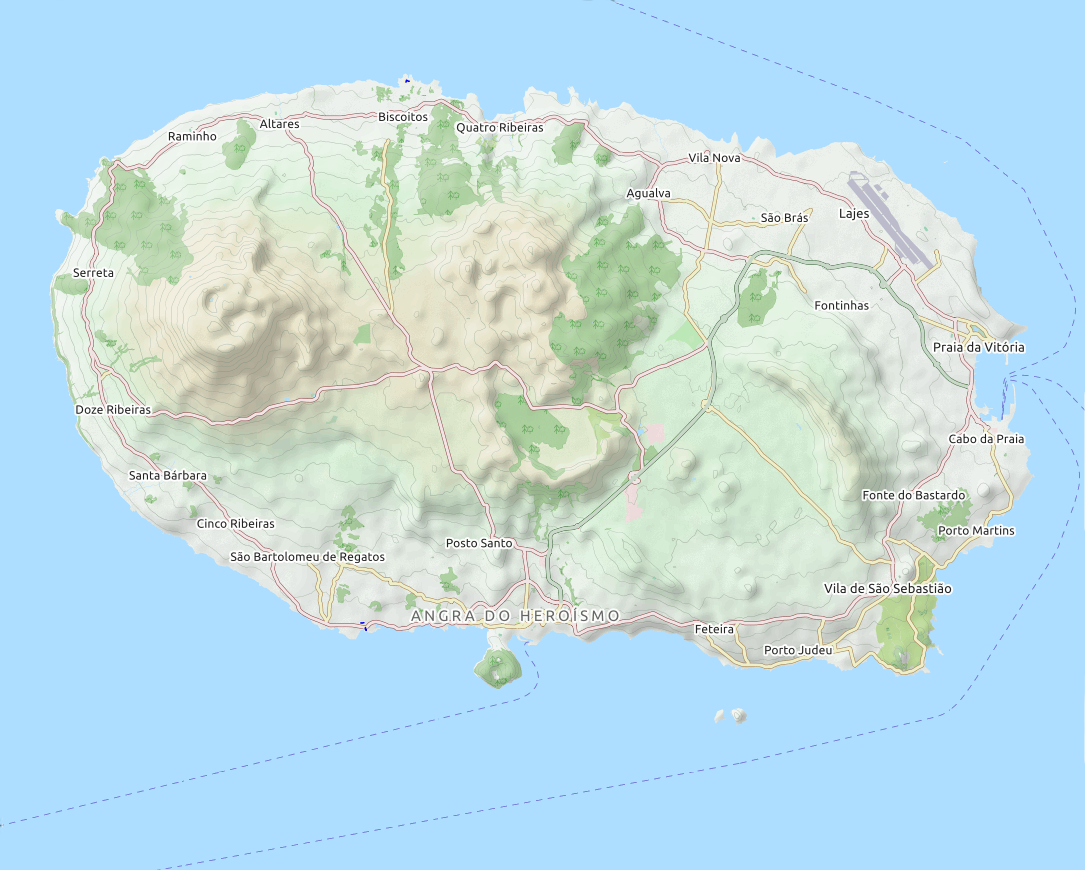
- Location within Terceira

General information
- Type: City Hall
- Architectural style: Medieval
- Location: Sé, Angra do Heroísmo, Portugal
- Coordinates: 38°39′21.6″N 27°13′5.6″W
- Opened: 1474
- Owner: Portuguese Republic

Technical details
- Material: Masonry stone

Website
- www.cm-ah.pt

UNESCO World Heritage Site
- Official name: Central Zone of the Town of Angra do Heroismo in the Azores
- Criteria: iv, vi
- Reference: 206
- Inscription: 1983 (7th Session)

The Angra do Heroísmo City Hall (Portuguese: Paços do Concelho de Angra do Heroísmo) is a medieval structure constructed to house the municipal council/authority, situated in the civil parish of Sé, municipality of Angra do Heroísmo, on the Portuguese archipelago of the Azores.

== History ==
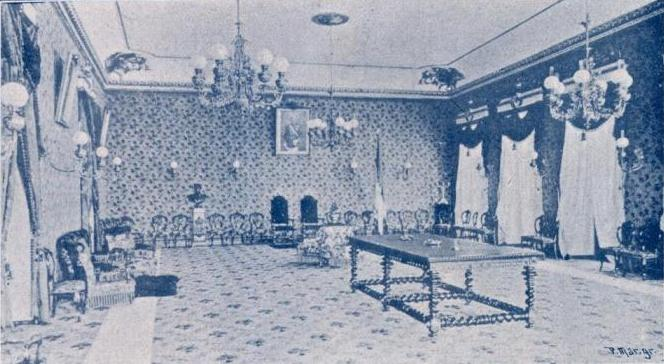
A view of the noble hall in 1903 before remodelling associated with the visit of the former Royal Family

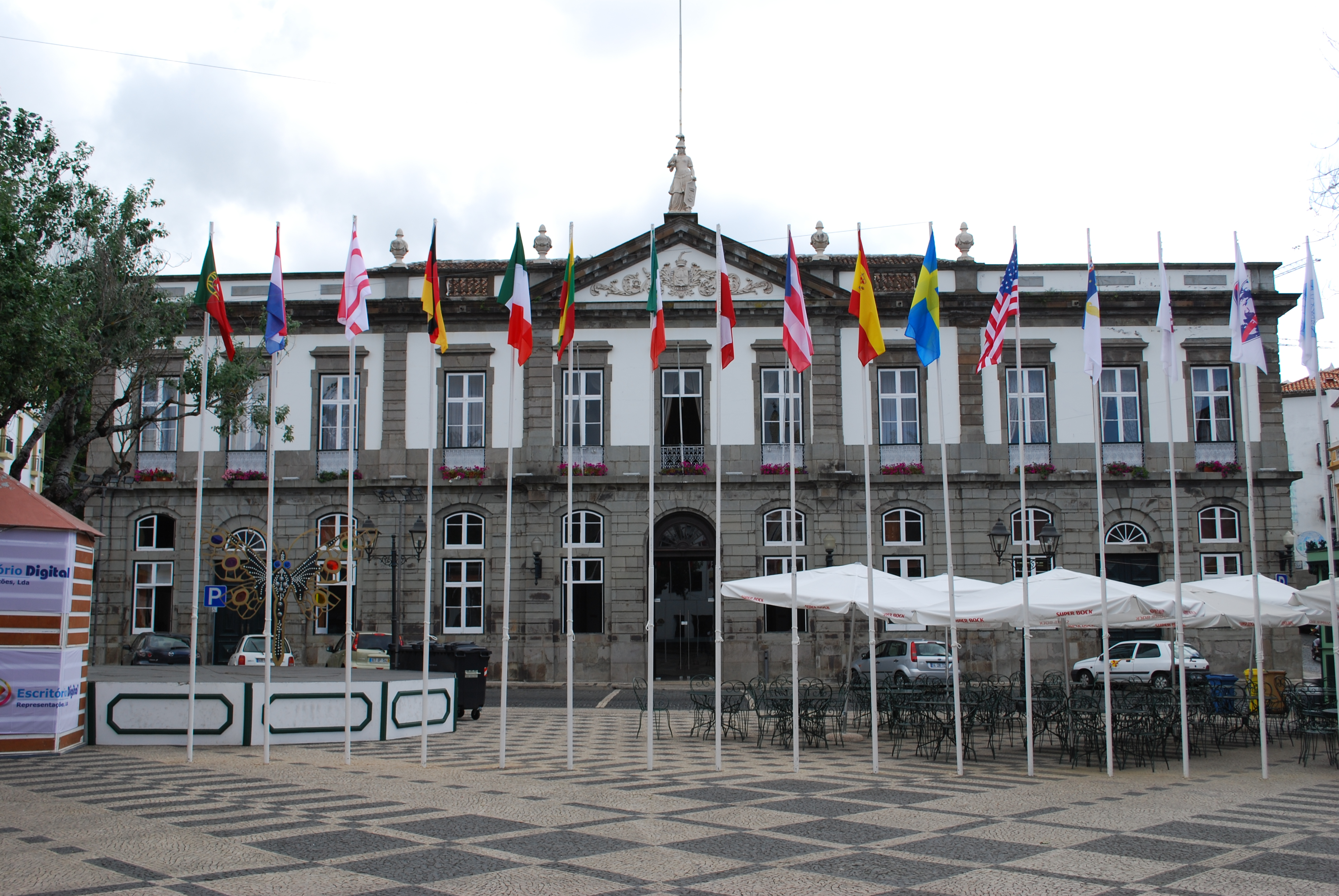
The municipal building seen from the municipal square

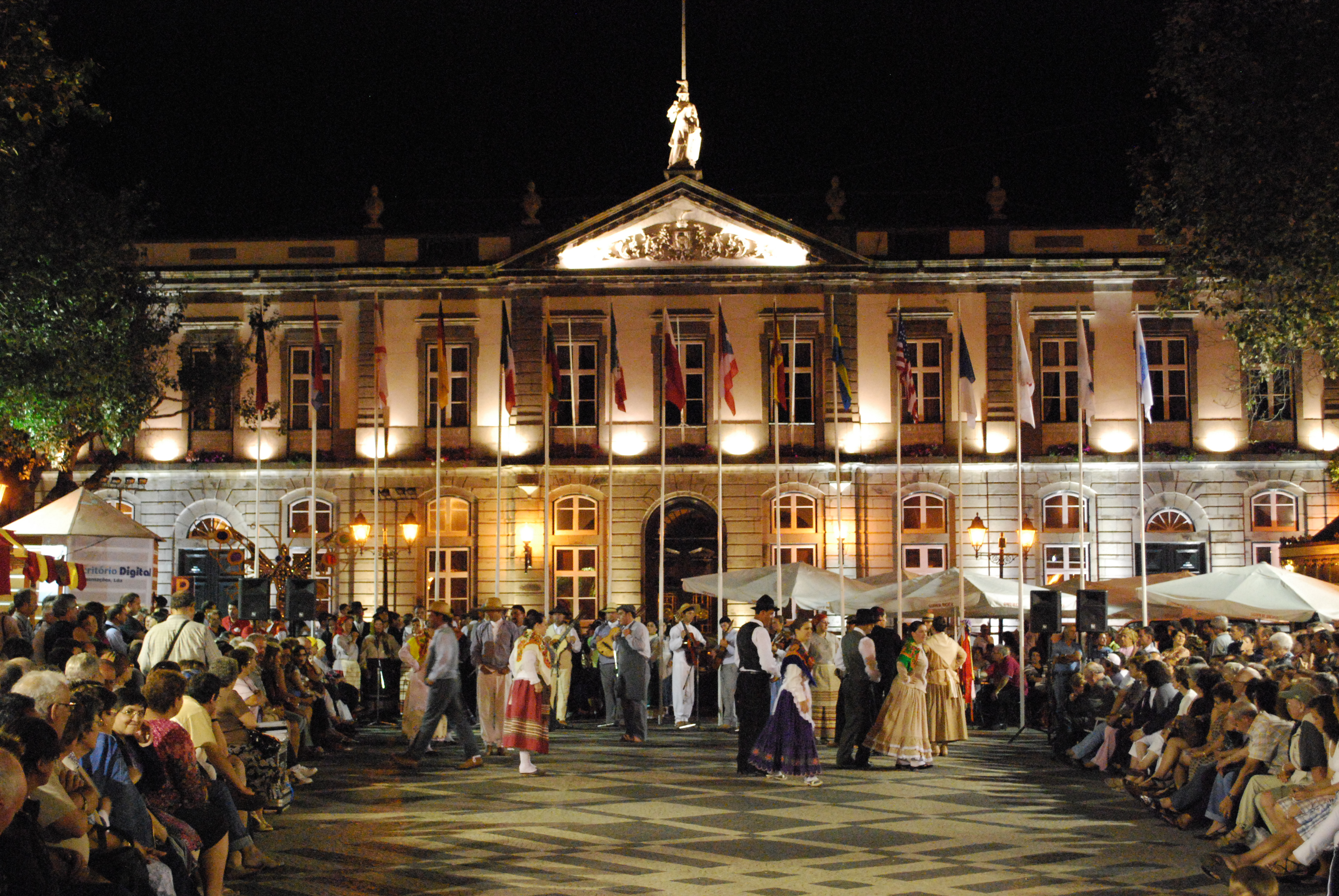
A nocturnal presentation of folklore dancing in the square, with the palace in the background

The first organized municipal meeting occurred in 1474; called by João Vaz Corte Real, the first Senate of Angra occurred on the site of the current building. In 1534, the town was elevated to the status of city. The first representation of the municipal seat appeared in 1589, showing a small square, in a letter by Jan Huygen van Linschoten. At that time, a small bystreet existed behind the building, connecting the Rua do Galo to the Ladeira de São Francisco.

In 1608, an earthquake caused damage many of the buildings in the city. Between 1610-1611, the building was remodelled, resulting in the refurbishment of the building and expand the municipal square. Drawings of the building at that time showed a two-storey building with its front facade including three divisions, with its lateral wings with single windows over sill on the ground floor and two windows with cornices on the second floor. The central section included an arcade with five rounded arches surmounted by varanda supporting an architrave, and accessible by lateral staircases. At the top of the central wing was a two-storey rectangular belltower, crowned by pinnacles. In addition to its administrative municipal function, the building sheltered simultaneously the jail and courts services.

On 1 April 1643, by royal decree (issued by King D. John IV) Angra received the title of Sempre Leal Cidade (Always Loyal City) due to its notable actions.

On 15 March 1830, by decree, Angra was named capital of Portugal, under the Regency of Angra when liberals supported the reign of Queen D. Maria II. At that time, Miguel owing to the events leading to the Liberal Wars was King of Portugal, usurping his niece. Liberal forces of the Azores supported the young Queen and Regency of Angra was established as her government-in-exile. This progressive administration lead to the 1831 administrative reforms that allowed for the first elected municipal council. Owing to their support, a regal letter dated 12 January 1837, the Crown conferred the title Mui nobre, leal e sempre constante cidade de Angra do Heroísmo (Very noble, loyal and always constant city of Angra do Heroísmo), along with receiving the title of Grand-Cross of the Tower and of the Sword. There was a decision to construct a new building in 1847, and a plan was ordered executed in the city of Porto, by António José Rodrigues Fartura, a rich merchant who established himself in Angra. The beginning of the project occurred on 15 June 1847. On 11 August 1849, the cornerstone for the modern municipal building, timed to coincide with the 20th anniversary of the Battle of Praia. A few years later (10 March 1865) the name of the square was changed to Praça da Restauração (Restoration Square). By 11 August 1866, the new building was formally inaugurated, having cost over 40 contos de reis.

The noble hall was redecorated in 1901, in order to receive the royal family (King D. Carlos and Queen Amélie of Orléans. Sometime the first quarter of the 20th century, the stained-glass near the staircase was fabricated in Lisbon glass and installed by Abraham Davis Abbot.

During the 1950s, the furniture in the assembly hall was redone in rosewood, by the school of the Fundação Ricardo Espírito Santo Silva. Also the draperies, valances and other elements of the main hall, were redone during the presidential visit Craveiro Lopes Marechal in 1957.

The bust of Infante D. Henrique by Numídio Bessone was inaugurated in 1960, during the celebrations marking the 500 century of his death.

On 1 January 1980 an extreme earthquake caused damage to the property, namely fractures and offsets along the walls of the elevation, supports to the covered structure along the open arches in the attic.

There were also many cracks along the parapets, displacement or overturning of decorative elements and problems with the supports along the outer walls, legs, corners and floor joists along the attic (especially along the southern wall). There were also appreciable deformations along the legs of pedestals of the main hall.

Following a period of construction, on 9 September 2004, by resolution of the Regional Government (126/2004) the building was included within the classified areas of the Zona Central da Cidade de Angra do Heroismo (Central Zone of the City of Angra do Heroísmo), published in the JORAA Journal of the Autonomous Regional Government of the Azores (Série 1, 15).

== Architecture ==
The municipal palace situated in the centre of the historic centre of Angra do Heroísmo, adapted to the slope at the end of a block and flanked by roadways. Its western facade is occupied by a large square, called Praça Velha, paved with Portuguese pavement stone, forming geometric shapes and punctuated by trees. Immediately around the square are the Chapel of Nossa Senhora da Saúde (to the north) and buildings of the Caixa Geral de Depósitos (in the west), while other buildings located near the seat are the Convent of São Francisco, the Chapel of Cruzeiro (in the northeast), the Church of Nossa Senhora da Conceição, the Palacete Silveira e Paulo (in the southeast), the Sé Cathedral of Angra do Heroísmo (in the southwest), the Colégio de Santo Inácio, alongside the Garden of the Duke of Terceira (to the northwest).

The municipal hall is a simple, rectangular plan covered in tiled ceiling. The two-floor facade is decorated in cornerstone with fenestrated sills on the first floor, and with the second floor encircled by stone terminating in plain cornices, decorated in white. The main facade is oriented to the west, and includes five sections, with rectangular frontispiece and jagged cornices, crowned by a marble feminine statute, representing the city of Angra. The tympanum of the frontispiece is decorated by the city coat-of-arms, that includes phytomorphic motifs in relief in stone. The ground floor includes three section, separated by pilasters that includes a central portico with arched doorway and lateral sections with corresponding square doors surmounted by semi-circular rounded windows. The remaining window units on the main floor are bi-sectional groups of rectangular windows, surmounted by smaller arched windows, framed in stone. The second floor includes tall window-doors, with wrought-iron varandas, surmounted by cornices and sills.

The principal entranceway fronts on a large vestibule, with frontal gallery that includes an arcade of three rounded-arches, over central pilasters, covered by false cruciform vaulted-ceilings in stucco. From the central arch is the staircase that leads to the subsequent floors, with landing and then parallel flights to the second floor. On the intermediary landing, is the bust of Infante D. Henrique, flanked by three large, rectangular stained-glass windows with representations of the heraldry of the city of Angra, and in the centre the national heraldry.

On the second floor, as halls decorated in textiles with phytomorphic motifs. The vestibule, with columns on either side, is dominated by an Arraiolos carpet, a buffet table in woods dated to the 18th century, with silver candelabra, flanked by chairs from the old session hall. The sessional or "noble" hall, with rosewood furniture and three carved coat-of-arms, used over the centuries, and great hall with enamel ceiling with the municipal insignia.

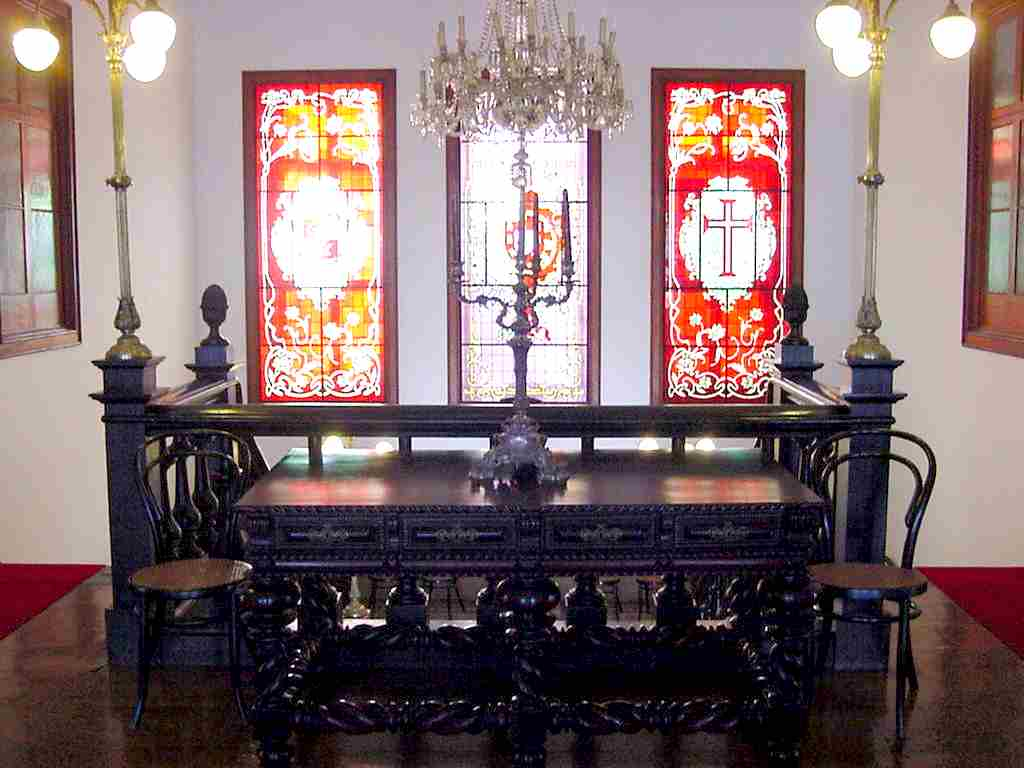
Furniture on the second floor landing, showing the stained-glass windows above the staircase

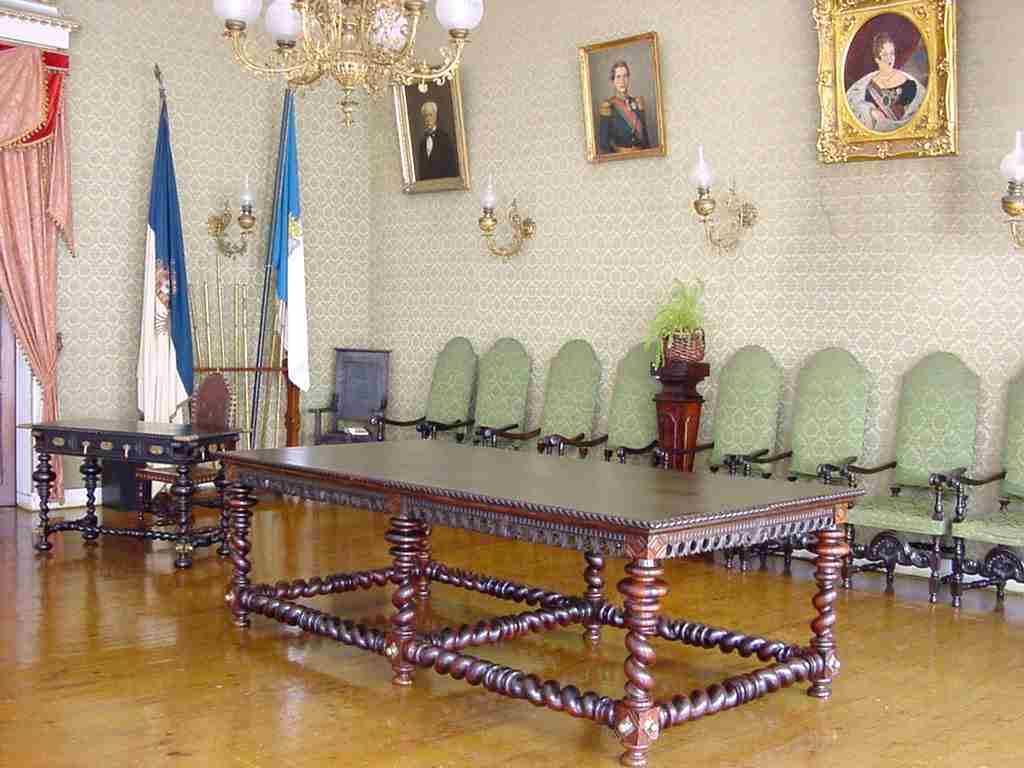
Main table in the noble hall, with paintings of the members of the Regency of Angra

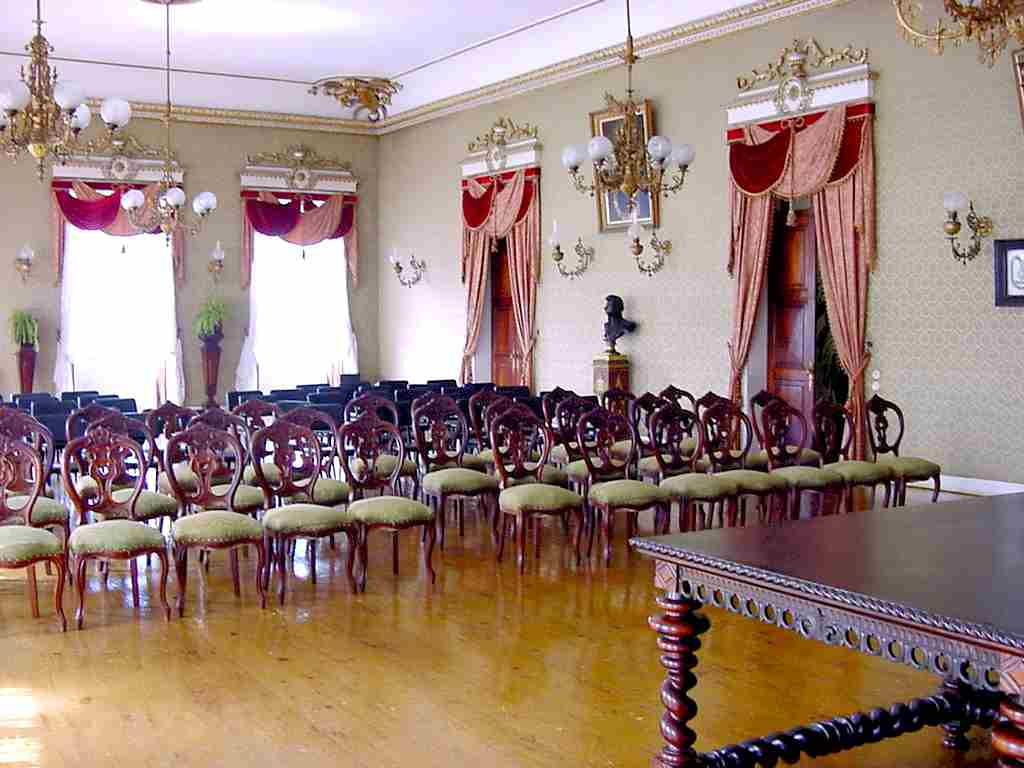
The noble hall arranged for a presentation in 2012
