= Castle of Moinhos =

Ruined fort in the Azores

- Castelo dos Moinhos
- Terceira, Central, Azores in Portugal
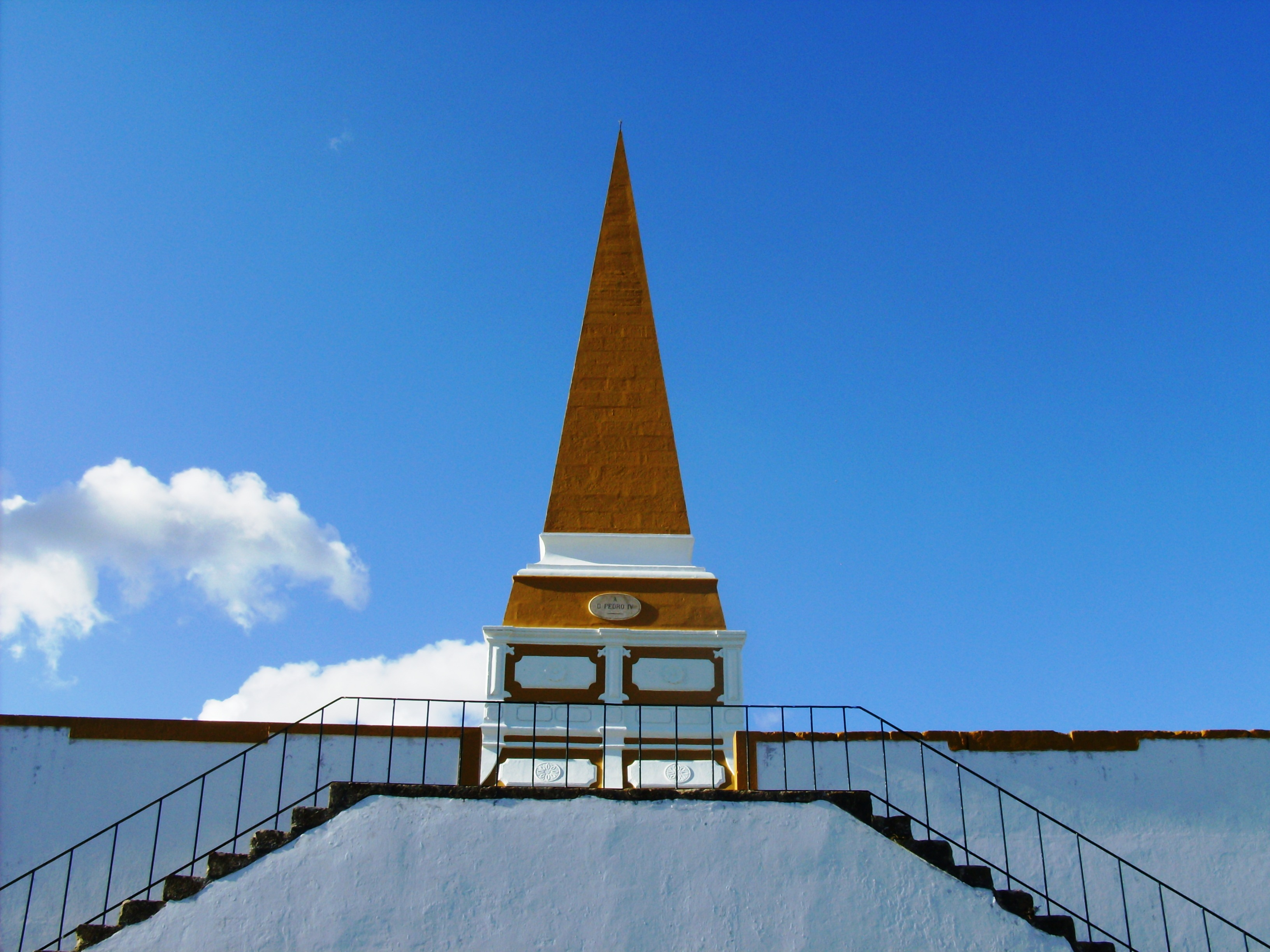
- The pinnacle of the Alto da Memoria situated on the hilltop battlements of what was once the Fort of São Cristóvão

Site information
- Type: Castle
- Owner: Portuguese Republic
- Operator: Secretaria Regional da Cultura
- Open to the public: Public

Location
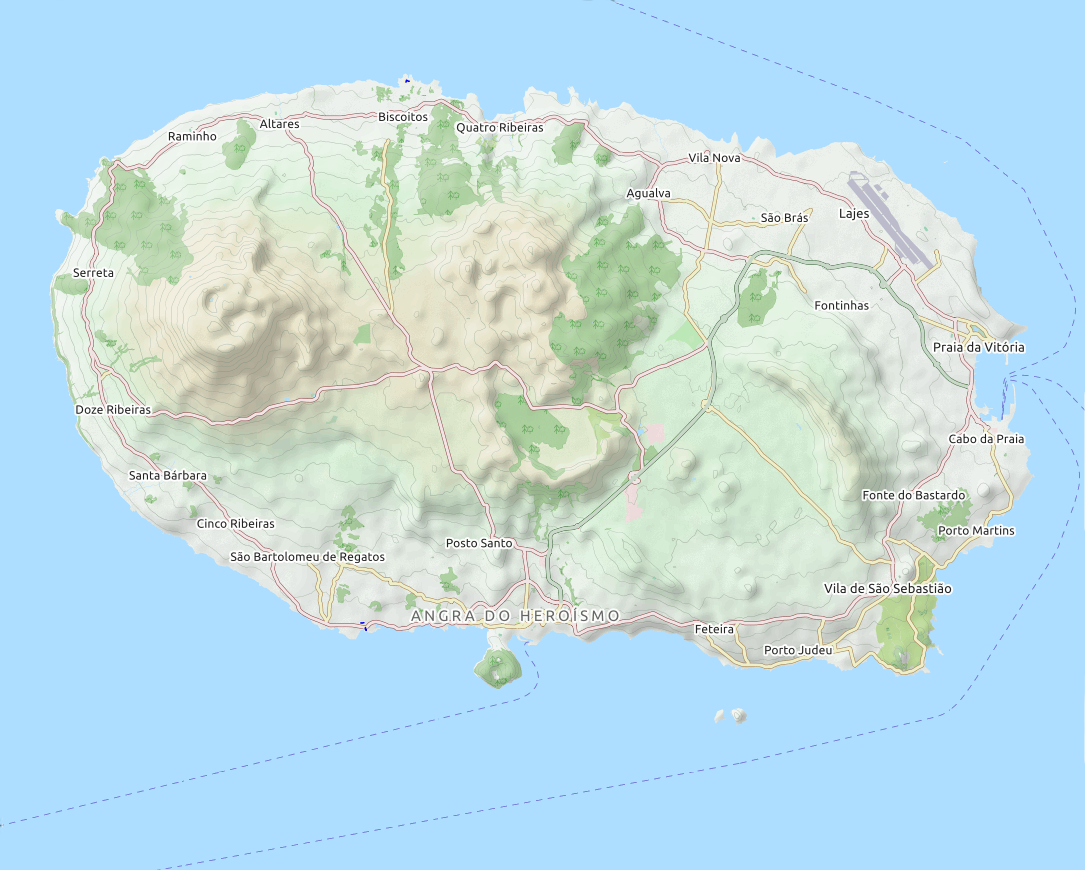
- Location of the Castle/Fort ruins within the municipality of Angra do Heroísmo
- Coordinates: 38°39′33.23″N 27°13′10.38″W

Site history
- Built: 1461
- Materials: Basalt, Tile

The Castle of Moinhos, officially known as the Castle of São Cristóvão, or Castle/Fort of São Luís is the name of the ruins of 16th-century fortification in city of Angra, on the Portuguese island of Terceira in the archipelago of the Azores. It is primarily known as the Castle of Moinhos, owing to the popular name given to the site for the number of mills that dotted the hilltop, on which the castle was erected.

== History ==
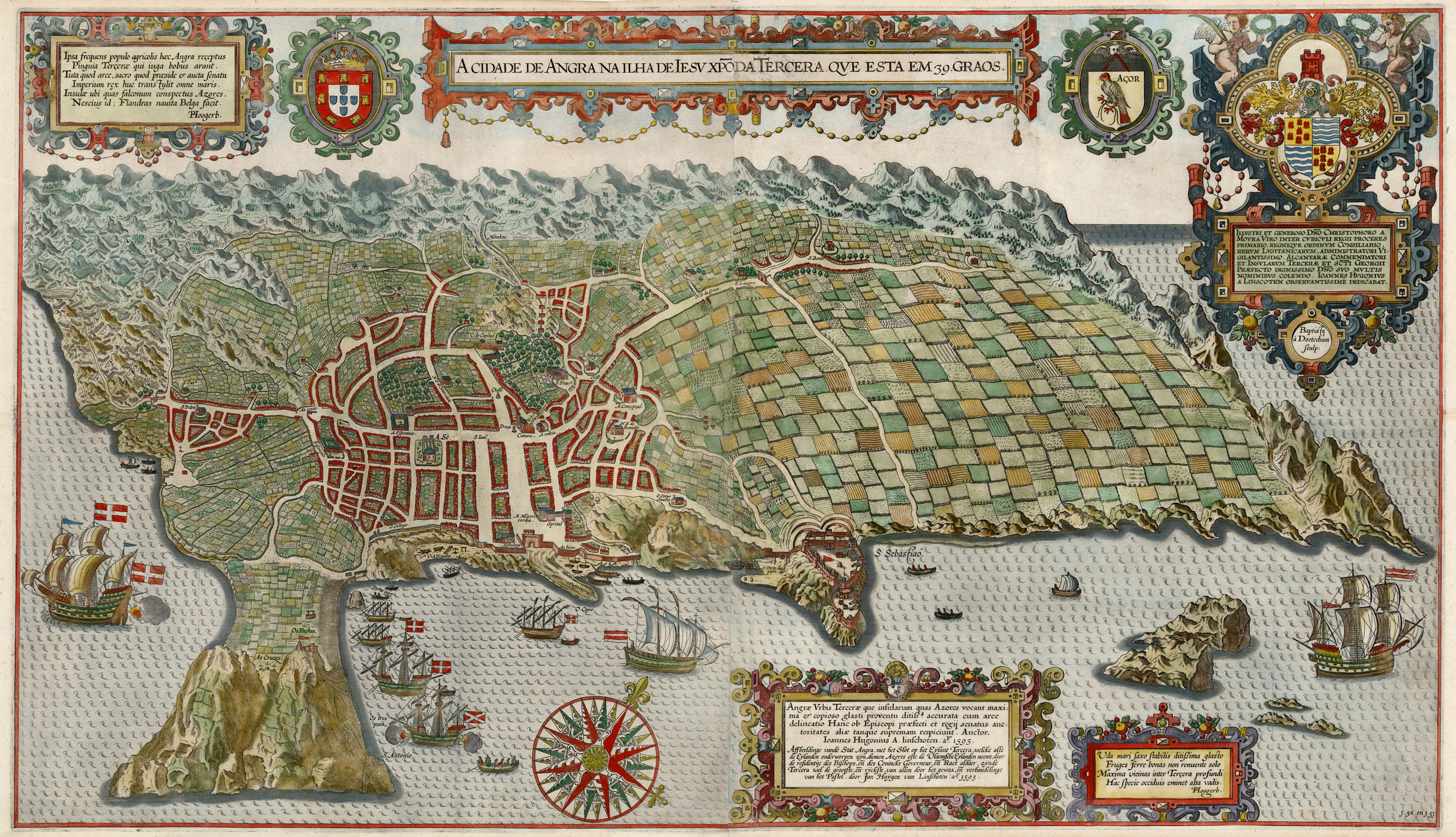
A Cidade de Angra na Ilha de Jesus... (Linschoten, 1595), a period map of Angra

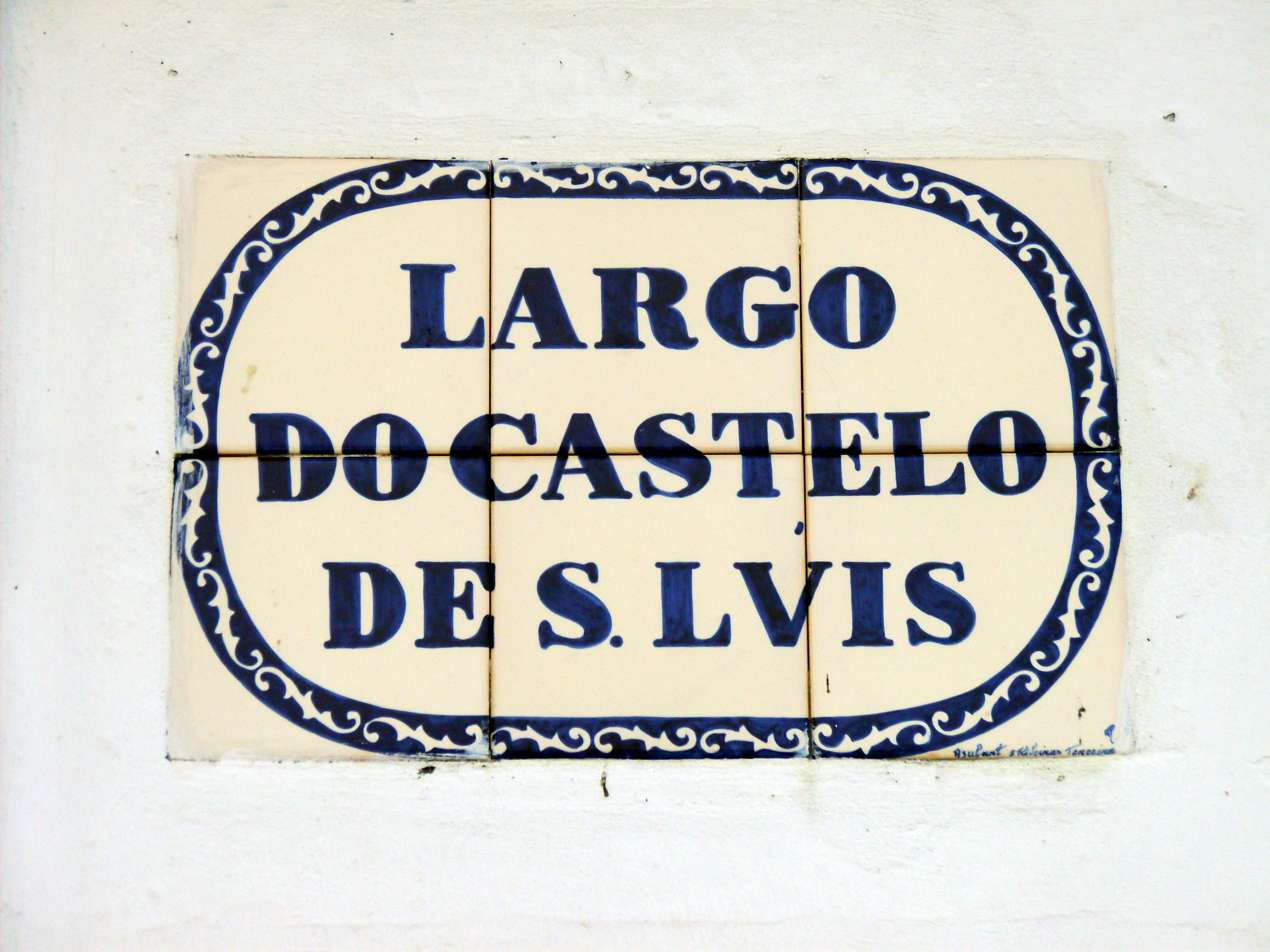
A commemorative azulejo tile on the hilltop, marking the existence of the old Fort of São Luís

The first fort to be built in the archipelago, the Castle of São Luís was erected between the 1460 and 1470, by the founder of Angra, Álvaro Martins Homem. It was a fortification of modest proportions, established on a hilltop (the current Alto da Memória) with a dominant position over the valley, river and harbour. Its design was in keeping with the late-medieval military design and constructed on a high platform, within the earth and away from the sea. Its elevation and slope resulted in an artificial ravine, whose waters were captured by Álvaro Martins (1461) to move his milling wheels along its course; the fortification became popularly known as the Castle of Moinhos or Castle of Mills. Writing in between 1644 and 1711, Father Manuel Luís Maldonado wrote of the many waterways of Angra, noted several of the mills that dotted the path of the main ravine: the mills of Janela, Cova, Picão, Rego, Madeira, Calçada, Calçadinha, Fábrica, Muro, Duas Portas, São João de Deus and the Moinho Novo. Similarly, Gaspar Frutuoso mentioned these mills and waterways, noting that: in the hillock that circles Angra, in one of the higher hilltops to the north, is a castle fort with munitions and artillery, newly renovated and provisioned, which had earlier been weak, erected solely for the shelter and defense of its residents.

Although Álvaro Martins expected to receive the royal donation of lands in Angra in 1474, the King substituted he donation with the title of to the Captaincy of Praia. The first Captain-major of the Captaincy of Angra, João Vaz Corte-Real found no reason to continue the defensive fortification. Unfortunately, years later, the island was attacked by Castilian sailors that initially landed in Angra and then marched on Praia. For this reason, in 1482, the Infanta Beatrice, who governed the islands on behalf of her son (the Captain-Major D. Diogo), sent a letter to Álvaro Martins, warning him that Castilian vessels continued to haunt the seas of the Azores. In order to reinforce coastal defenses, she sent Pedro Anes Rebelo (as provider of fortifications), to guide Martins in the defense of his village. After completing his task of building the Castle of São Luís (around 1493), Anes Rebelo wed a niece of João Vaz Corte-Real's spouse.

In 1495, the Alcaidaria-mor (similar to the Spanish alcalde) of the castle was given to the Captain-major of Angra, who lived there for a while. Later, it would become the residence of his trusted lieutenant, who was paid a stipend and obliged to take-up residence. Eventually the castle's Alcaidaria-mor was integrated into Captaincy of Angra, when it began to be known as the Castle of São Cristóvão (1582). It was during the reigns of King John III (1521–1557) and King Sebastian (1568–1578) that the first defensive plans were drawn-up by military engineer Tommaso Benedetto (in 1567). The Italian architect engineer concentrated on a global defense plan for the main islands of the Azores, concentrating the defenses at the ports and anchorages. Consequently, the old castle/fort served little use, and his successor, Ciprião de Figueiredo e Vasconcelos, doubled his efforts with fifty defensive works along the coast of the island. Its strategic role further degenerated, with many of its dependencies used to store gunpowder for Angra, transferred from the Praça Velha for security reasons. Father António Cordeiro (1641-1722), wrote of the castle's ruins in his História Insulana, identifying that only the walls remained of the structure, which was also identified by Father Maldonando. The small medieval fort, therefore, was slowly substituted by the coastal defenses of the Fort of São Sebastião and Fort of Santo António, with the latter strategically located at the edge of Monte Brasil (and which created a crossfire zone with the first, to secure the bay).

In 1839, the lands were donated to the City of Angra in order to building a municipal promenade.

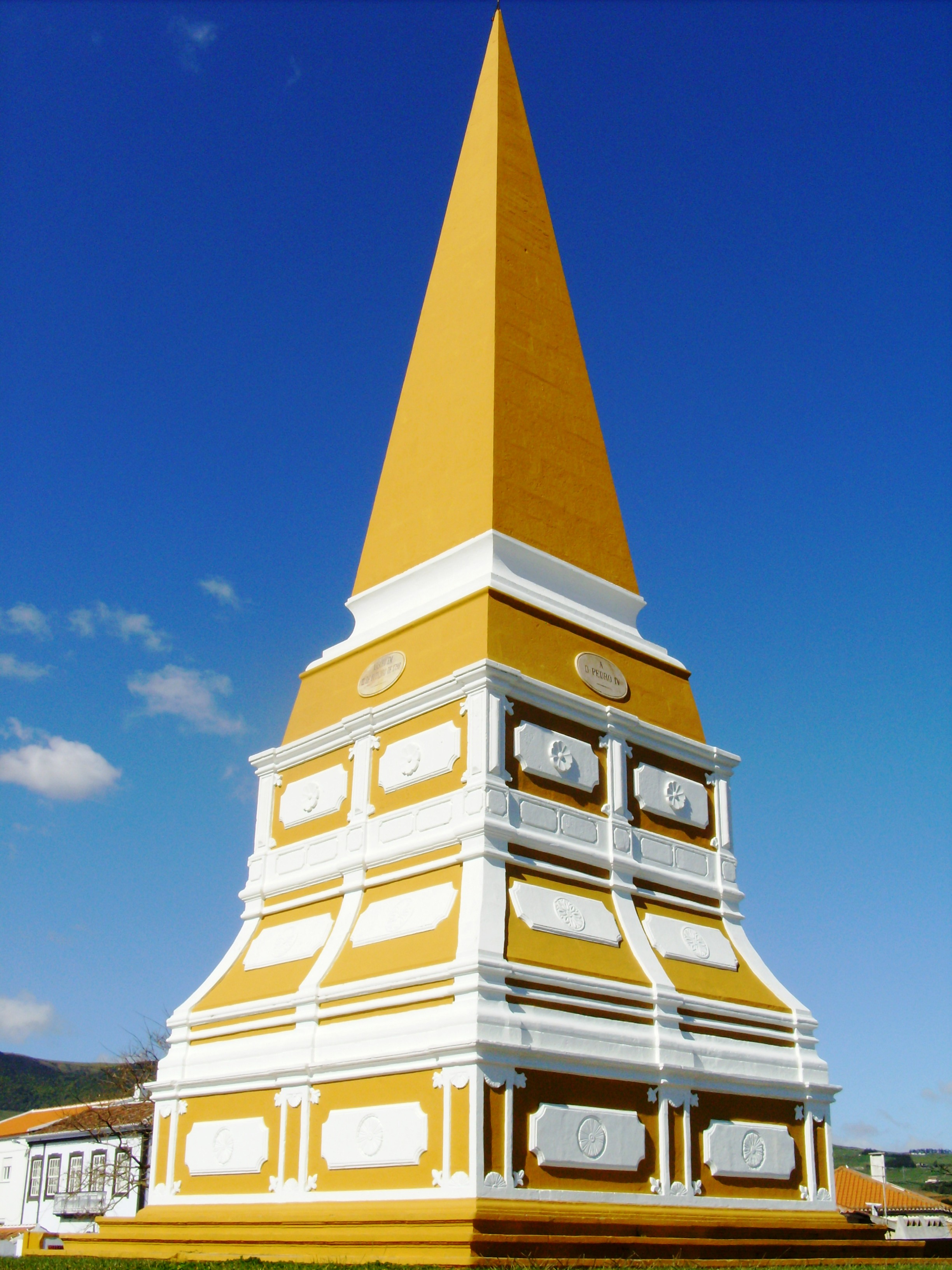
The obelisk dedicated to the memory of Pedro IV of Portugal

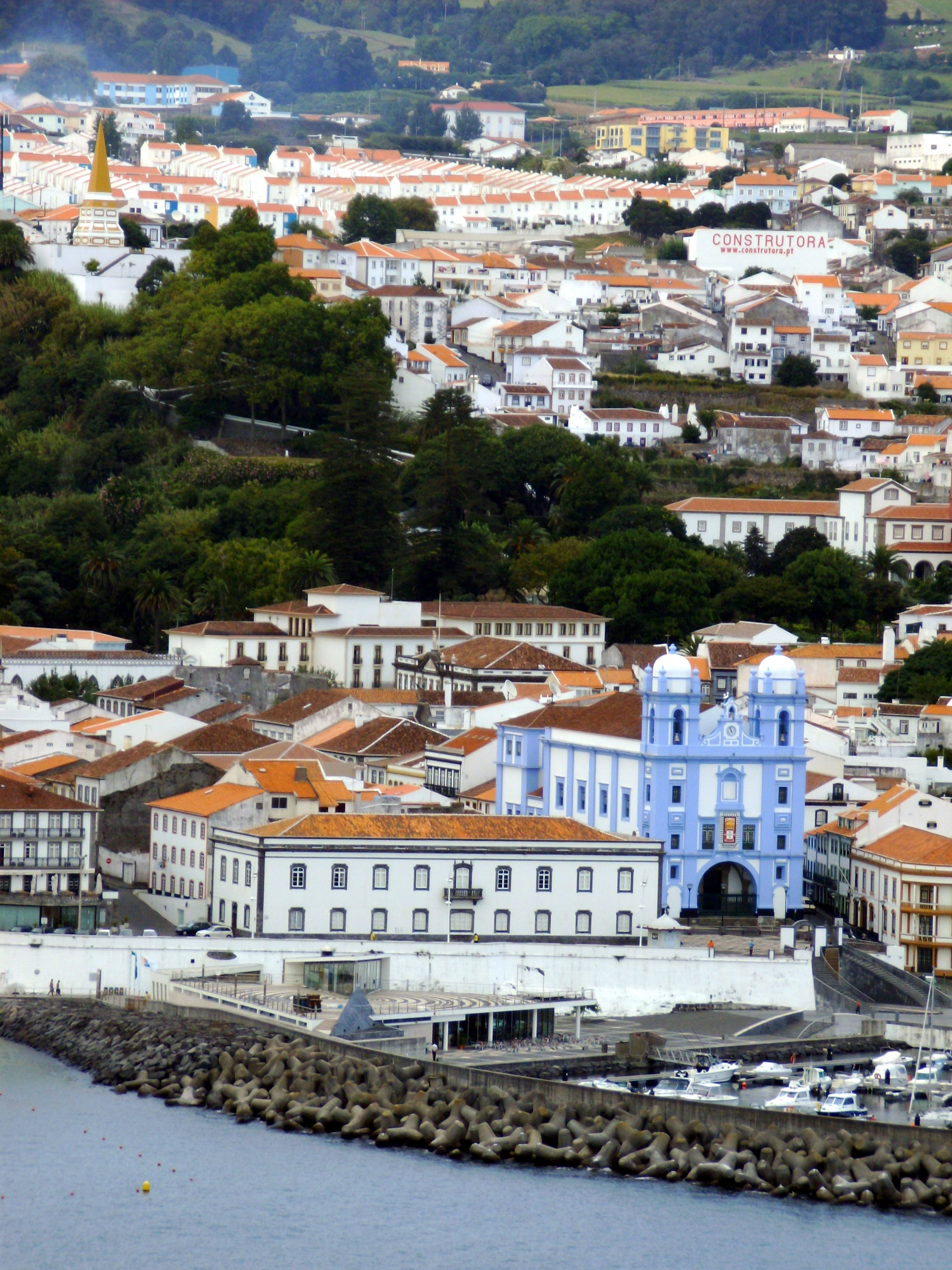
The historic centre and the hilltop of the Castle of Moinhos, shrouded in forest, and topped by the monumento Alto da Memória (on the left)

On 20 May 1844, work began to demolish the old walls, to construct a memorial in honour former-King Pedro IV of Portugal who was instrumental in the restoration of the Liberal regime of his daughter Queen Maria II, and whose regency was based in Terceira. The foundation-stone, which was believed to be the same rock that the former-monarch stepped-upon when he disembarked in Angra in 1832, was placed on the site on 3 March 1845. At the time of its inauguration (in 1856), the municipal council deliberated whether to name the newly built courtyard the Praça D. Pedro IV, but popular sentiment opted for the name Alto da Memória (Heights of Memory). The monument was practically destroyed during the 1980 earthquake, and was reconstructed/re-inaugurated by the municipal council on 25 April 1985.

== Architecture ==
The Castle of Moinhos is situated on the hilltop plateau that separates the eastern portion of the civil parish of Sé from Nossa Senhora da Conceição. The Alto da Memória monument and former castle grounds can be reached from the Gardens of the Duke of Terceira (its primary entrance at Rua do Marques) or directly from Rua do Pisão, where the monument fronts the roadway.

Little remains of the castle features except the waist-high battlements, that served little more than lookout to the city of Angra. A double staircase connects the main platform from the path leading to the Gardens. Gardened and manicured, the spaces below the old castle are lined by endemic and flowering plants. Apart from the monument to D. Pedro IV, the only remnant to the fortifications use is an azulejo tile dedicated to the Fort of São Luís located in the staircase. Remnants of the ravine canalization and mills are evident in the roads that lead from the park grounds, including along the Rua do Pisão, Rua do Garoupinha and Rua de Santo Espírito.
