= Palacete Silveira e Paulo =

Palacete of Silveira e Paulo
- Palaceto Silveira e Paulo
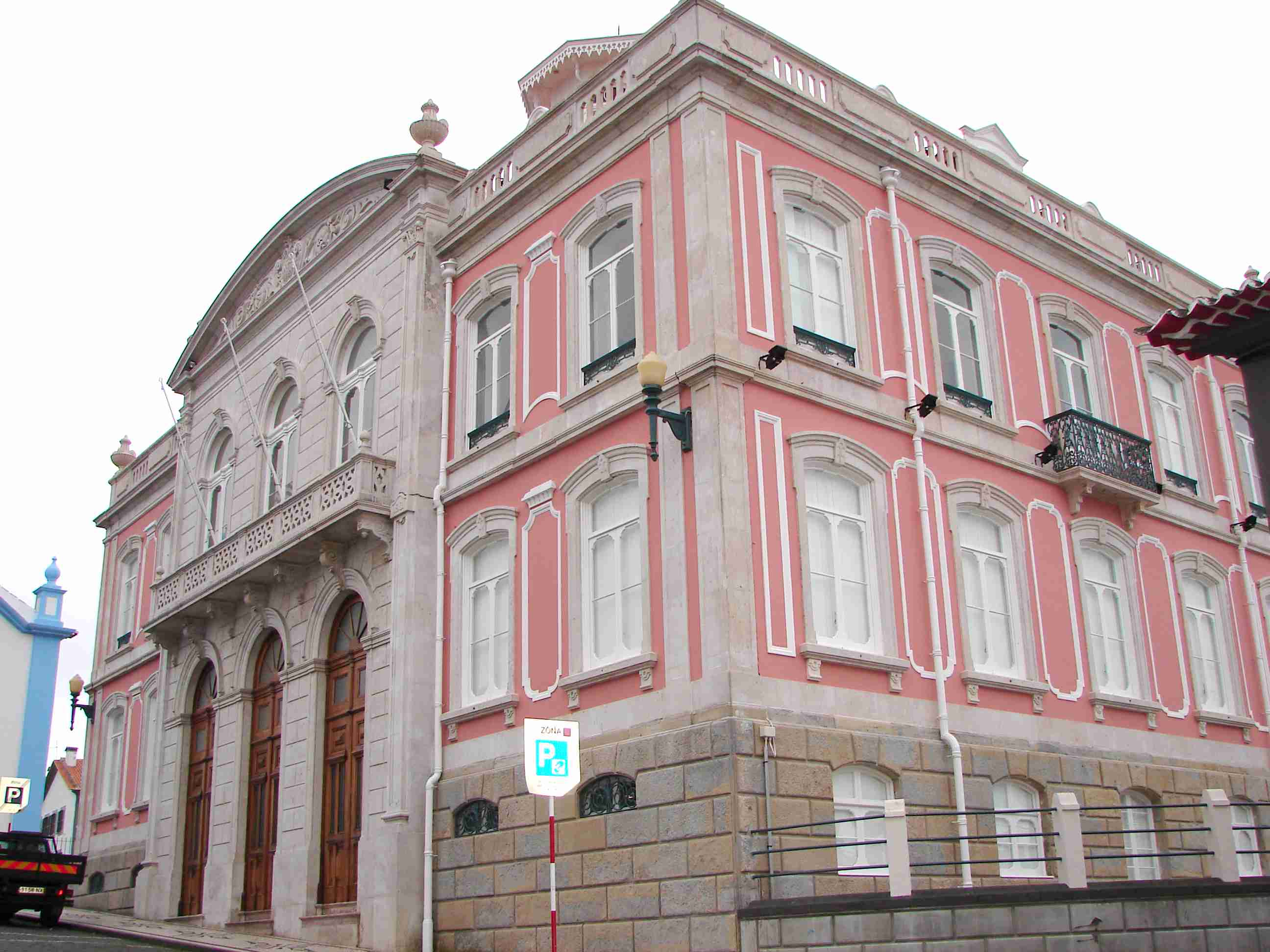
- The view of the front facade of the Palacete Silveira e Paulo
- Interactive map of the Palacete of Silveira e Paulo area

General information
- Type: Palacette
- Architectural style: Medieval
- Location: Nossa Senhora da Conceição, Portugal
- Coordinates: 38°39′20.3″N 27°12′56″W
- Opened: 19th century
- Owner: Portuguese Republic

Technical details
- Material: Masonry

Design and construction
- Architect: João da Ponte

The Residence Silveira e Paulo (Portuguese: Palaceto Silveira e Paulo) is located on Rua da Conceição, in the civil parish of Nossa Senhora da Conceição, in the historic centre of Angra do Heroísmo, Terceira Island, in the Portuguese archipelago of the Azores. Completed in the style of the late 19th century, the residence is one of the more notable examples of Azorean civil construction in the transition between 19th and 20th centuries.

== History ==
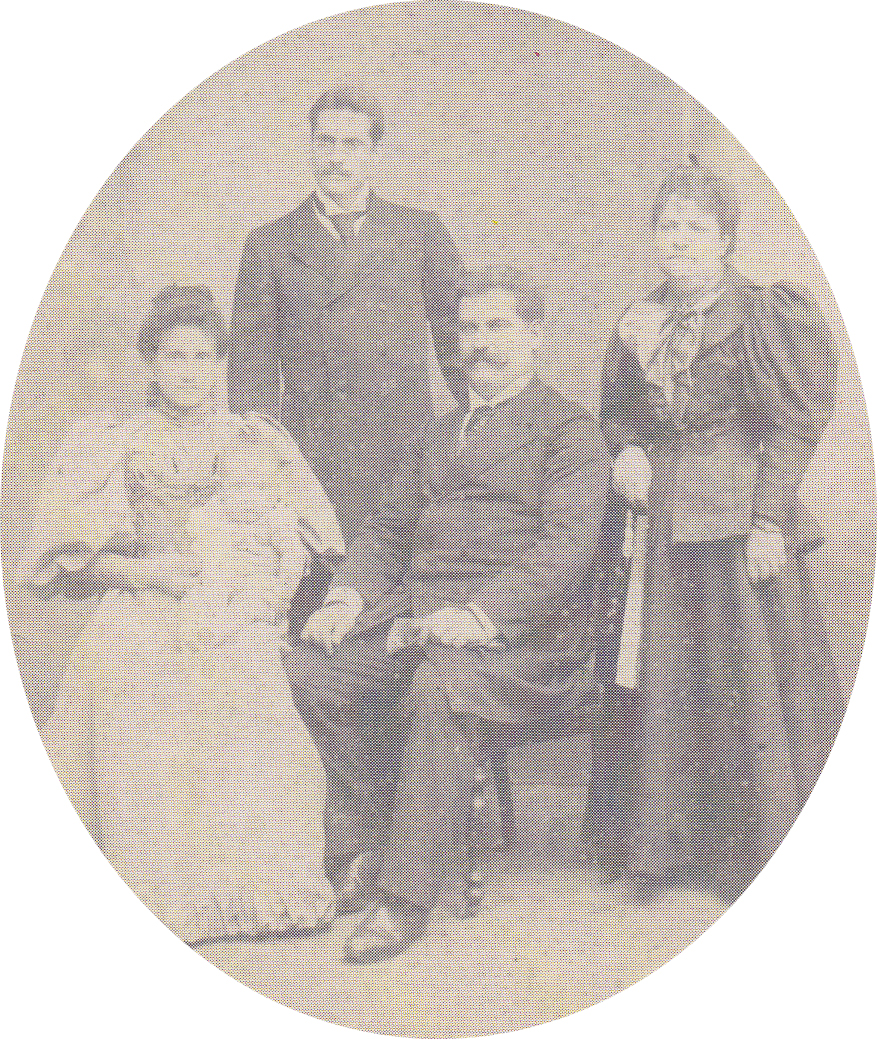
A historic photograph of members of the Silveira e Paulo family

In the 19th century, Domingos Machado da Silveira e Paulo, from a modest family of quarrymen and agricultural farmers raised in Santo Amaro on the island of Pico, departed for São Tomé, where he worked in the roça Colónia Açoriana. Domingos took his extended family, that included four siblings, who formed an important society, involved in the international cocoa market. In 1881, his brother, João Jorge da Silveira Paulo, commander, wealthy property-owner and capitalist, went to study in Angra. A year later, João Jorge returned to São Tomé where, under the direction and influence of his prestigious/respected brother, amassed a great fortune. At the end of the 19th century, the commander and Knight of the Royal House, João Jorge da Silveira Paulo, returned to Angra do Heroísmo, and bought two estates from the Noronha family, erected near the Church of Conceição.

The Palacete Silveira e Paulo was constructed under his initiative following his purchase of the last residence of Manuel Homem de Noronha, which was situated in the same location. He ordered the demolition of this estate-house and began to construct his palacette, under the direction of the Micaelense master-builder João da Ponte. The left pilaster, inscribed with "1899", may indicate the possible initiation of its construction, while the right pilaster is inscribed with "1901", indicating its date of completion.

In 1937, the palacete was acquired by the State for a mere 84 contos, to install the Escola Comercial e Industrial da Ilha Terceira, which began operating as of 1939.

This school was extinguished in 1978, and its students integrated into the Liceu Nacional de Angra do Heroísmo (National Lyceum of Angra do Heroísm). The property began operating as a preparatory school, an annex of the then-formed Escola Secundária Jerónimo Emiliano de Andrade (Jerónimo Emiliano de Andrade Secondary School).

On 1 January 1980, an earthquake provoked no destruction or damage, and the building began serving as the Conservatório Regional de Angra do Heroísmo.

By 1999, the palacete was in an advance stage of degradation, and was closed and transferred into the hands of the Direcção Regional da Cultura do Governo dos Açores (Regional Directorate of Culture). A public tender was issued in October 2000, to award a contract to restore and adapt the building for new activities: the building became the seat of the Directorate and Centro do Conhecimento dos Açores.

The property began a general decline by this point, eventually closing in 1999, and transferred to the Azorean Regional Directorate for Culture, who proceed to restore and adapt the building between 2000 and 2004, respecting the traditional architectural style. The demolition and construction included the installation of elevators and wash-rooms in cement, restoration of the stucco-works, frames, doors and windows, the installation of new water-pipes, electrical lines, telecommunication equipment and security features. Following 2003, the building became the headquarters for the Cultural Secretariat and the Azorean Knowledge Centre (Portuguese: Centro do Conhecimento dos Açores). In 2008, the educational spaces were closed, with the construction of the new public library. It was classified as a Property of Public Interest by resolution 64/84, on 30 April 1984, but was already included within the historical centre of Angra (resolution 41/80, 11 June 1980).

== Architecture ==
The former residence is implanted on the corner of an intersection between Rua do Morrão and Rua da Conceição, adapted to the slope of the roadways, and situated across from the parochial Church of Nossa Senhora da Conceição, the Solar and Chapel of Nossa Senhora dos Remédios and other historic homes/buildings of architectural significance. The Palacete Silveira e Paulo is two-floor rectangular building, with its ground floor partially located below ground and two above-ground floors that extend into the attic, surmounted by a small octangular lookout tower at its geometric centre. This structure corresponds to a building of six floors, with five above ground and one below, making it one of the tallest buildings in the city, only rivalled by the bell-towers of the Church of Conceição.

The building is constructed with double layer of masonry stone, with floors supported by resinous pine beams, braced with four metal rods and lateral crossbeams, giving the property a great resistance to earthquakes. This was reinforced by the events of 1 January 1980, when the Azores earthquake caused the destruction of neighbouring properties, while the Palacete remained unscathed. The exterior facade, facing the main street that include principal doorway and windows are framed by imported stone: red marble, from the Alentejo and blue stone from Cascais, contributing to the monuments historic importance.

The main facade, fronting the Rua da Conceição includes a high portico entranceway of worked wood and central veranda, corresponding to the noble hall of the residence. From this entranceway, the main hall fronts a staircase, whose second floor fronts a stained glass window representing two mythological figures, representing agriculture and commerce (owing to the former-owners association with either). The interior rooms was liberally decorated with the best materials available in the period. The floors and pavements were covered in wood, from various species, in complex and elaborate mosaics, and the rooms decorated in gold, silver and painted plaster. There is also polychromatic stucco-works, on the ceiling and in the halls on the two floors.

From the small tower there are views of the city of Angra, in all directions, across the polychromatic windows and the accessible octagonal veranda.
