= Duke of Terceira Garden =

Garden on the island of Terceira, Portugal

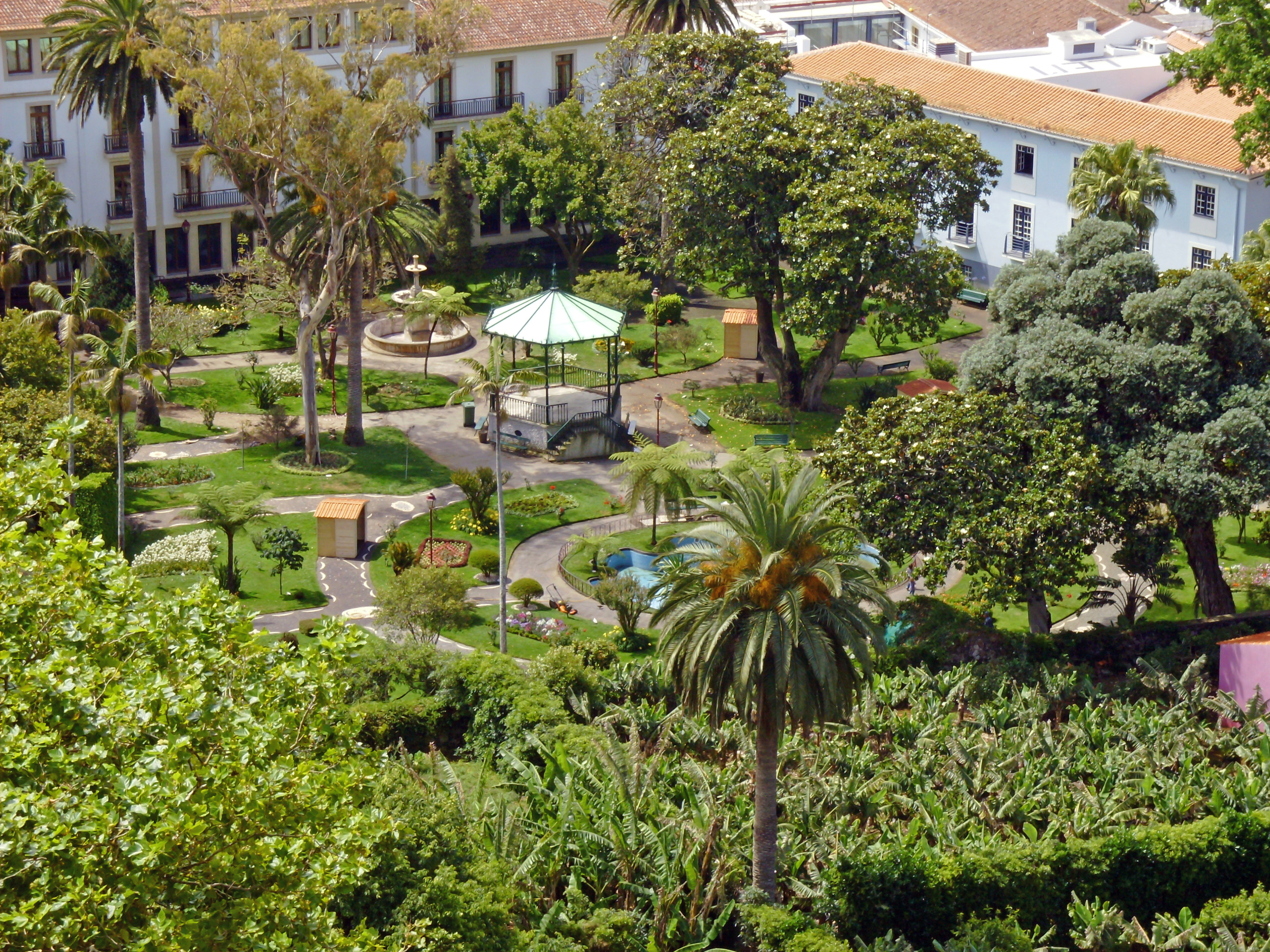
- The main square of the garden, with bandshelter and manicured grounds along the Rua da Direita
- Interactive map of Duke of Terceira Garden
- Location: Angra do Heroísmo, Terceira, Central, Azores, Portugal
- Coordinates: 38°39′24.07″N 27°13′7.04″W
- Length: .28 km (0.17 mi)
- Width: .20 km (0.12 mi)
- Area: 17.5 km^{2} (6.8 sq mi)
- Elevation: 29 m (95 ft)
- Operator: Câmara Municipal de Angra do Heroísmo

Duke of Terceira Garden (Portuguese: Jardim Duque da Terceira) is a manicured garden in the historical centre of Angra do Heroísmo, on the island of Terceira in the Portuguese archipelago of the Azores. One of the classic gardens emblematic of the Romantic period of Portuguese history, it is part of the municipal gardens of the city of Angra (located within the civil parish of Nossa Senhora da Conceição.

== History ==
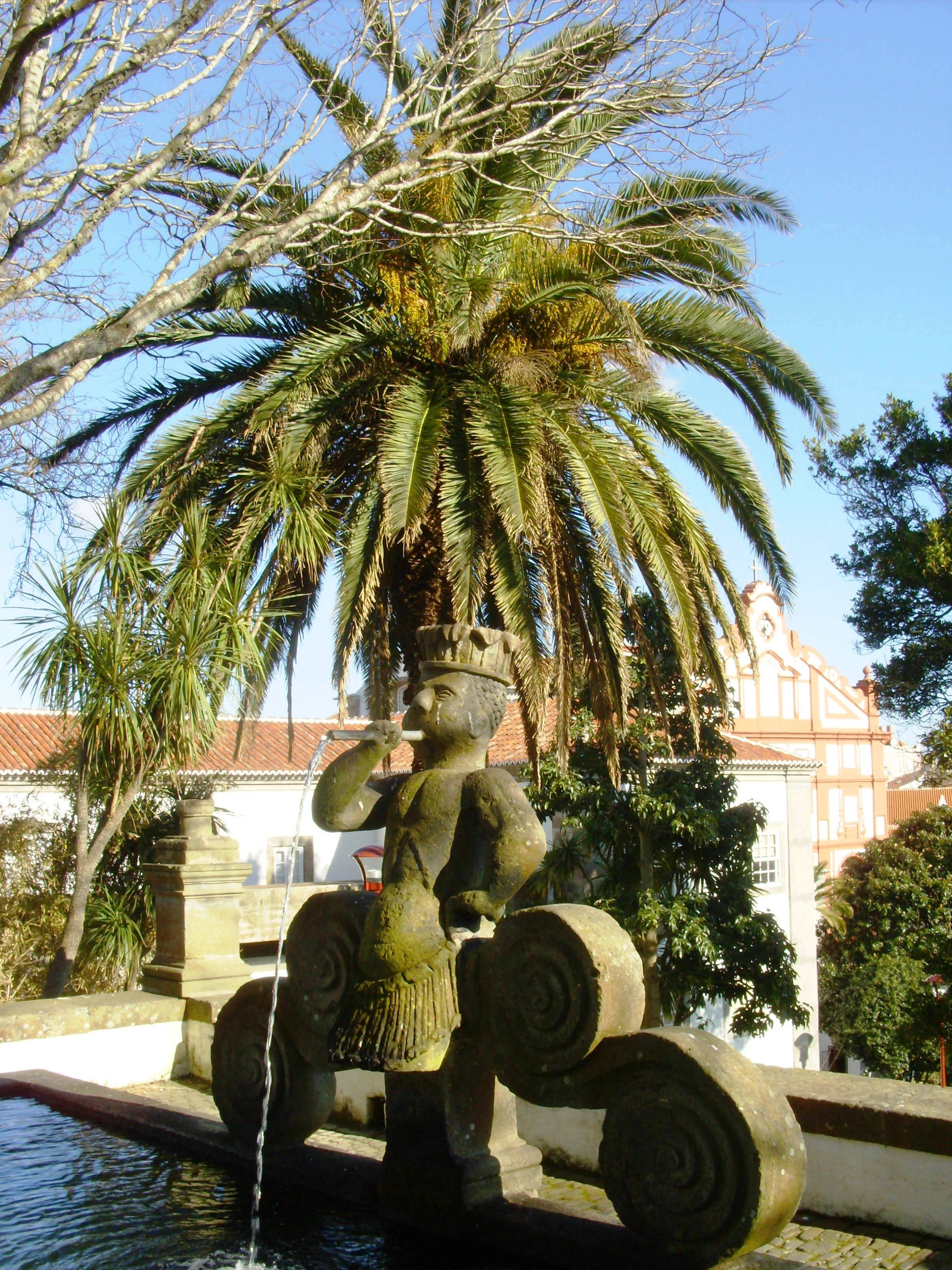
The Brazilian_Amerindian bust and water tank used, historically, to irrigate the garden

Urban growth in the 19th century, brought to Angra the notion of the public garden and green-spaces to the urban zones. What developed in the municipality was the concept of public footpaths or walkways, where events were usually organized. The municipal council of Angra, therefore, acquired in 1864 the useful area known as Sítio Fagundes, purchasing the 16.33 square kilometres (6.31 mi^{2}) building, registered in 1872 in the Conservatória do Registo Predial, to construct a public space.

The area was part of the old courtyards of the Jesuit College (the Jardim de Baixo) and the Convent of São Francisco (the Bosques and Jardim de Cima). Meanwhile, the district agricultural council transferred these terrains for rental purposes to the autarchy and there established an experimental plot, that divided the space of the Jardim de Baixo into five parcels for floriculture, fruticulture, horticulture, high culture and vineyard.

At the beginning of 1882, it was the district Civil Governor, Afonso de Castro, who remembered the original intentions to create a public space in the old Sítio Fagundes. Six months later the municipal hall already had people enlisted to develop the terrain for this purpose. To honour the contributions of the Duke of Terceira, António José Severim de Noronha, in the Liberal Wars, the garden was named for the civil war veteran. Final deliberations occurred on 18 January 1888, and the spaces were re-purposed to serve as the Passeio Duque da Terceira; Angra, therefore, obtained a corner and strategic green-space in the heart of the city, isolated from the chattering classes of the neighbouring Praça Velha.

== Geography ==
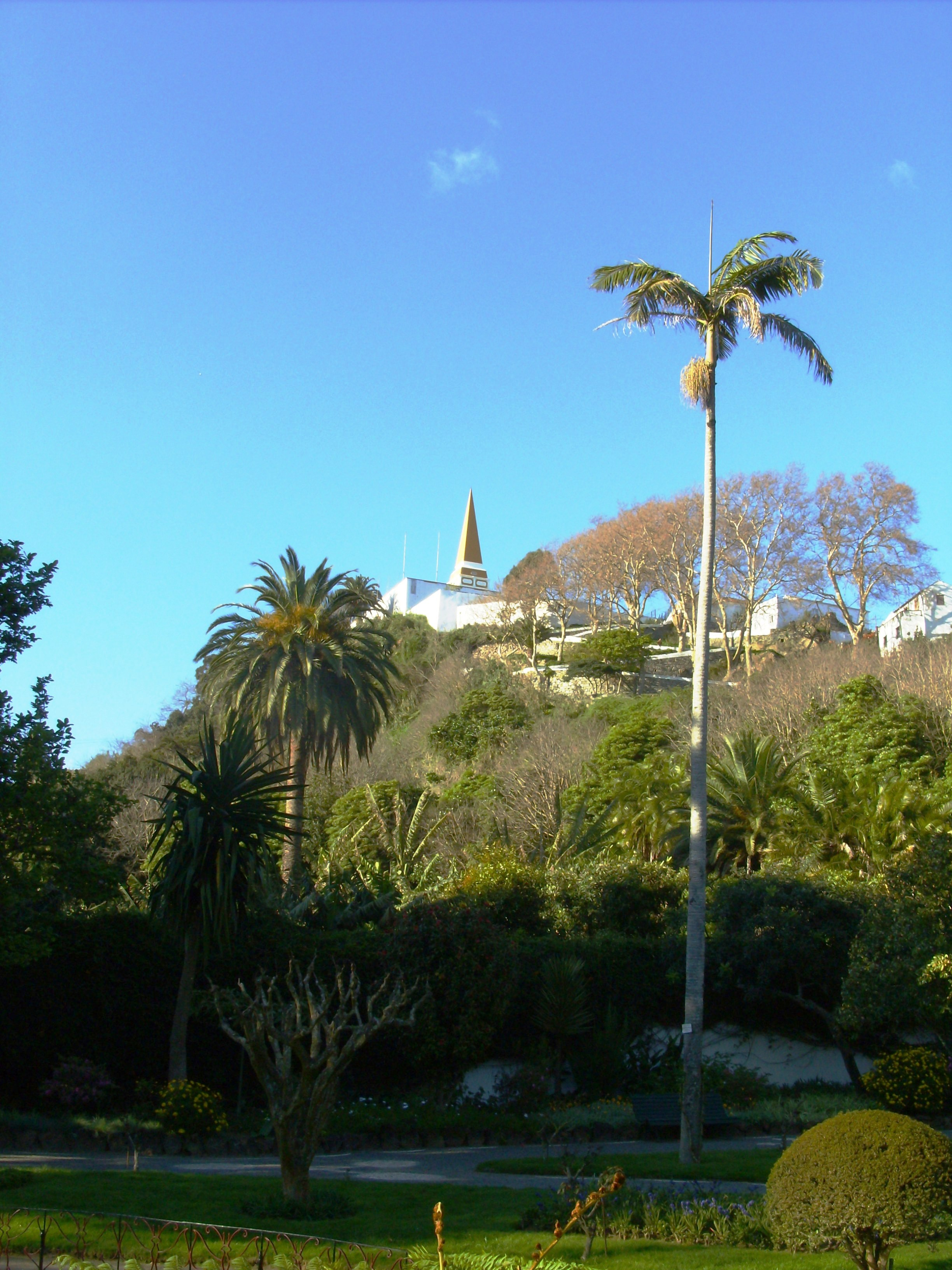
The obelisk of the Alto da Memoria as seen from the gardens

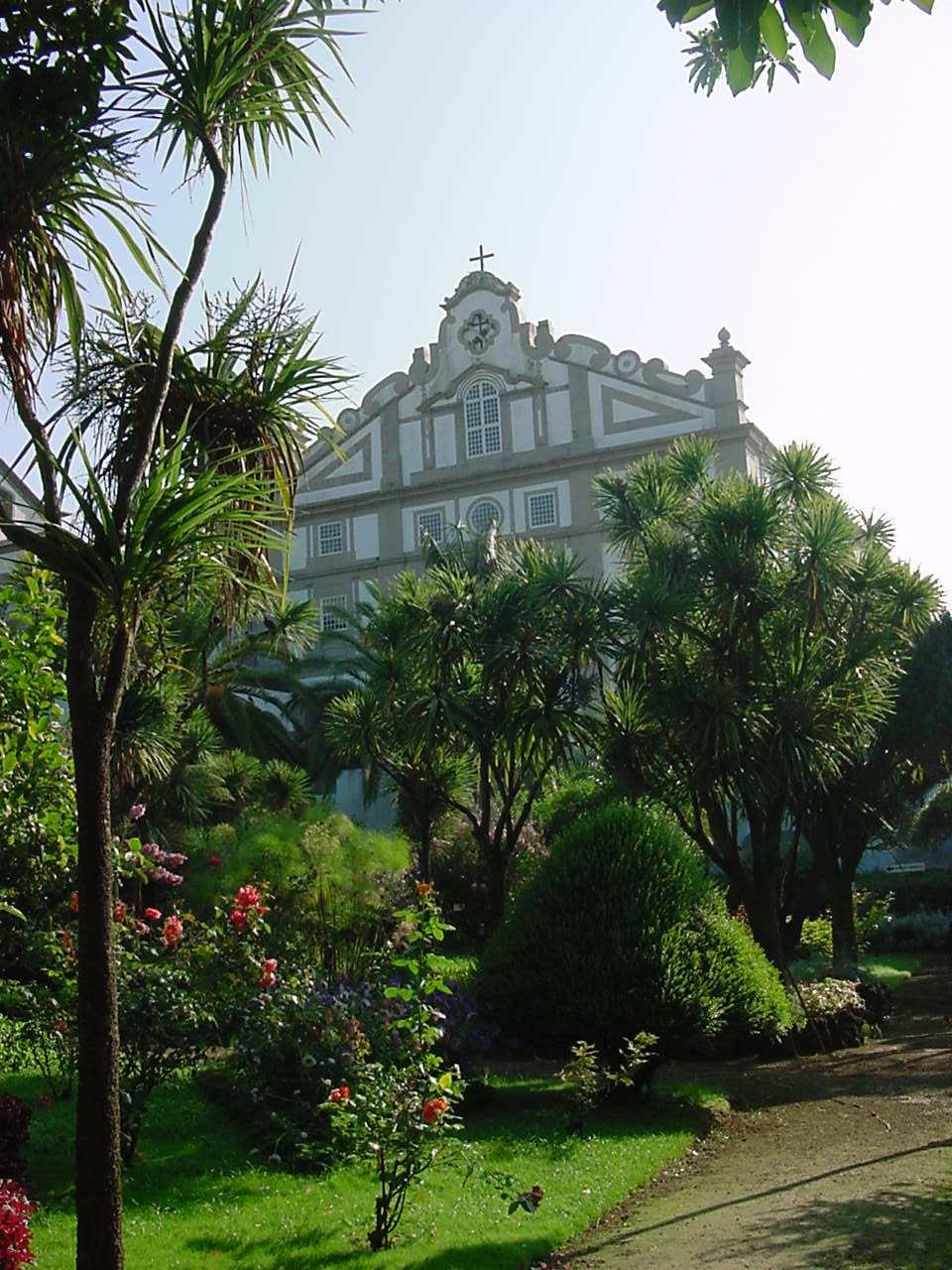
The imposing facade of the Church of Nossa Senhora da Guia, part of the Convent of São Francisco complex on the eastern border of the gardens

It occupies the area to the west of the historical Convent of São Francisco, the home to Museum of Angra do Heroísmo, and includes various areas landscaped along the flanks of a hilltop. The gardens are roughly defined by the Ladeira de São Francisco (in the south), Rua da Direita and Rua do Marques (in the west), the former convent (in the east) and the Rua do Pisão (in the north), delineated by iron wrought gates, basalt walls and Portuguese paving stone.

The pinnacle of the gardens is the promontory of the Alto da Memória (dedicated to former Pedro IV), constructed between 1845 and 1856, and which was raised on the grounds of the former Castelo dos Moinhos (Castle of Windmills).

The gardens were implanted in the churchyard of the Franciscan and Jesuit convents, and still retains several vestiges of their use. First, the Tanque do Preto, a water tank that was used historically for irrigating the gardens on the walkway towards the Alto da Memoria. Apart from this pond, the tank is identifiable for its hybrid black statute/carving of a stylized Brazilian-Amerindian blowing water from a tube. Another, is the group of four azulejo panels representing the prodigal son, which was produced in Lisbon around 1740, showing various figures, rural scenes and domestic life.

Although attributed to Afonso de Castro, its modern conception is attributed to the Belgian agronomist Francisco José Gabriel. In its beginnings were various aesthetics, including rustic, French geometric and English Romantic garden styles, forming a cultural mosaic. Around the band-shelter, on the lowest level of the garden, is an area primarily based on the traditional French garden.

Its construction was, primarily, initiated as a public footpath, but expanded into an endemic garden before taking on the form of botanical garden.

== Flora ==
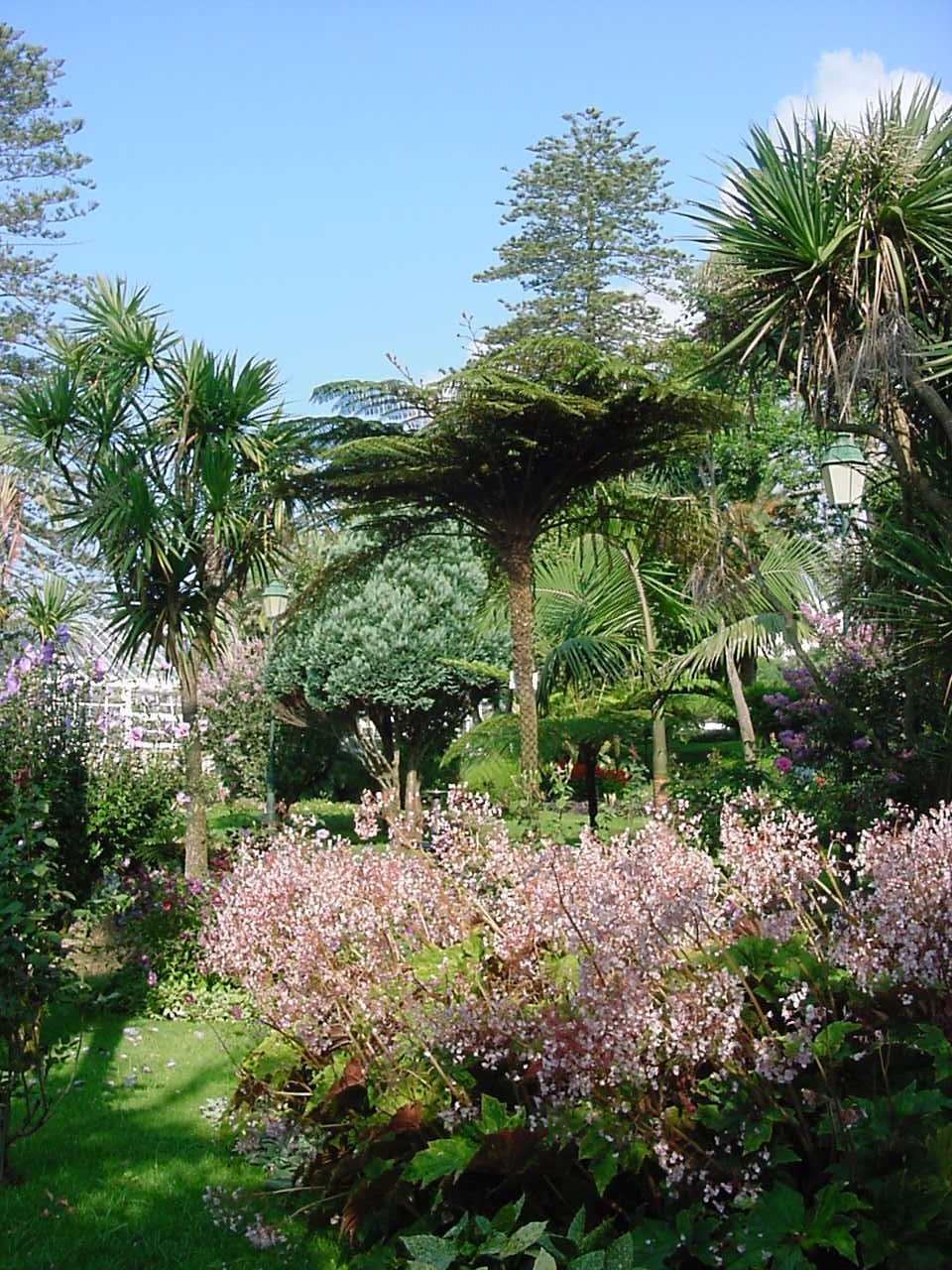
Some of the large arboreal ferns and endemic plants within the garden

It is a regular botanical garden, noted for the number of species of endemic and exotic plants, transported to the island since the period of the Portuguese discoveries, and includes both tropical and subtropical species, as well as:

- Two large examples of Araucária (Araucaria heterophylla)
- Eucalyptus
- Pohutukawa (Metrosideros excelsa)
- Palm trees (specifically the Phoenix, Livistona and Archontophoenix varieties)
- Liriodendrons (Liriodendron tulipifera)
- Magnólias
- Camellias
- Hibiscus
- Strawberry tree (Arbutus unedo)
- Arboreal ferns (Cyathea)
- Zamias
- Poinsettias (Euphorbia pulcherrima)
- Laurel (Laurus nobilis)
- Plumeria (Plumeria rubra).
