= Nossa Senhora da Conceição (Angra do Heroísmo) =

- Civil parish
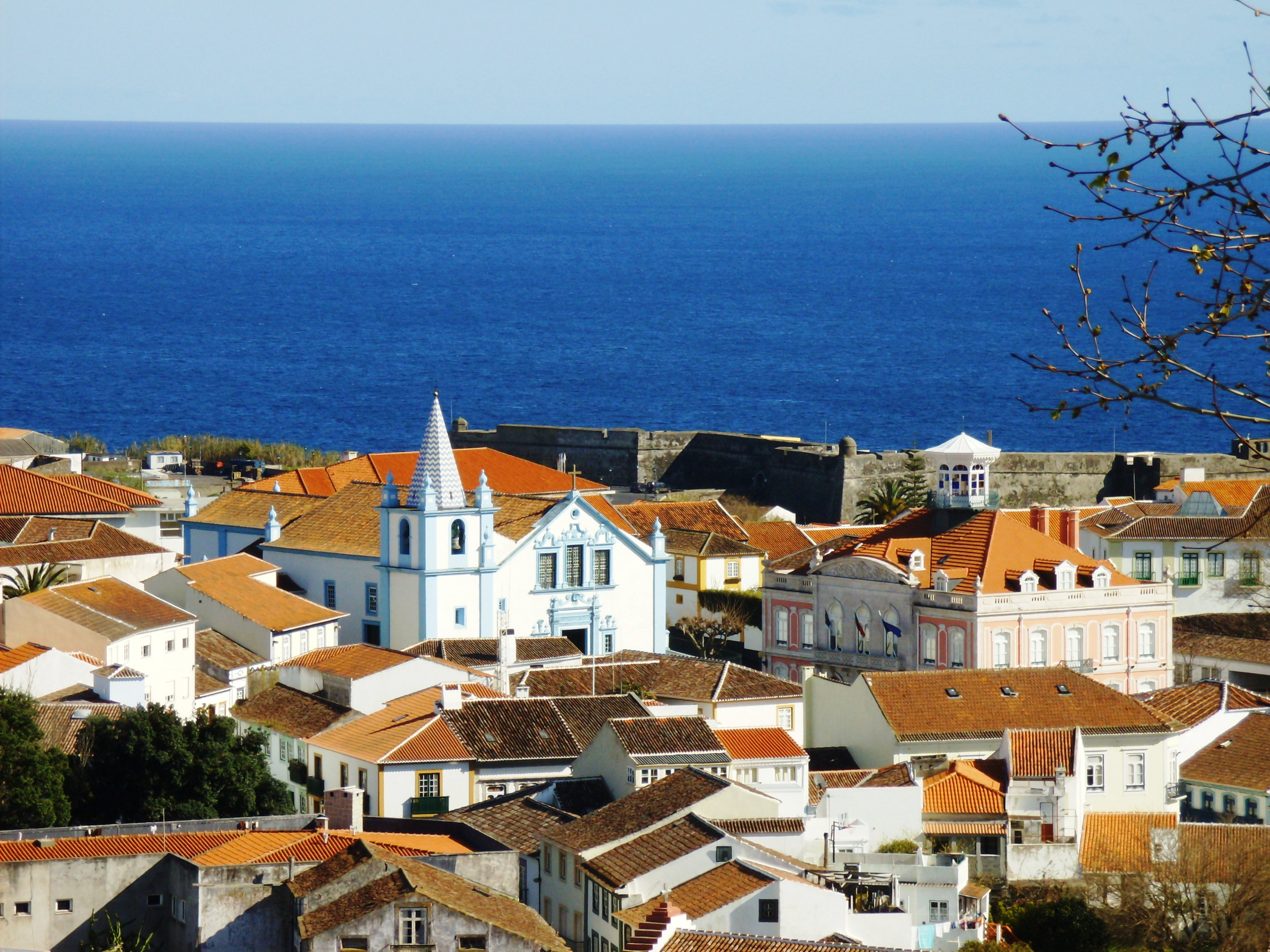
- Nestled within the urban area, the parish the Church of Our Lady of Conception from which the parish received its name

- Location in the Azores Nossa Senhora da Conceição (Terceira)
- Coordinates: 38°39′20″N 27°12′50″W
- Country: Portugal
- Auton. region: Azores
- Island: Terceira
- Municipality: Angra do Heroísmo
- Established: Settlement: fl. 1460; Parish: c. 1553

Area
  - Total: 2.44 km^{2} (0.94 sq mi)
- Elevation: 40 m (130 ft)

Population (2011)
  - Total: 3,717
  - Density: 1,520/km^{2} (3,950/sq mi)
- Time zone: UTC−01:00 (AZOT)
  - Summer (DST): UTC+00:00 (AZOST)
- Postal code: 9700- 053
- Area code: 292
- Patron: Nossa Senhora da Conceição
- Website: www.jfconceicao.net

Nossa Senhora da Conceição (pronounced [ˈnɔ.sɐ sɨ.ˈɲɔ.ɾɐ dɐ kõ.sɐj.ˈsɐ̃w]) is a parish in the municipality of Angra do Heroísmo on the island of Terceira located in the Azores.

== Demographics ==
The population in 2011 was 3,717, in an area of 2.44 km^{2} (0.94 sq mi).

== Notable natives ==
- Helder Antunes
