= List of lava tubes =

A lava tube, or pyroduct, is a natural conduit formed by flowing lava from a volcanic vent that moves beneath the hardened surface of a lava flow. If lava in the tube empties, it will leave a cave.

== Africa ==
=== Democratic Republic of the Congo ===
- Unnamed cave along the Kakomeru climbing route of Mt. Nyamulagira

=== Ethiopia ===
- 70 m lava tube cave has been recorded southeast of Addis Ababa and a smaller example on K'one Volcano

=== Kenya ===
- Chyulu Hills – contains nearly 100 tubes
- Elmenteita Badlands north of Mt. Eburru – several small caves
  - Leviathan Cave – At 12.5 kilometres, it is the longest lava tube in Africa.
- Emuruangogolak Volcano caves
- North Chyulu hills area – 20 caves are known
  - Hells Teeth
  - Kimakia Caves
  - Mathioni
  - Skull Caves
  - Kimakia Cave
- Lake Tillam, near Korosi Volcano – several known lava tubes
- Mount Suswa – around 40 known caves totaling around 11 km
- Menengai Caldera – single vent-like cave
- Nyambeni Mountains near Maua – 2 known caves

=== Rwanda ===
- Musanze System – total 5.1 km
  - Ubuvomo bwa Musanze – 4.56 km
  - Ubuvomo bwa Nyrabadogo – 1.5 km

=== Tanzania ===
- Mount Kilimanjaro Mawenzi lava tube system (at least 5)

=== Uganda ===
- Garama Cave – Kigesi District, is 342 m long

== Asia ==
=== China ===
- Wudalianchi National Park and Global Geopark
  - Laoheishan volcano
    - Fairy Palace Cave
    - Waterfall Palace Cave
  - East Jiaodebushan volcano
    - Ice Cave
    - Underground Ice River
- Jingpo Hu National Park and Global Geopark
  - Weihuting Cave
  - Longyandongtian Cave (Dragon Rock Cave)
  - Shenshui Cave (Driven Water Cave)
  - Gubingdong Cave (Ancient Ice Cave)
  - Jiemei Cave (Sisters Cave)
  - Kanlianmiying Cave (Anti-J Allied Army Secret Camp)
- Leiqiong Global Geopark – More than 30 tubes
  - Seventy Two Cave Lava Tunnel

=== Japan ===
- Fugaku Wind Cave
- Lake Sai Bat Cave
- Narusawa Ice Cave

=== Saudi Arabia ===
- Harrat Khaybar lava field – Umm Jirsan lava tube – 1.5 km long (Pint 2009)

=== South Korea ===
- Geomunoreum Lava Tube System
  - Gimnyeonggul
  - Manjanggul – more than 8 kilometers long, located in Jeju Island, is a popular tourism spot.

== Europe ==
=== Iceland ===
- Búri (cave)
- Raufarhólshellir
- Surtshellir – For a long time, this was the longest known lava tube in the world.
- Víðgelmir

=== Italy ===
- Grotta del Gelo on Mount Etna
- Grotta dei Tre Livelli – lava tube system on three levels at Mount Etna

=== Portugal ===
- Azores
  - Algar do Carvão
  - Furna de Água
  - Furnas do Cavalum
  - Galerias da Feteira
  - Gruta Brisa Azul
  - Gruta das Agulhas
  - Gruta das Cinco Ribeiras
  - Gruta das Mercês
  - Gruta das Torres
  - Gruta do Carvão
  - Gruta do Natal
  - Gruta do Zé Grande
  - São Vicente Caves

=== Spain ===
- Canary Islands
  - Cuevas de los Murciélagos
  - Cueva de los Verdes
  - Cueva del Viento
  - Jameos del Agua
  - Tunnel de la Atlantida
  - Cueva de los Verdes

== North America ==
=== Canada ===
- Nisga'a Memorial Lava Bed Provincial Park

=== United States ===
- Ape Cave – Washington (state)
- Bandera Volcano Ice Cave – New Mexico
- Cheese Cave – Washington (state)
- Indian Tunnel lava tube (and more than 250 other examples) in Craters of the Moon National Monument and Preserve, Idaho
- Derrick Cave – Oregon
- El Malpais National Monument, in western New Mexico
- Hālona Blowhole
- Kaumana Cave – Hawaii
- Kazumura Cave, Hawaii – Not only the world's most extensive lava tube, but at 65.5 kilometres (40.7 mi), it has the greatest linear extent of any cave known.
- Kuna Caves – Idaho
- Lava Beds National Monument – California
- Newberry National Volcanic Monument – Oregon
  - Arnold Lava Tube System
  - Boyd Cave – Oregon
  - Horse Lava Tube System
    - Redmond Caves
  - Lava River Cave
  - Lava Top Butte basalt
  - Skeleton Cave
- Lava River Cave – Arizona
- Mammoth Cave – Utah
- Niter Ice Cave – Idaho
- Pluto's Cave – California
- Skylight Cave – Oregon
- Snow Canyon State Park - Utah
- Subway Cave Lava Tubes – Lassen National Forest, California
- Wilson Butte Cave – Idaho

== Oceania ==
=== Australia ===
- Undara Volcanic National Park – Queensland

=== Galapagos ===
- Bellavista lava tunnel

=== New Zealand ===
- Auckland volcanic field Includes more than 50 lava tubes
  - Wiri Lava Cave

=== Samoa ===
- Alofaaga Blowholes

== Extra Terrestrial ==
- Lunar lava tube
- Martian lava tube
