= Furna (disambiguation) =

Furna may refer to:

- Furna, a municipality in Switzerland
- Furna (Brava), a settlement on the island of Brava in Cape Verde
- Furna (Fogo), a settlement on the island of Fogo in Cape Verde
- Achada Furna, a settlement on the island of Fogo in Cape Verde
- Vilarinho da Furna, a former village in Portugal
- Furna de Água, a cave in the Azores

== See also ==
- Furni (disambiguation)
- Furno
