= List of World Heritage Sites in South Korea =

Location of World Heritage Sites in South Korea. Blue dots indicate the dolmen sites, orange dots are the Sansa temples, green dots are the Getbol sites, brown dots are the Gaya Tumuli, purple dots are the Royal Tombs of the Joseon dynasty, and yellow are the Seowon sites. Changdeokgung and Jongmyo are located in Seoul, as well as some of the Joseon tombs.

The United Nations Educational, Scientific and Cultural Organization (UNESCO) World Heritage Sites are places of importance to cultural or natural heritage as described in the UNESCO World Heritage Convention, established in 1972. Cultural heritage consists of monuments (such as architectural works, monumental sculptures, or inscriptions), groups of buildings, and sites (including archaeological sites). Natural heritage consists of natural features (physical and biological formations), geological and physiographical formations (including habitats of threatened species of animals and plants), and natural sites which are important from the point of view of science, conservation, or natural beauty. The Republic of Korea (South Korea) accepted the convention on 14 September 1988, making its historical sites eligible for inclusion on the list. There are 17 World Heritage Sites in South Korea and a further 12 on the tentative list.

The first three sites of South Korea, the Haeinsa Temple, Jongmyo Shrine, and Seokguram Grotto and Bulguksa Temple, were inscribed on the list at the 19th Session of the World Heritage Committee, held in Berlin, Germany, in 1995. The most recent site listed was Petroglyphs along the Bangucheon Stream, in 2025. Getbol and the Jeju Volcanic Island and Lava Tubes are natural sites; the other 14 sites are cultural.

== World Heritage Sites ==
UNESCO lists sites under ten criteria; each entry must meet at least one of the criteria. Criteria i through vi are cultural, and vii through x are natural.

World Heritage Sites
Site	Image	Location (province)	Year listed	UNESCO data	Description
Seokguram Grotto and Bulguksa Temple	A large stone Buddha statue in a cave	North Gyeongsang	1995	736; i, iv (cultural)	The Buddhist complex was founded in the 8th century under the Silla kingdom. The Seokguram Grotto (pictured), an artificial grotto constructed of granite, is a masterpiece of East Asian Buddhist art and contains a large statue of Buddha. The Bulguksa Temple was completed in 774. It comprises several wooden buildings on stone terraces. Both the temple and the grotto have been renovated several times, in line with traditional techniques.
Haeinsa Temple Janggyeong Panjeon, the Depositories for the Tripitaka Koreana Woodblocks	Series of woodblocks deposited in a temple	South Gyeongsang	1995	737; iv, vi (cultural)	Tripitaka Koreana is a collection of over 80000 wooden printing blocks, engraved in the 13th century. They represent the most complete collection of Buddhist texts, laws and treaties. The Haeinsa Temple, with the two Janggyeong Panjeon buildings, was built in the 15th century with the purpose of storing the woodblocks, with innovative approaches to ensure the conservation. The temple is also an important Buddhist pilgrimage site.
Jongmyo Shrine	A Korean temple built on a stone platform	Seoul	1995	738; iv (cultural)	Jongmyo Shrine is a Confucian royal shrine that houses the spirit tablets of the kings and queens of the Joseon Dynasty. Originally constructed in the 14th century and destroyed during the Japanese invasion in the 16th century, it was rebuilt in the early 17th century and has since remained relatively intact. Jongmyo jerye, ancestor worship rituals, are still held at the shrine.
Changdeokgung Palace Complex	A large Korean palace hall	Seoul	1997	816; ii, iii, iv (cultural)	The palace was built in the 15th century during the Joseon Dynasty. It was burned down during the Japanese invasion in the 16th century, but reconstructed soon afterwards and served as the main residence of the kings for the next 250 years. The layout of the palace and the surroundings follows the Confucian principles with gates, courts, and residential areas. The palace had an important influence on Korean architecture and garden design.
Hwaseong Fortress	Fortress gate and watchtower	Gyeonggi	1997	817; ii, iii (cultural)	The stone and brick fortress was built in the late 18th century in Suwon under King Jeongjo. The fortress incorporates the contemporary military solutions from Europe and East Asia, with floodgates, observation towers, bastions, and bunkers. It was used for defensive, administrative, and commercial purposes. The fortress has remained largely intact to the present day.
Gochang, Hwasun and Ganghwa Dolmen Sites	A dolmen in the field	Incheon, North Jeolla, Jeonnam-Gwangju	2000	977; iii (cultural)	This site comprises three assemblies of dolmens, megalithic funerary monuments of the Neolithic and Bronze Age cultures. Korea is home to the largest number of dolmens in the world. Different types of dolmens provide information about culture and rituals of the societies that built them. A dolmen from the Ganghwa Island is pictured.
Gyeongju Historic Areas	A stone tower serving as an astronomical observatory	North Gyeongsang	2000	976; ii, iii (cultural)	The Silla kingdom ruled Korea from 57 BCE to 935 CE. The site comprises areas with remains of Buddhist temples, palaces, and related buildings. The stone statues, reliefs, pagodas, and remains of other monuments represent some of the most outstanding examples of Buddhist art in Korea, mostly dating between the 7th and 10th centuries. The Tumuli park contains several royal tombs, including the Flying Horse Tomb. The excavations of the tombs produced rich gold, glass, and ceramic grave goods. Cheomseongdae, an astronomical observatory from the 7th century, is pictured.
Jeju Volcanic Island and Lava Tubes	Mountain flowers and a mountain in the background	Jeju	2007	1264bis; vii, viii (natural)	Jeju Island is a volcanic island on the south tip of the Korean peninsula. A shield volcano, it exhibits several volcanic features, including prominent Geomunoreum lava tubes and the Seongsan Ilchulbong tuff cone. The peak, Hallasan (pictured), is the highest mountain in South Korea. It contains a lake-filled crater and waterfalls, and exhibits multi-shaped rock formations. A minor boundary modification of the site took place in 2018.
Royal Tombs of the Joseon Dynasty	Stone statues and other monuments around a royal tomb	Gyeonggi, Seoul, Gangwon	2009	1319bis; iii, iv, vi (cultural)	The tombs of the kings of the Joseon Dynasty date between 1408 and 1966. The site comprises 40 tombs at 18 locations. The layout of the tombs follows the Confucian principles and they are well integrated into the surrounding landscape. Ancestor worship rituals were held regularly during the Joseon period and the rituals are still annually carried out today by the Royal Family Organization and the worshiping society for each royal tomb. A minor border modification took place in 2013. The tomb of King Sejong the Great is pictured.
Historic Villages of Korea: Hahoe and Yangdong	Traditional houses with thatched roofs in a middle of the fields	North Gyeongsang	2010	1324; iii, iv (cultural)	The villages of Hahoe and Yangdong are two representative clan villages of Korea. They were founded in the 14th and 15th centuries, during the early Joseon period. They contain houses of lead families (yangban), thatched-roof houses for commoners, pavilions, study halls, and Confucian academies for learning. The setting of the villages in the mountain area inspired poets of the 17th and 18th centuries.
Namhansanseong	Korean-style fortress gate in the stone walls	Gyeonggi	2014	1439; ii, iv (cultural)	The Namhansanseong was constructed in the early 17th century, upon previous fortifications, to serve as the emergency Joseon capital. It could accommodate 4000 people and was defended by Buddhist monk-soldiers. The design of the mountain fortress drew from Chinese and Japanese influences based on defenses against the western-style firearms. It was influential in the design of other citadels in Korea. The North Gate is pictured.
Baekje Historic Areas	Fortress walls and a gate on the top of a hill	South Chungcheong and North Jeolla	2015	1477; ii, iii (cultural)	This site comprises monuments of the late Baekje Kingdom, dating from 475 to 660. They include the Gongsanseong fortress (pictured) in Gongju, royal tombs in Buyeo, and a royal palace and a temple in Iksan. The monuments and the archeological sites demonstrate the cultural and religious exchange between Korea, China, and Japan during the Baekje period.
Sansa, Buddhist Mountain Monasteries in Korea	Buddhist temple with a large golden statue in a mountain setting	several sites	2018	1562; iii (cultural)	This site comprises seven Buddhist monasteries, the Sansa, in the mountains of the southern part of the Korean peninsula. They were founded between the 7th and 9th centuries and are still functioning in the present day. They demonstrate the development of Buddhism in Korea through centuries. The Beopjusa temple is pictured.
Seowon, Korean Neo-Confucian Academies	Traditional Korean buildings surrounded by trees	several sites	2019	1498; iii (cultural)	This site comprises nine Neo-Confucian academies in central and southern parts of Korea. They were founded during the Joseon period, from the mid-16th to mid-17th centuries. Each seowon was led by the class of local intellectuals, the sarim, and functioned as a centre of learning, veneration, and interaction with other scholars. The seowon were built close to mountains and water sources as part of appreciating nature. They demonstrate the adaptation of Neo-Confucianism ideas from China to Korea. The Dosan Seowon is pictured.
Getbol, Korean Tidal Flats	Sunset over tidal flats with some islands in the background	North Jeolla, South Chungcheong, Jeonnam-Gwangju	2021	1591bis; x (natural)	Getbol are mudflats, or tidal flats, coastal sedimentary systems. They are important habitats for different types of organisms, including migrating birds and marine fauna such as clams, crabs, octopuses, and snails. The site comprises four areas, each representing another type of getbol (estuarine type, open embayed type, archipelago type, and semi-enclosed type). The site was extended in 2026. The Gochang getbol is pictured.
Gaya Tumuli	Gaya Tumuli in Changnyeong	South Gyeongsang, North Gyeongsang, North Jeolla	2023	1666; iii (cultural)	This site comprises seven tumuli complexes of the Gaya confederacy, from the 1st to the late 6th century CE. The seven sites correspond to the seven polities comprising the confederacy. Although they shared similar culture, they never developed into a unified state. The design of the tumuli was changing through centuries, as did the grave goods. Artifacts found at the site demonstrate the trade connections with Baekje and China. The site in Changnyeong County is pictured.
Petroglyphs along the Bangucheon Stream	Petroglyphs depicting animals and human figures in the Cheonjeon-ri	Ulsan	2025	1740; i, iii (cultural)	The petroglyphs on the cliffs along the Daegokcheon Stream, including the Daegok-ri and Cheonjeon-ri Petroglyphs, date to the Neolithic and early Bronze Age periods, with later inscriptions and engravings added in historical times. They depict humans, land and marine animals, tools, ships, and abstract patterns. Of special interest are the depictions of whales, with a theory proposing that whales were an object of worship of the people who lived in the area.

== Tentative list ==
In addition to sites inscribed on the World Heritage List, member states can maintain a list of tentative sites that they may consider for nomination. Nominations for the World Heritage List are only accepted if the site was previously listed on the tentative list. South Korea maintains 12 properties on its tentative list.

Tentative World Heritage Sites
Site	Image	Location (province)	Year listed	UNESCO criteria	Description
Kangjingun Kiln Sites	Historic site covered by grass and surrounded by a fence	Jeonnam-Gwangju	1994	ii, iii, iv, v, vi (cultural)	This site comprises several kiln sites from the Goryeo period (918–1392). They were used to produce the Goryeo ware, Korean pottery and porcelain such as earthenware and celadon. Over 400 kilns have operated in the area, some of which have been preserved until today.
Mt. Soraksan Nature Reserve	Mountain ridge at sunset	Gangwon	1994	vii, x (natural)	The mountains in the Taebaek range are characterized by prominent hills and ridges consisting of granite and gneiss rocks. Because of its natural beauty, the area is popular with tourists. It is home to several species of plants and endangered species of birds and mammals, including Tristram's woodpecker, long-tailed goral, and Siberian musk deer. There are two Buddhist temples in the park.
Sites of fossilized dinosaurs throughout the Southern seacoast	Fossils of dinosaur's eggs at Gojeongri	Jeonnam-Gwangju, South Gyeongsang	2002	viii, ix, x (natural)	This nomination comprises five sites where dinosaur remains from the Cretaceous period have been discovered. They include some of the world's largest assemblies of dinosaur footprints, nests with preserved eggs, as well as the footprints of webbed feet birds, the oldest of its kind so far discovered.
Salterns	Taepyeong Salt Field	Jeonnam-Gwangju	2010	iii, v (cultural)	This nomination comprises salterns, areas used to produce salt, in Sinan and Yeonggwang. The salt is produced using tidal flats, the brine is then moved to evaporation and crystallization ponds. The salterns date to the 19th century, when the salt-producing technology was introduced from Japan.
Ancient Mountain Fortresses in Central Korea	Fortress walls in a forest on a hill	North Chungcheong	2010	iii, iv, v (cultural)	This site comprises seven representative mountain fortresses in the central region of Korea. They were constantly developing in shape and served as fortifications against foreign invaders. Samnyeonsanseong is pictured, dating to the late 5th century. It is the highest and largest mountain stone fortress in Korea.
Upo Wetland	Wetland with lake and some mountains in the background	South Gyeongsang	2011	vii, x (natural)	Upo Wetland is the largest inland wetland in Korea, and is listed as a Ramsar site. It is an important stop for migratory birds on routes between Asia and Australia. Some of the birds include the falcated duck, Baikal teal, Eurasian spoonbill, taiga bean goose, and whooper swan. The area has been inhabited by humans for several millennia, archaeological excavations have uncovered remains of a wooden boat estimated to be 7500 years old.
Naganeupseong, Town Fortress and Village	Village with traditional thatched-roof houses	Jeonnam-Gwangju	2011	iii, iv, v, vi (cultural)	Naganeupseong is an example of a village inside a fortress from the Joseon period. This was a common type of settlement but most fortresses were dismantled under the Japanese colonial rule and Naganeupseong is one of the few that remain in the original form. The village contains administrative buildings, thatched-roof residential houses, a stele pavilion, and large old trees. In present, it is inhabited by traditional musicians.
Oeam Village	Village with traditional thatched-roof houses	South Chungcheong	2011	ii, iv, v, vi (cultural)	Oeam is a traditional Korean clan village. According to oral traditions, it was first inhabited about 500 years ago. It is a farming village, surrounded by fields. A particular feature of the village is that the inhabitants constructed artificial waterways to draw water into the houses.
Capital Fortifications of Hanyang: Hangyangdoseong Capital City Wall, Bukhansanseong Mountain Fortress and Tangchundaeseong Defense Wall	Namdaemun, the gate in the city walls	Seoul, Gyeonggi	2012	iii, iv (cultural)	The walls around Seoul, the newly founded Joseon capital, were first constructed at the end of the 14th century along the ridge of Seoul's inner mountains, containing the Hangyangdoseong, Bukhansanseong and Tangchundaeseong. The Hangyangdoseong stretched over 18.6 km (11.6 mi) and were renovated several times. At present, several sections of the walls remain, as well as the gates, bastions, signal fire mounds, and water gates. The Namdaemun gate, officially known as the Sungnyemun, is pictured.
Stone Buddhas and Pagodas at Hwasun Unjusa Temple	Several stone Buddha sculptures	Jeonnam-Gwangju	2017	i, iii, iv (cultural)	The temple was founded in the late 10th century or early 11th century during the Goryeo period and flourished until the 16th century when it was burned down during the Japanese invasion. From architectural perspective, it represents a departure from traditional temple layouts with several places of worship instead of a central one. Several pagodas and statues of Buddha were located in the temple and the surroundings, some of which have remained mostly intact. The temple saw renovations in the 19th and 20th centuries.
Archaeological Remains at the Hoeamsa Temple Site in Yangju City	Ruins of a Buddhist temple	Gyeonggi	2022	iii (cultural)	The Hoeamsa Temple in Yangju was built between 1374 and 1376 upon earlier structures. It was a temple of Seon, a Korean branch of the Zen Buddhism. This religious school flourished in Korea in the 14th century but declined under the Joseon Dynasty and the temple was closed in the 16th century. Although it fell into disrepair, the site layout, reflecting the architectural practices of the monastic school, has been preserved.
Sites of the Busan Wartime Capital	Memorial stone plates with names inscribed	Busan	2023	iii (cultural)	Busan served as the temporary capital over two periods during the Korean War (1950–1953). Nine nominated components illustrate the need to rapidly adapt the infrastructure to support the wartime government, to provide housing for the displaced people, and to facilitate international cooperation. These components include the temporary government complex and presidential residences, Pier 1 of the Port of Busan, two villages, and the United Nations Memorial Cemetery (remembrance wall pictured).

== See also ==
- List of South Korean tourist attractions
- List of Intangible Cultural Heritage elements in South Korea
- Historic Sites (South Korea)
