= Manjanggul =

Lava tube cave in South Korea

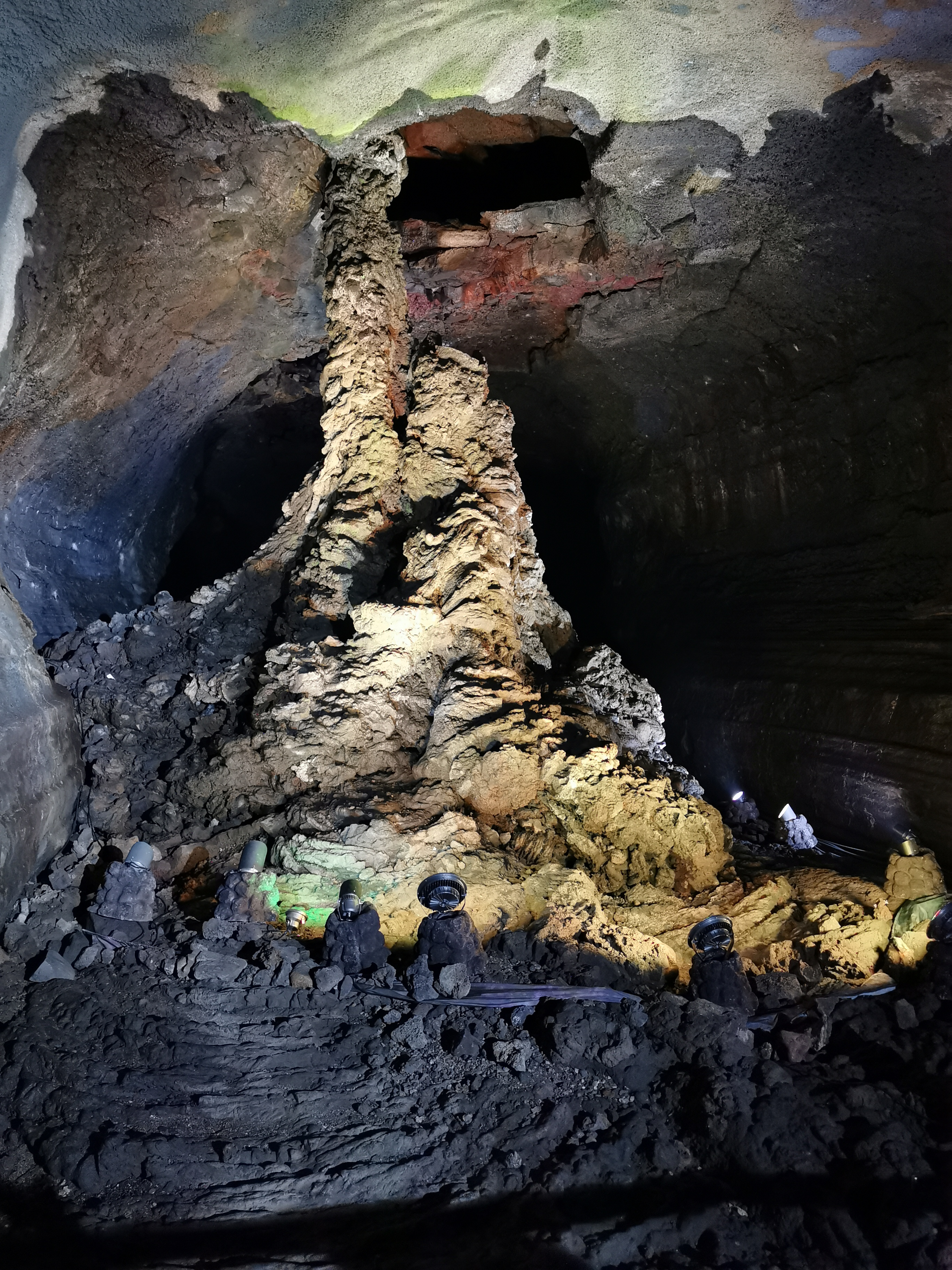
- In the cave, the largest known lava column in the world, reaching 7.6 metres (25 ft) in height (2020)
- Interactive map of Manjanggul
- Coordinates: 33.5282°N 126.7701°E
- Length: 8.928km (5½ miles)

- Manjanggul
- Hangul: 만장굴
- Hanja: 萬丈窟
- RR: Manjanggul
- MR: Manjanggul

Manjanggul (Korean: 만장굴) is a lava tube located in Gimnyeong-ri, Gujwaeup, Jeju City, South Korea. At up to 23 metres (75 ft) wide, 30 metres (98 ft) high and 8.928 km (5½ miles) long, it is the 12th-longest lava tube in the world and the second longest on Jeju Island. It is the only cave of the Geomunoreum Lava Tube System, considered one of the finest lava tube systems in the world. It is regularly open to the public, although a significant portion of the cave is closed to visitors. It is also part of the UNESCO World Heritage Site list, under the item Jeju Volcanic Island and Lava Tubes.

Lava stalactites and lava stalagmites, lava columns, lava flowstone, lava rafts, lava shelves, Among them, a lava column of 7.6 metres (25 ft) is the largest known in the world.

There are three entrances to the cave, although tourists are able to enter through just one of them (No. 2, facing southwards) and able to go up to 1 km (0.62 mi) into it.

Entrance No. 3 contains the most favorable habitats for cave life. Between entrances 1 and 2, there is a lower level main tube where most of creatures living in the cave can be found. In the Geomunoreum Lava Tube System, the Manjanggul Lava Tube has the greatest number of living creatures, including the Jeju cave-spider. In the upper part of Entrance 2, there are at least 30,000 common bent-wing bats forming the largest colony of bats confirmed to be living in Korea so far.

== Gallery ==
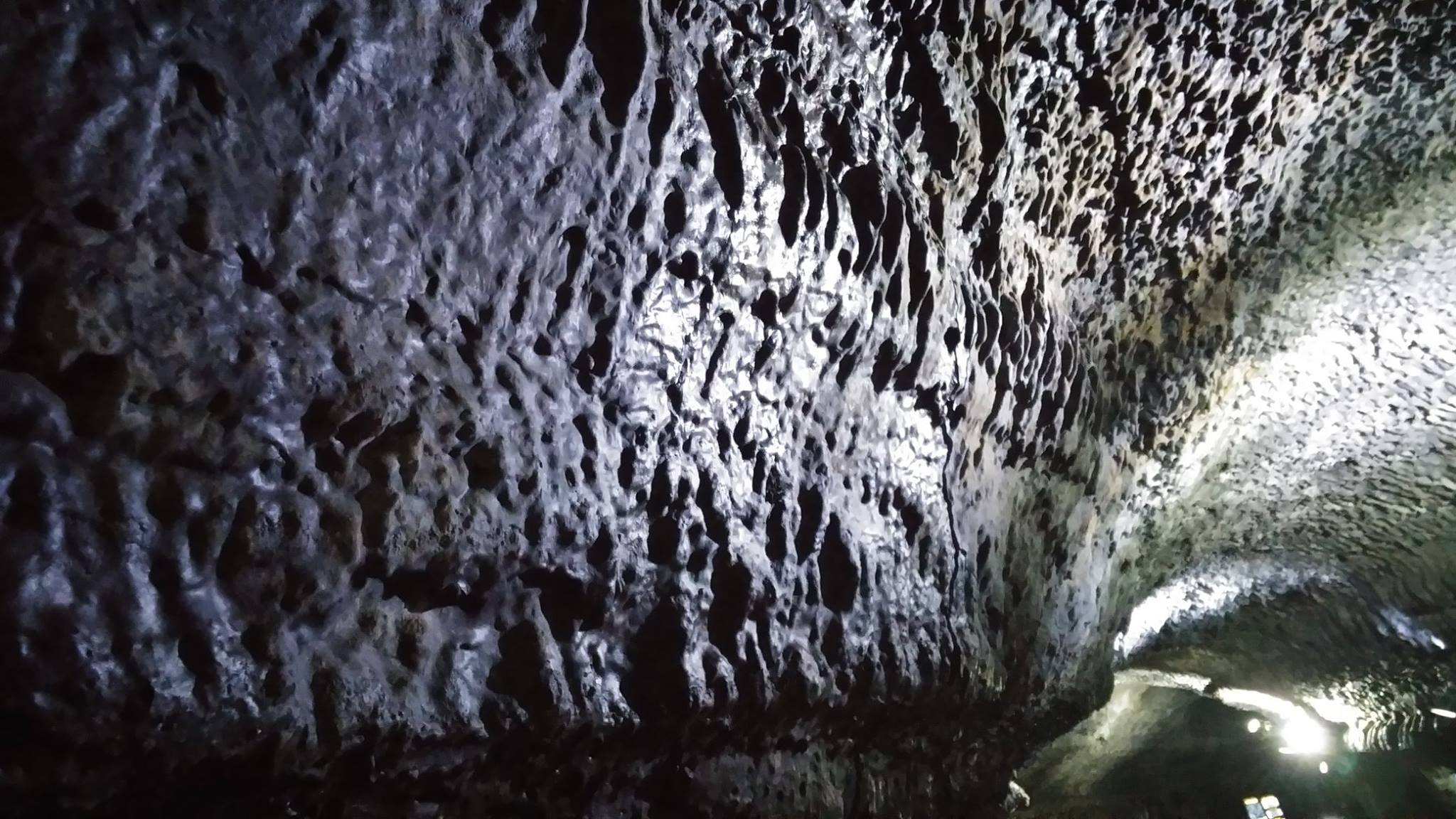
Details of the wall of the cave (2017)

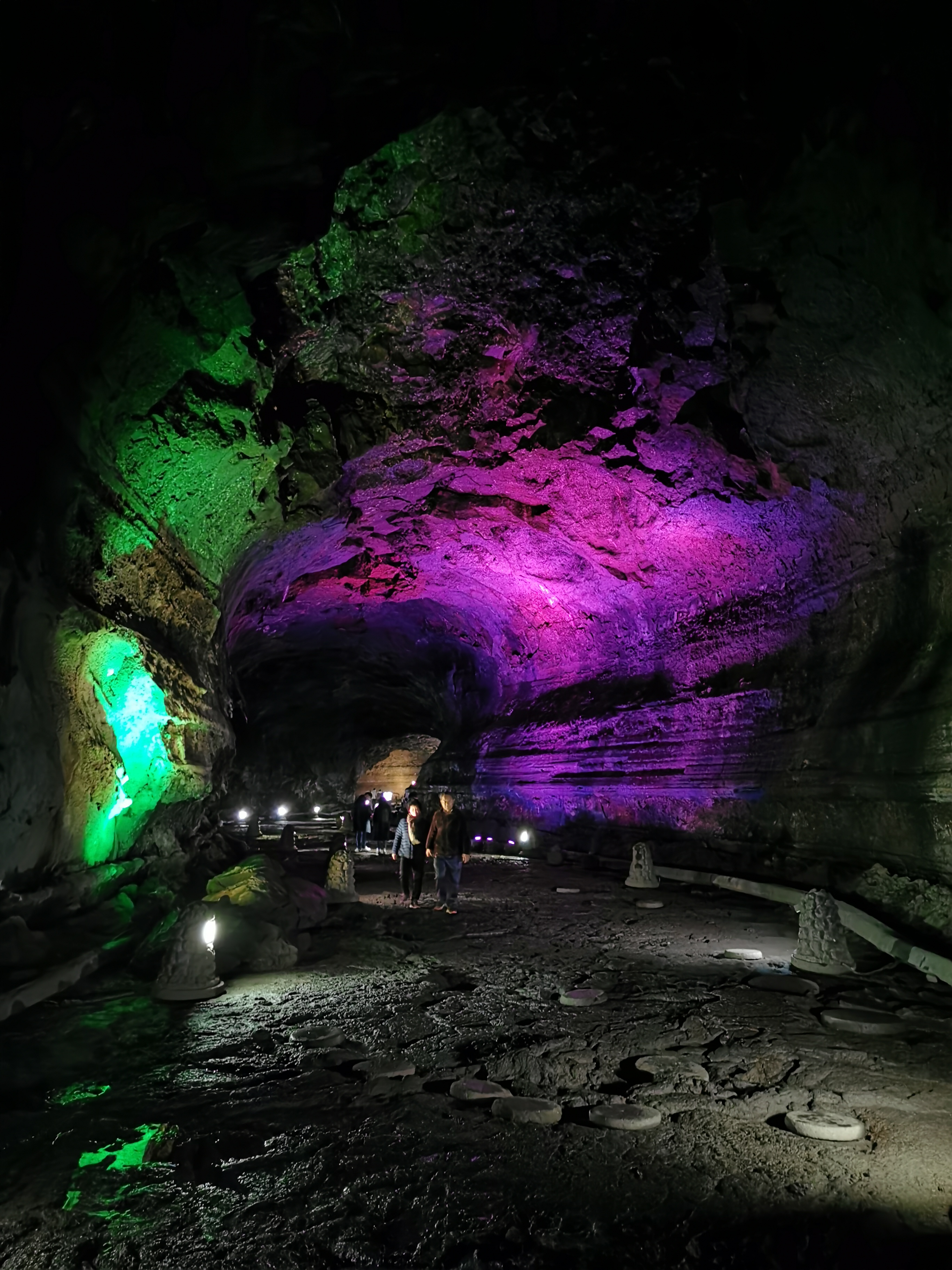
The cave, illuminated with colored lights (2020)

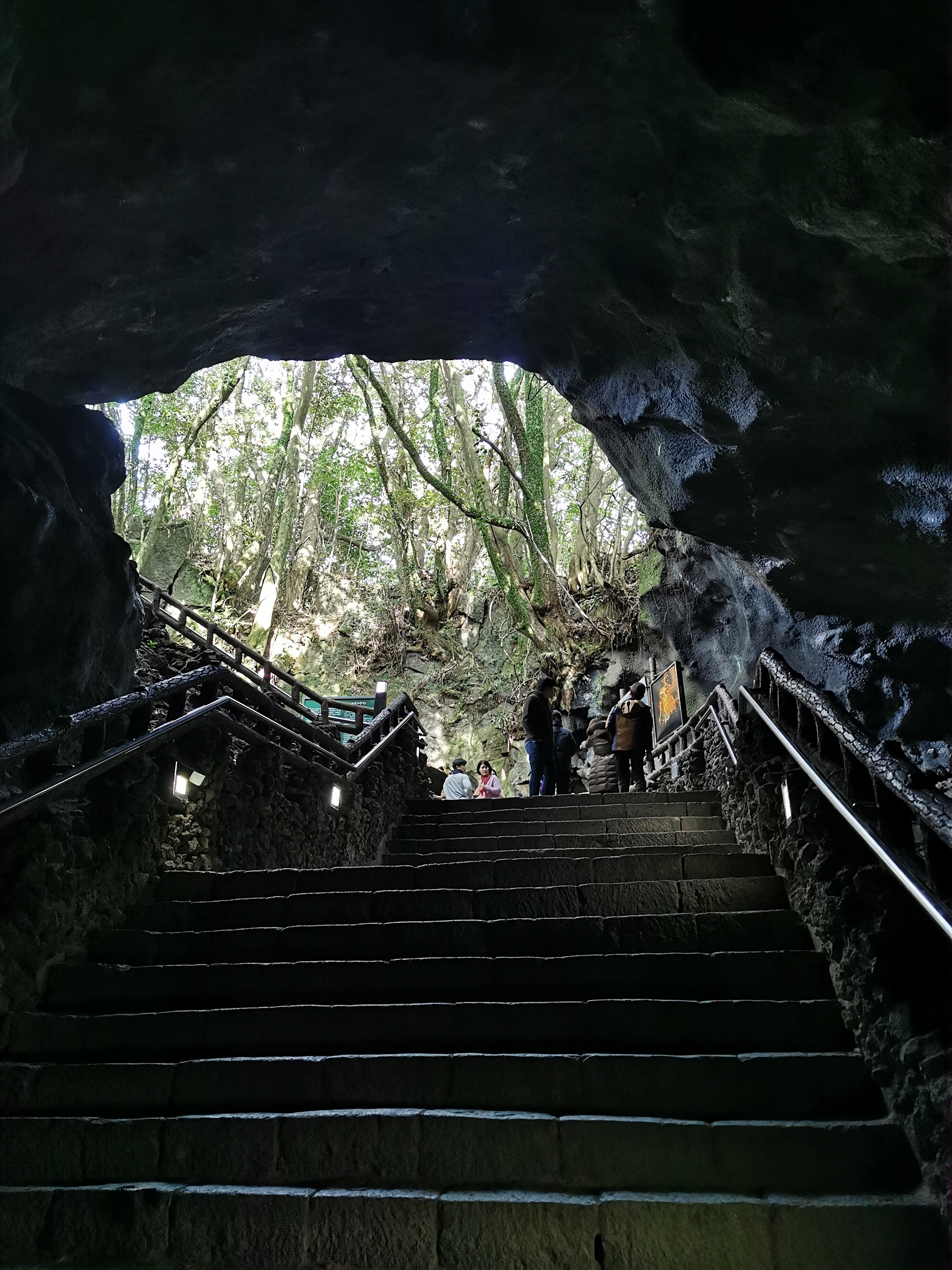
Looking out the exit of the cave (2020)

== See also ==
- List of World Heritage Sites in South Korea
- Jeju Volcanic Island and Lava Tubes
- Seongsan Ilchulbong
- Hallasan
- Jeju-do
- Geomunoreum Lava Tube System
- Gimnyeonggul
