= Furno =

Furno may refer to:

- Carlo Furno (1921–2015), Italian Catholic cardinal
- Giovanni Furno (1748–1837), Italian composer and famous music teacher
- Joshua Furno (born 1989), Italian rugby union player

Fictional characters

- William Furno, a character from Hero Factory (TV series)

== See also ==
- Furnos Maior and Furnos Minor, towns and bishoprics in present-day Tunisia
- Furna (disambiguation)
- Furni (disambiguation)
