= Gimnyeonggul =

Lava tube in Jeju City, South Korea

- Hangul: 김녕굴
- Hanja: 金寧窟
- RR: Gimnyeonggul
- MR: Kimnyŏnggul

The Gimnyeonggul (Korean: 김녕굴) is a lava tube located in Donggimnyeong-ri, Gujwa-eup, Jeju City, and it is one of the World Heritage Sites in South Korea.

The lava tube is about 705 m long, and is believed to be separated from Manjanggul Lava Tube by lava flows. The upper part of entrance is 12 m high and 4 m wide and is bent in a collapsed S shape. The upstream end of the passage was sealed with subsequent lava flows. The downstream passage is bi-level and the entrance is filled with sediments, most of which are carbonate sediments that had flown in from the beach. This is understood to be why there are lime features.

The upstream end part is covered by a rich natural forest and the other end is covered with sand dunes. There is a significant amount of sand inside the tube. Because very little organic material has infiltrated the tube, Gimnyeonggul does not offer favorable habitats for cave life. Around 20 species are living in the tube.

The Gimnyeong lava tube is also called "Gimnyeongsagul" or "Sagul (Snake Cave)", a name originating in ancient history. According to a legend, there was a big snake living in the cave, and the snakes demanded the yearly sacrifice of a girl. If people didn't make that offering to it, it caused natural disasters such as typhoons. A judge Mr. Lin Seo killed the snake in 1515. After that event, the legend states, the village was able to be in peace. By the entrance of the cave, a monument was established speaking highly of Mr. Lin Seo.

== See also ==
- Jeju Volcanic Island and Lava Tubes
- Seongsan Ilchulbong
- Hallasan
- Jeju Province
- Manjanggul
