= Seongsan Ilchulbong =

Volcano in Jeju Province, South Korea

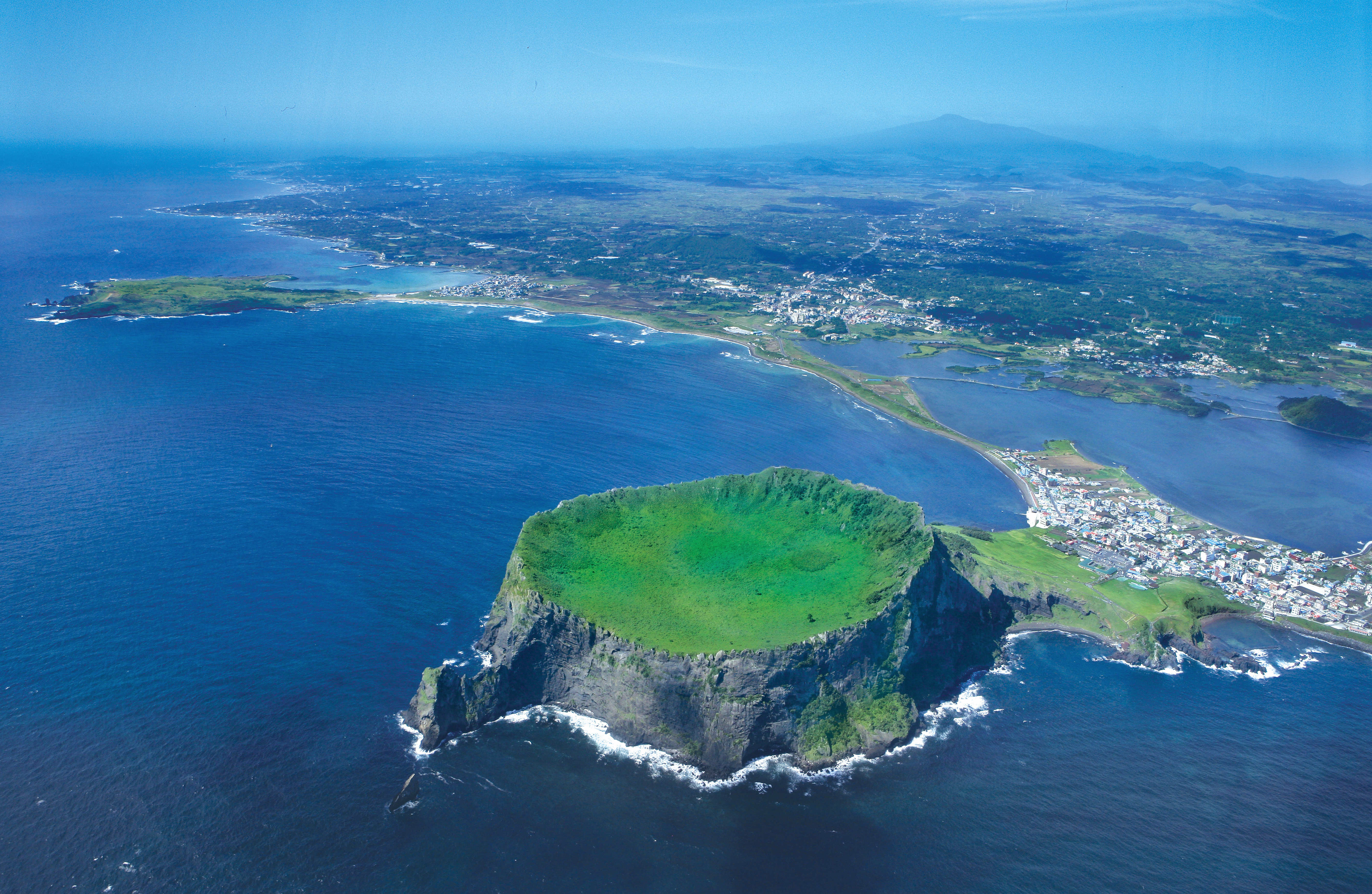
- The mountain from the air (2006)

Highest point
- Elevation: 182 m (597 ft)
- Coordinates: 33°27′31″N 126°56′31″E

Geography
- Country: South Korea
- Province: Jeju Province
- City: Seogwipo

Korean name
- Hangul: 성산일출봉
- Hanja: 城山日出峰
- RR: Seongsan ilchulbong
- MR: Sŏngsan ilch'ulbong

Seongsan Ilchulbong (Korean: 성산일출봉), also called Sunrise Peak, is a volcano on eastern Jeju Island, in Seongsan-ri, Seogwipo, Jeju Province, South Korea. It is 182 meters high and has a volcanic crater at the top.

Considered one of South Korea's most beautiful tourist sites, it is famed for being the easternmost mountain on Jeju, and thus the best spot on the island to see the first sunrise of the year. Seongsan Ilchulbong is a UNESCO Natural World Heritage Site, as part of the item Jeju Volcanic Island and Lava Tubes.

== Etymology ==
"Seongsan" and "Ilchulbong" are two alternate names for the mountain that only in recent years have been joined together into a single name.

"Seongsan" means "fortress mountain"; the mountain is said to resemble a Korean fortress. "Ilchulbong" means "sunrise peak". This latter name has reportedly been used since ancient times, and is derived from a belief that the mountain is one of the best places to view the sunrise on Jeju Island.

The mountain previously sometimes went by the name Cheongsan (청산; 靑山; lit. 'green/blue mountain'); this name is reportedly sometimes still used by generally elderly people.

== Description ==
In 2021, a study reported that a 600 m (2,000 ft) wide crater from before the formation of Seongsan Ilchulbong now partially overlaps with the mountain site.

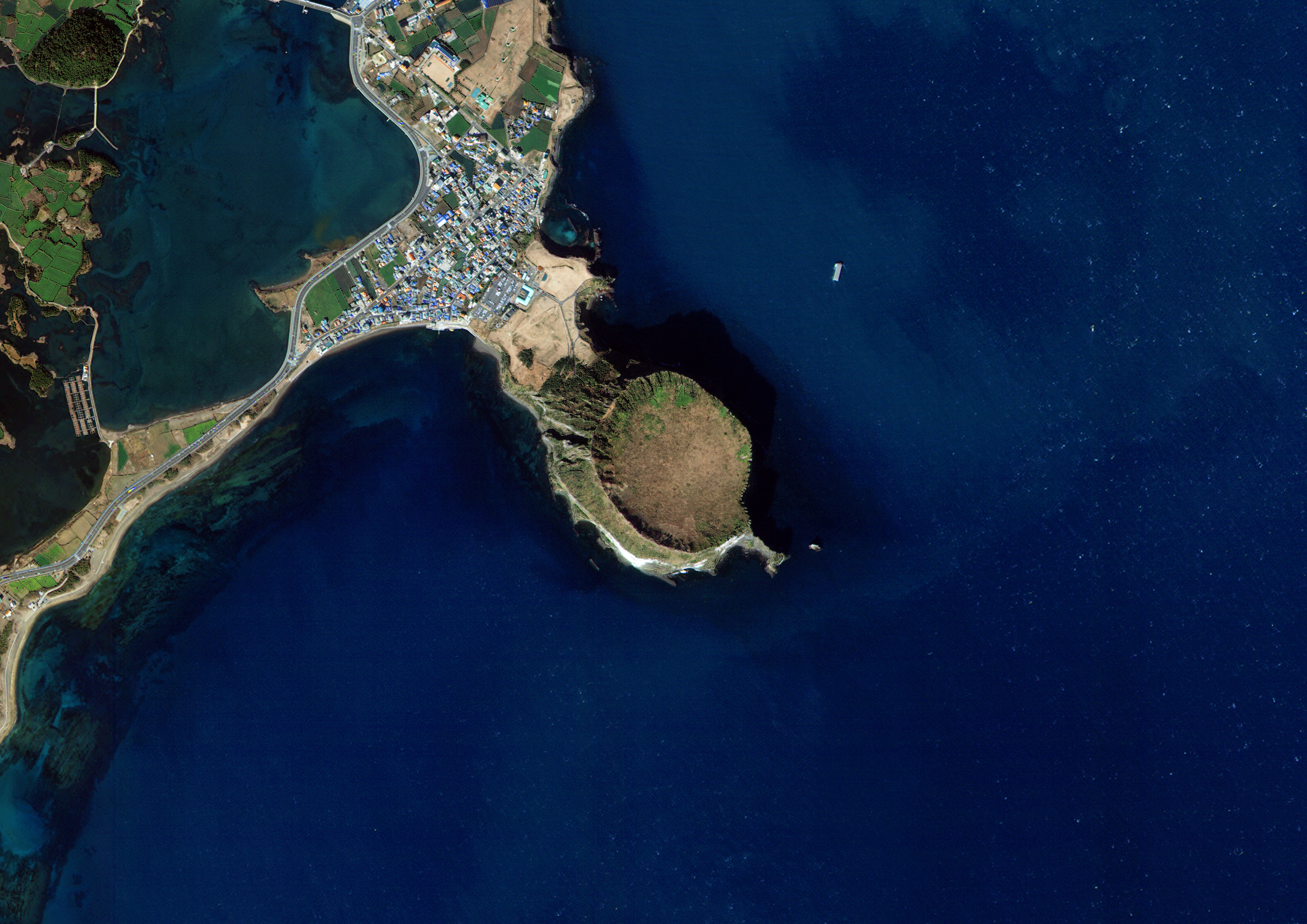
View of the mountain from space (2015)

Seongsan Ilchulbong was formed around 6,700 years ago, by Surtseyan-type hydrovolcanic activity upon a shallow seabed. The earliest eruption related to the peak occurred around 600 m (2,000 ft) to the east of the current crater. After the eruption stopped, magma could not flow through that spot, which caused magma to later emerge at the location of the peak. Over time, most of the early cones and parts of the later tuff cone were eroded by waves, leaving parts of the internal structure exposed along the cliffs. The mountain was originally disconnected from Jeju Island, but the accumulation of sediment caused the two to connect.

The mountain is considered to be geologically interesting and is actively studied by volcanologists.

The mountain is 182 m (597 ft) tall and has a diameter of 600 m (2,000 ft). It has a grassy volcanic crater at the top with a smooth, shallow bowl shape. The crater has an area of 2.64 km^{2} (1.02 mi^{2}) and is around 90 m (300 ft) above sea level.

A 2011 study reported that there are 240 taxa of plant species on the mountain.

== Tourism ==
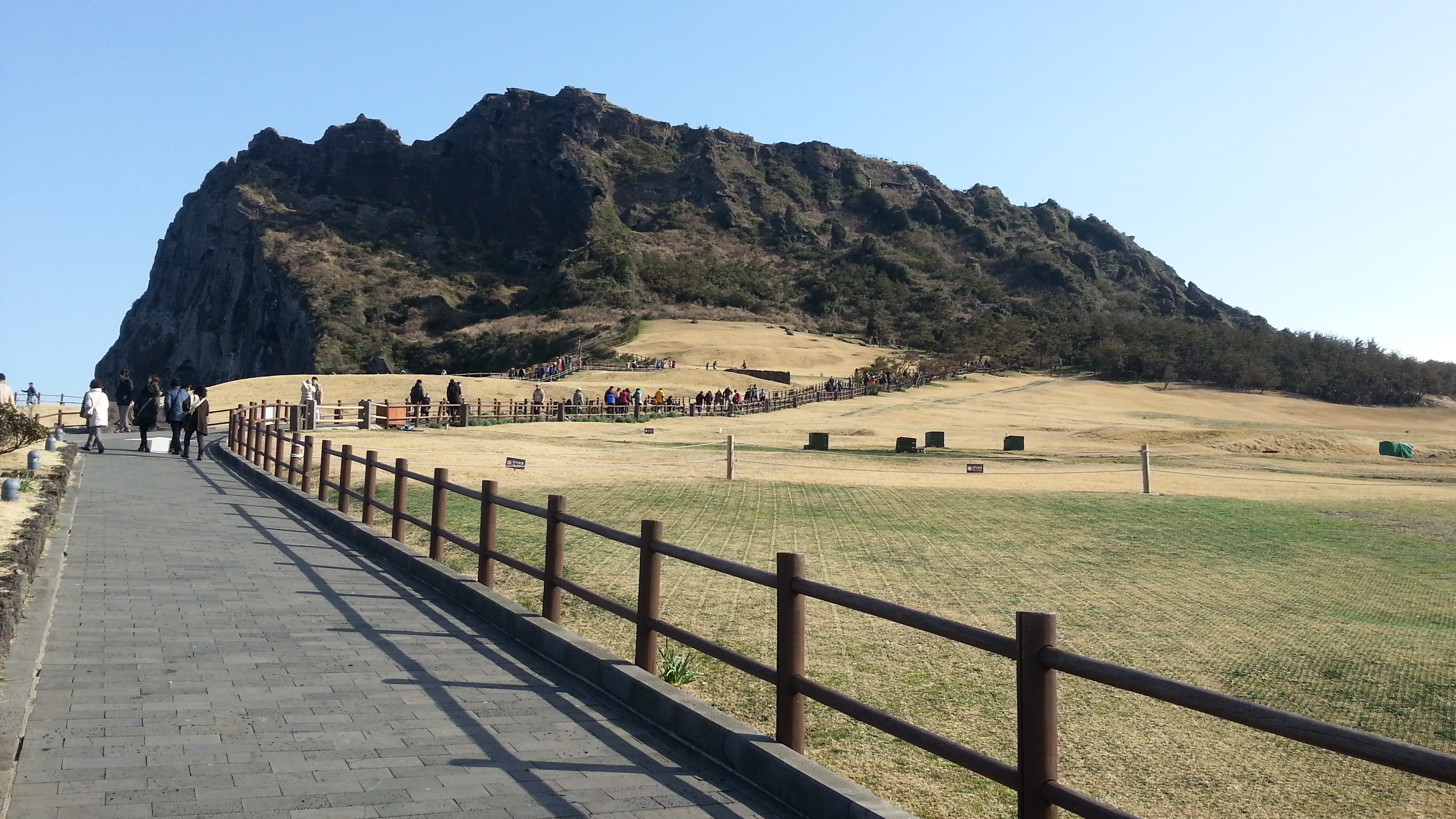
Hiking trail up the mountain (2013)

The mountain is a significant tourist attraction. In 2011, it received 2.45 million visitors. In 2022, it received 1,427,941 visitors. The mountain is especially popular for watching sunrises.

Tourists can ascend the mountain using a wooden deck staircase. It reportedly takes up to 30 minutes to ascend to the top. It is open from an hour before sunrise until 8 p.m. from November to February and until 9 p.m. from March to October. The mountain offers views of Hallasan, the island Udo, and the ocean.

Tourists can also tour the area around the mountain, and take cruises that offer views of the mountain and of Udo.

The mountain was designated a Natural Monument of South Korea on July 19, 2000. This status has reportedly aided conservation efforts on the mountain. On July 2, 2007, it was designated a UNESCO Natural World Heritage Site. In October 2010, it was named a Global Geopark Network site.

=== Seongsan Sunrise Festival ===
The Seongsan Sunrise Festival (성산일출축제) is a multi-day festival held around New Year's Day. A variety of activities and performances are held. Events like talent shows, parades, fireworks shows, and trail walking events have been attested to. In addition to popular music performances, performances like traditional gut Korean shamanic rituals are held. There is a countdown until the sunrise; fishermen reportedly light their boats and sound their whistles when it happens.

== History ==
During the Goryeo under Mongol rule period (13th to 14th centuries), ranches for horses were established near the mountain. During the 1910–1945 Japanese colonial period and near the end of World War II, the Imperial Japanese Navy dug caves into the sides of the mountain, where they stashed boats loaded with explosives. These boats were intended to stymie anticipated Allied landings on Jeju; the around 18 caves they dug remain, and are now Registered Cultural Heritages of South Korea. In the 20th century, farmers reportedly grew bamboo in the crater. People raised horses and lived inside the crater before it became an environmentally protected site in the late 20th century.

== Gallery ==
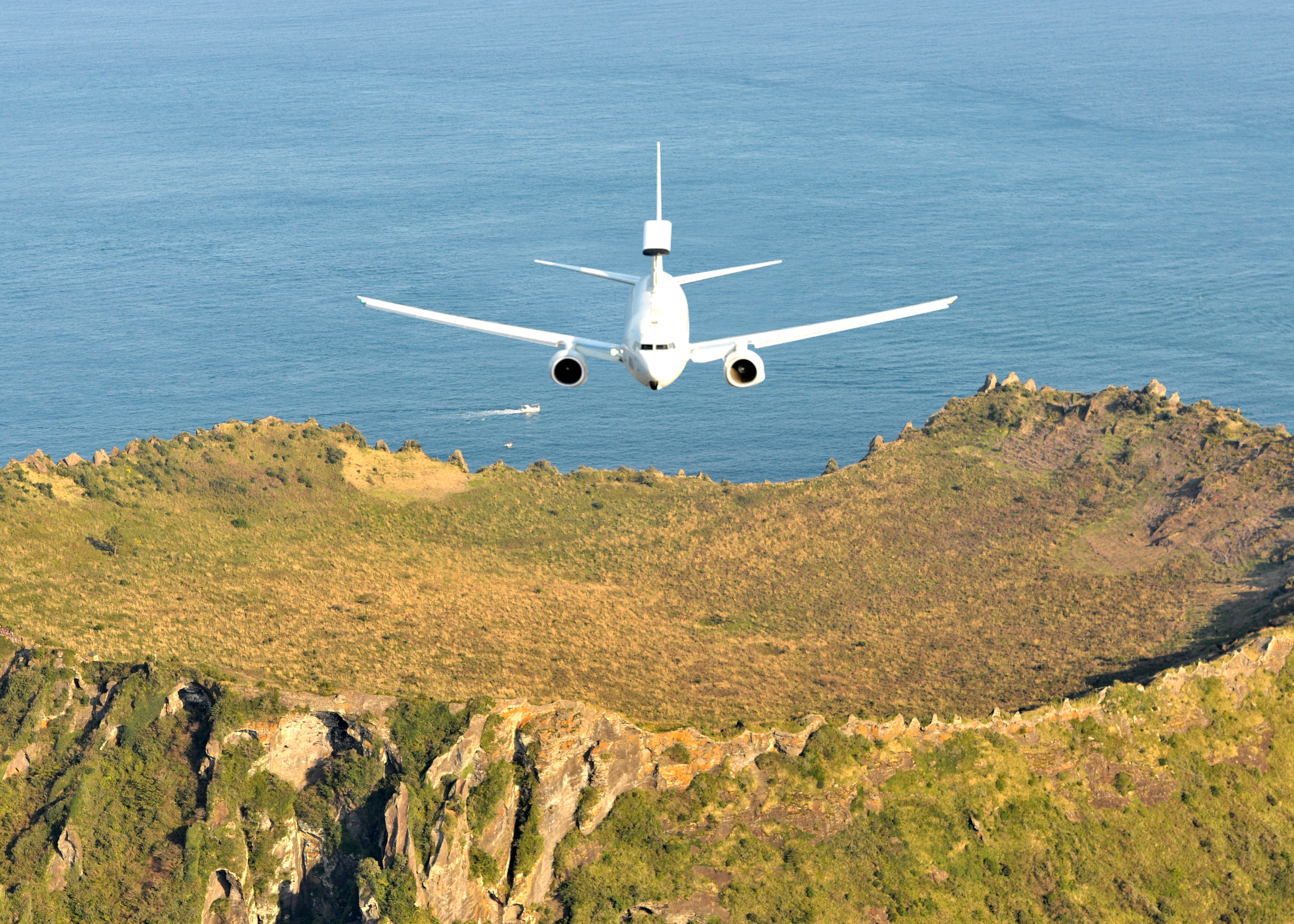
A Boeing 737 AEW&C flying over the mountain (2011)

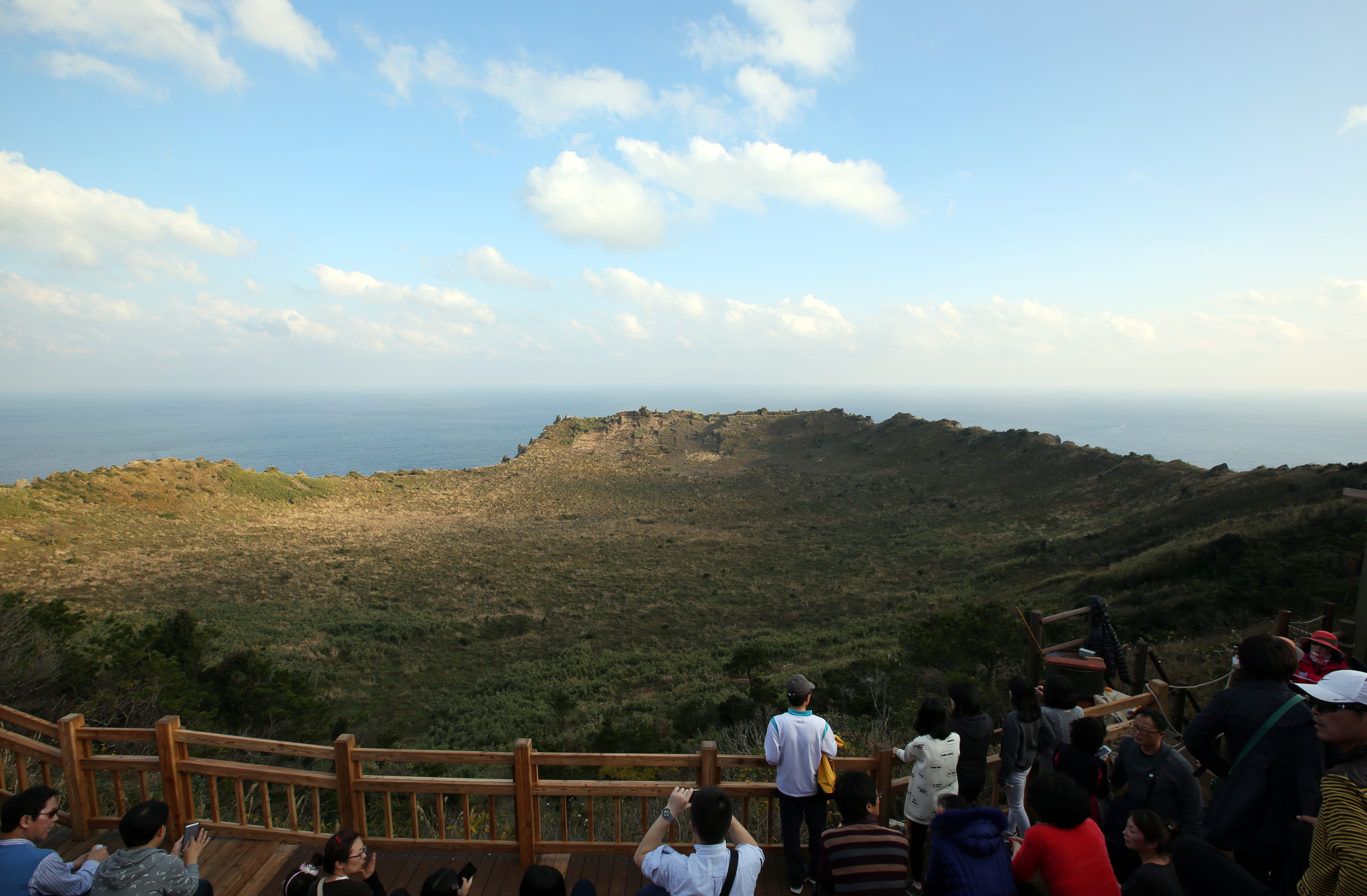
Tourists viewing the interior of the crater (2014)

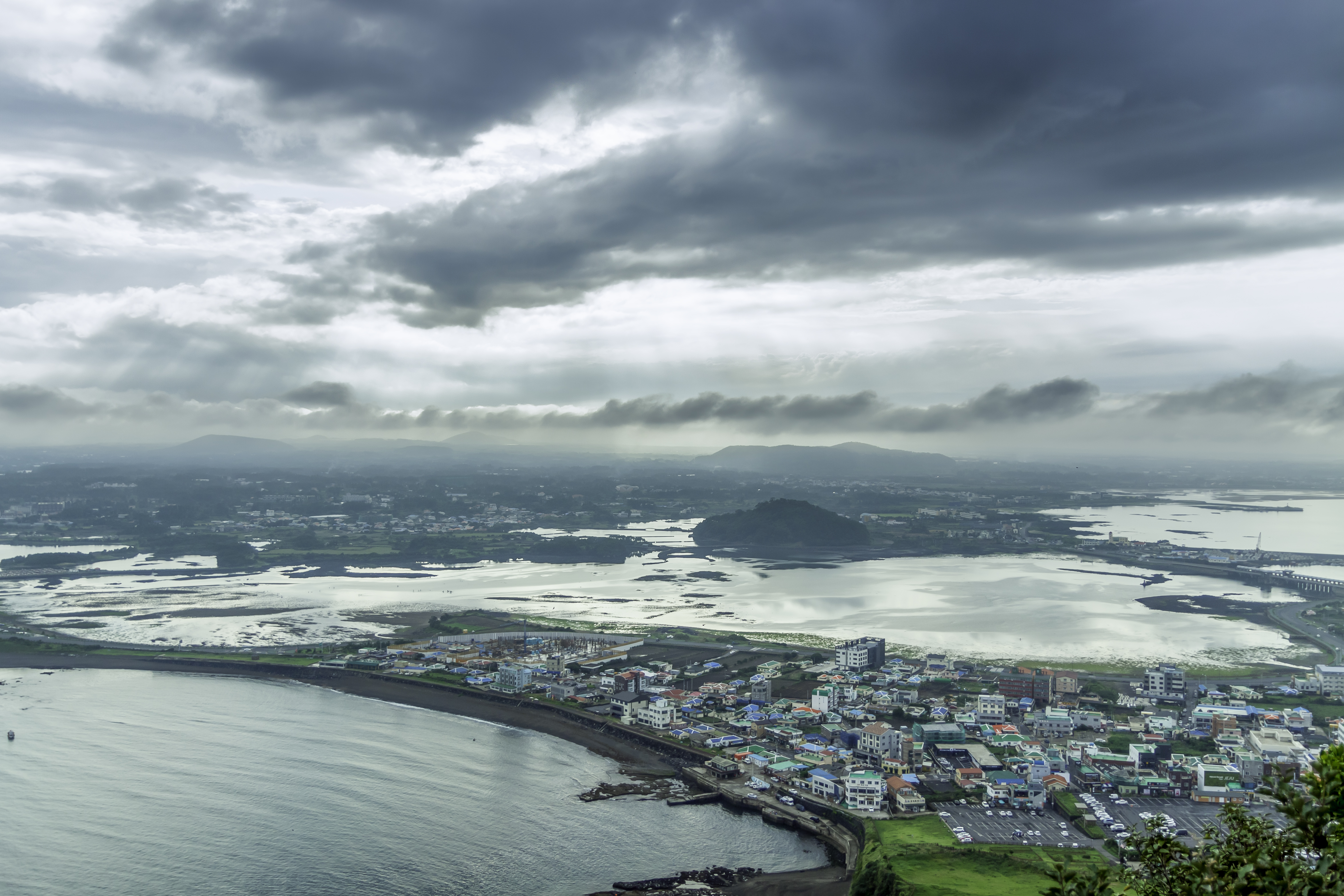
View from the mountain (2018)

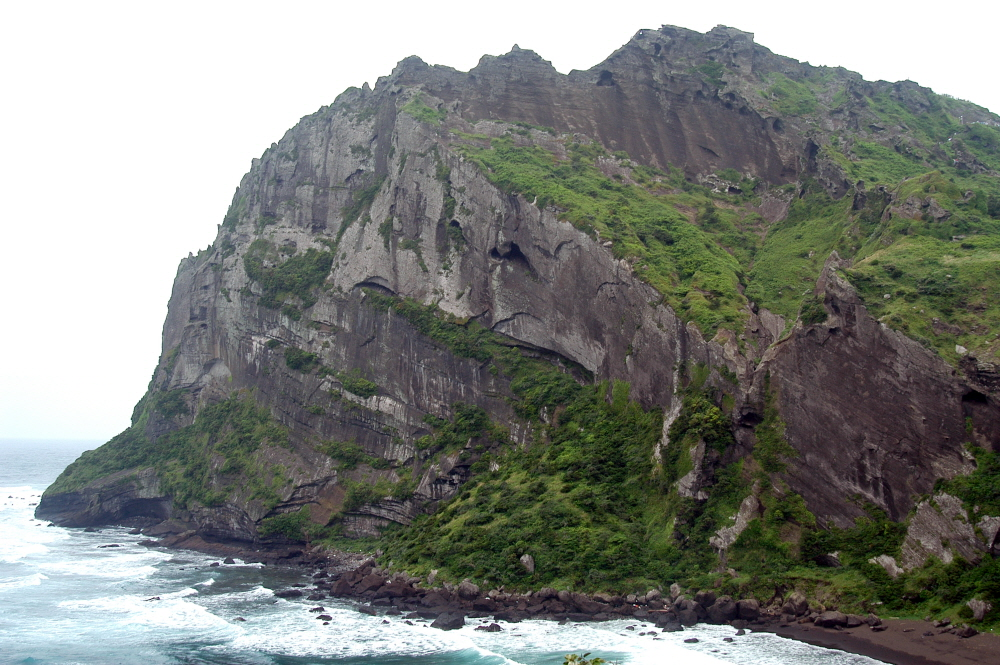
View of cliffs on the side of the mountain (2006)

== See also ==
- World Heritage Sites in South Korea
- Gimnyeonggul
- Geomunoreum Lava Tube System
- Manjanggul

== Additional reading ==
- Sohn, Y. K.; Cronin, S. J.; Brenna, M.; Smith, I. E. M.; Nemeth, K.; White, J. D. L.; Murtagh, R. M.; Jeon, Y. M.; Kwon, C. W. (2012-03-01). "Ilchulbong tuff cone, Jeju Island, Korea, revisited: A compound monogenetic volcano involving multiple magma pulses, shifting vents, and discrete eruptive phases". Geological Society of America Bulletin. 124 (3–4): 259–274. doi:10.1130/B30447.1. ISSN 0016-7606.
