= Gruta do Natal =

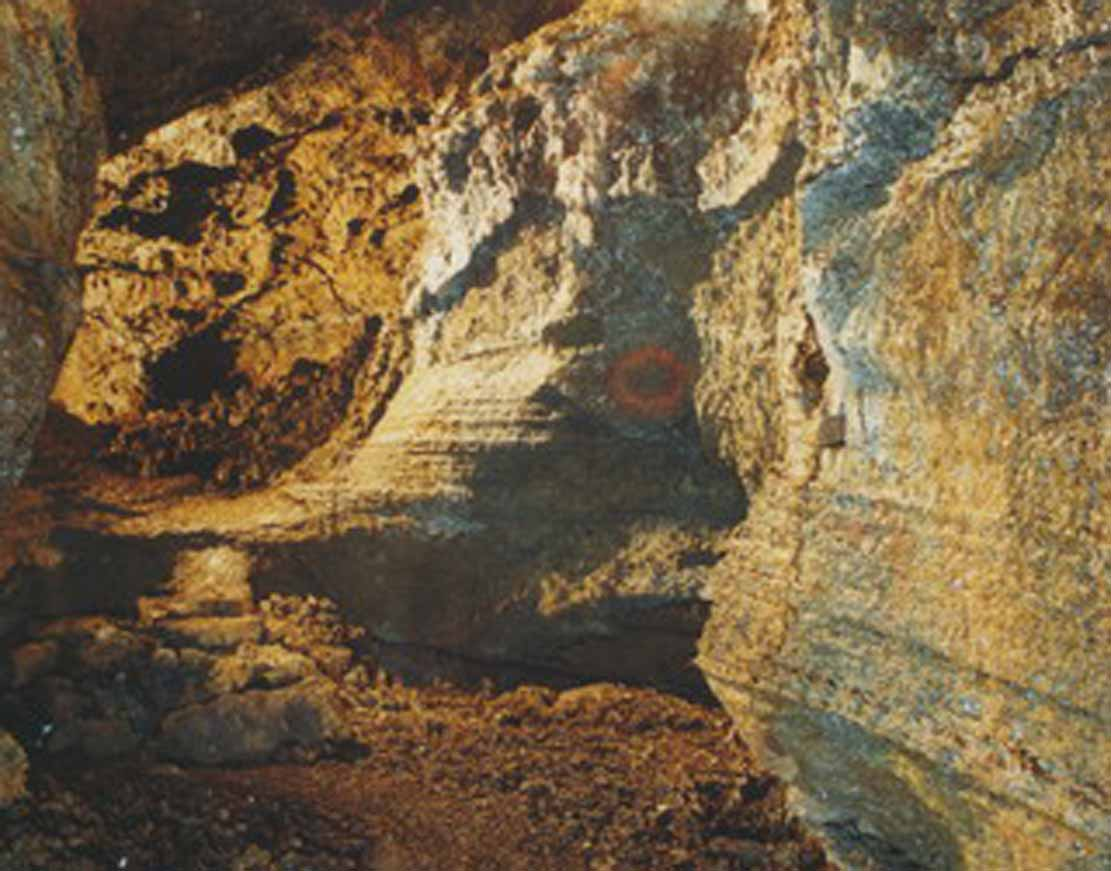
- A passage within the Gruta do Natal system
- Interactive map of Gruta do Natal
- Location: Terceira Island (Azores), Portugal
- Coordinates: 38°47′28″N 27°17′57″W
- Length: 697 metres (2,287 ft)
- Discovery: 1838
- Geology: Lava tube, Basalt
- Entrances: 1
- Access: Tours available in season

Gruta do Natal (Christmas Cave), also known as Galeria Negra or Gruta do Cavalo, is a cave system in municipality of Praia da Vitória, on the island of Terceira in the Portuguese archipelago of the Azores.

== History ==
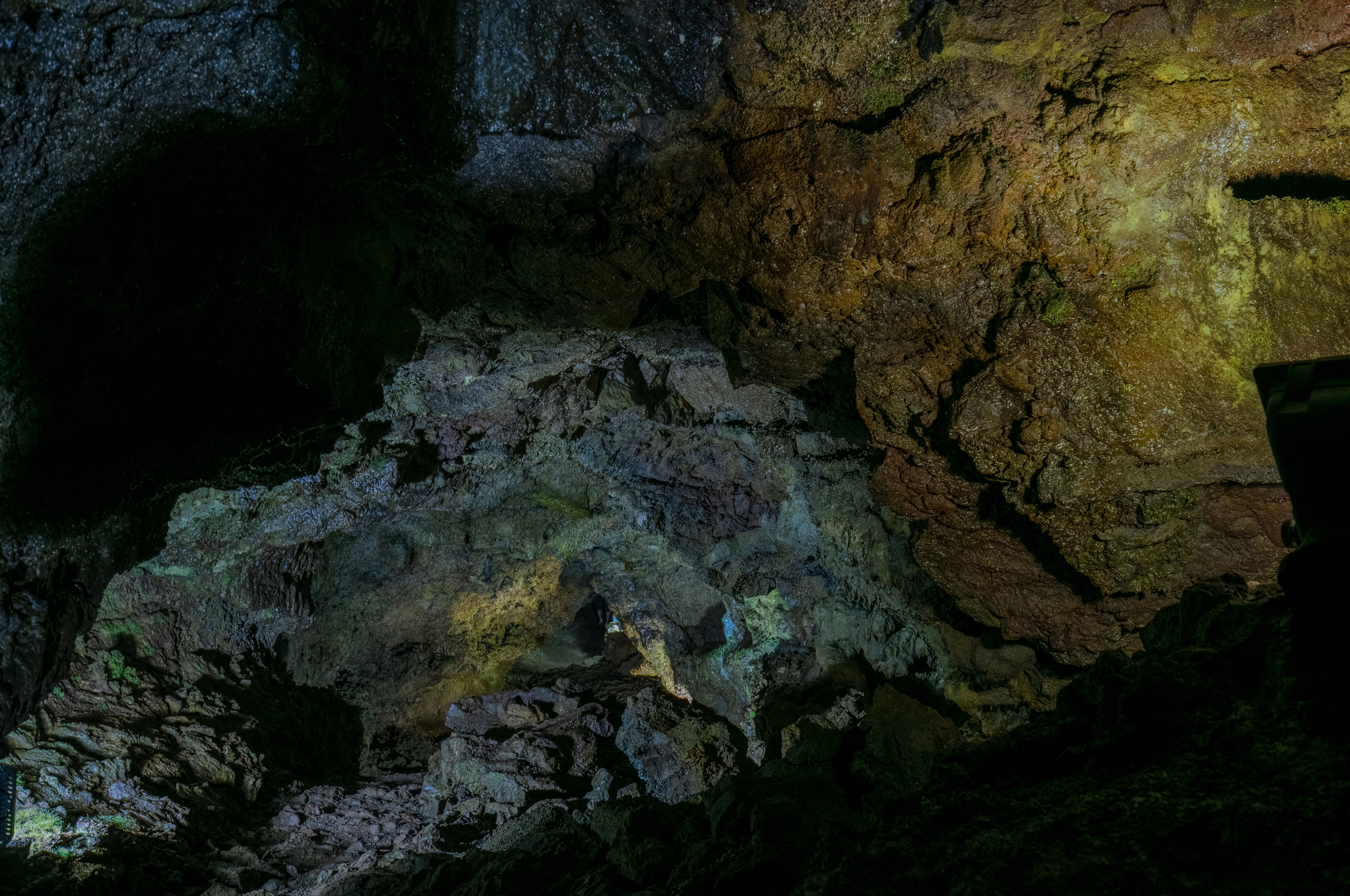

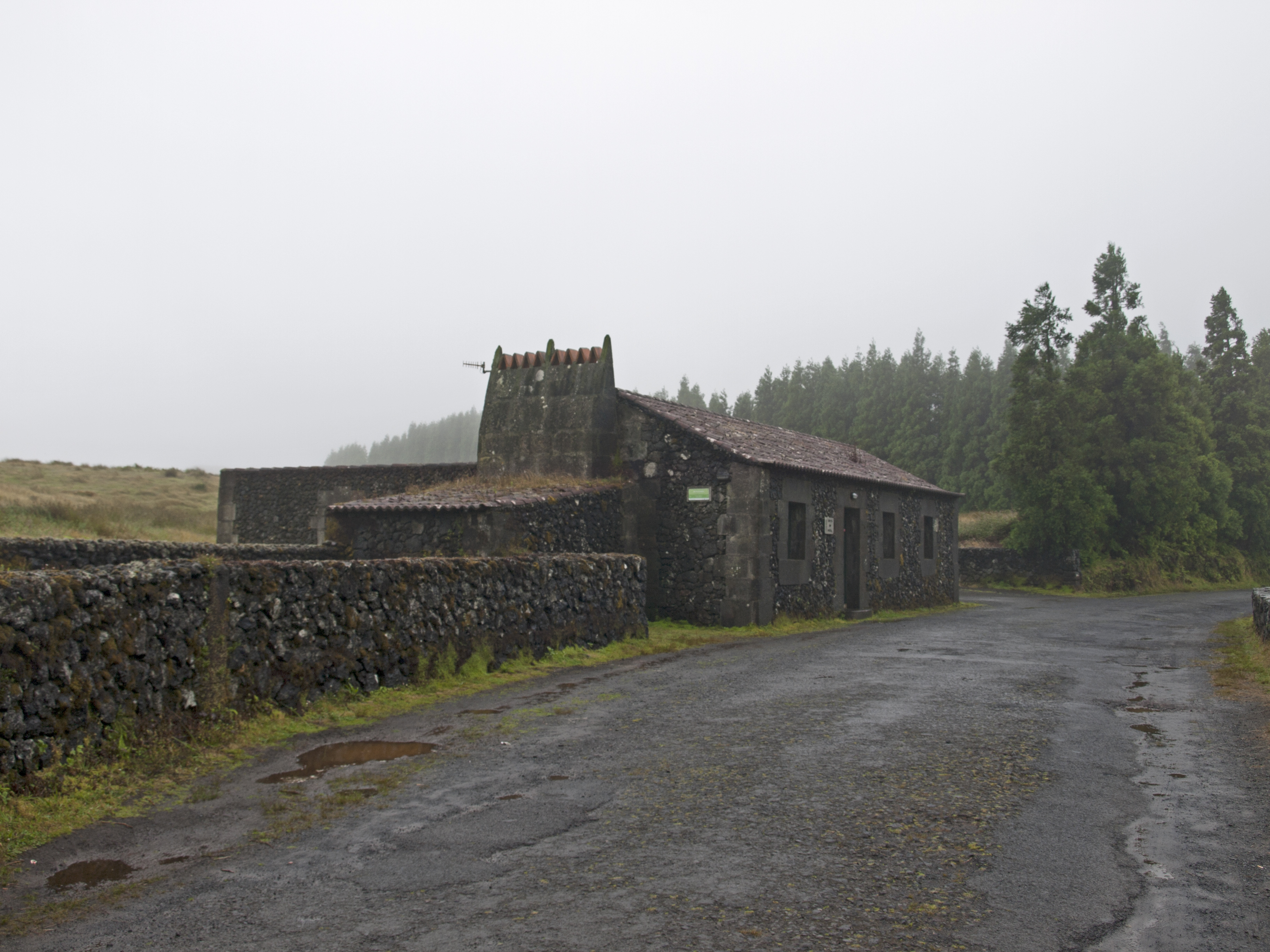
Entrance building

The caves formation is unclear. Its genesis can be explained by the ancient lava fields that developed from fissural vents, that flowed through the valley between the larger volcanic peaks.

Initially known as the Galeria Negra (Black Gallery), was baptised as the Gruta do Cavalo following the first exploratory investigation, when the explorers discovered the remains of a horse, which may have fallen at the entrance of the cave. Later, after 25 December 1969, with the assistance of the eastern patriarch, D. José Vieira Alvernaz, islanders began referring the cave as the Gruta do Natal. It was on this date that they opened the cave to the public, with a simple access-way and rudimentary lighting. Traditionally, a Christmas mass is held at the site, but there have also been baptisms and at least one marriage on the site.

The sites was the destination of various acts of vandalism, and today its access has been conditional.

The mountaineering group Os Montanheiros constructed a rustic house (typical of the hay-loft/barns) to support activities during the site's exploration. The simple structure was also the centre of vandal attacks and criminal activities over its history, resulting in its degradation. In 1989, the mountaineering group began a project to promote tourist activities at Gruta do Natal, with the construction of a new building, which was integrated into the surrounding landscape. This building was sued to shelter an electric generator, to provide permanent lighting within the cave; protect the site from vandalism; and provide an interpretative centre for visitors to the site. The building includes washrooms, a generator room, and an access-way and staircase to the cave. Inaugurated on 1 December 1998, the anniversary date of the mountaineering association, it was opened to the public on 1 June 1999.

The interior circuit was developed so that visitors would not follow the same trajectory coming and going along the route, while providing information about the histo-cultural traditions of this cave, in addition to the scientific and geological history. It is a pedagogic meeting-point used by professors and teachers to present the history of the formative forces that occur in the archipelago of the Azores. The site is open to the public from June to September, every day, throughout the afternoons, with special openings coordinated through the Montanheiros organization by appointment.

== Geography ==
The Gruta do Natal is located near the Picos Gordos, within the Reserva Florestal Natural da Serra de Santa Bárbara e Mistérios Negros (Santa Bárbara and Mistérios Negros Natural Forest Reserve), an humanized area encircled by pasture-lands and forest of Azorean juniper. With a privileged position, the site is located near a roadway and popular lake-front picnic area of Lagoa do Negro. The roadway is also an access-way for tourist routes; it is being one of the few caves in the Azores that is visibly identifiable, visible from major thoroughfares and publicly signalled. Of all the cave systems in the Azores, Gruta do Natal provides the best conditions for tourist exploration, along with the Algar do Carvão system.

It is a lava tube of 697 metres (2,287 ft) length, with easy access, high ceiling and floor with slight slope. The interior of the cave includes geological structures such as different examples of lava, estalcites and lateral protuberances.
