= Skylight Cave =

Cave in Oregon, United States

- Interactive map of Skylight Cave
- Location: Deschutes County, Oregon
- Coordinates: 44°20′55″N 121°42′57″W
- Length: 1017 feet (map length)
- Entrances: 1
- Difficulty: Easy
- Access: May 1st thru September 14th

Skylight Cave is a lava tube within Deschutes County, Oregon, in the United States. The cave is within Deschutes National Forest and is located east of Belknap Crater about nine miles northwest of the city of Sisters. Skylight Cave is closed to visitation from September 15 to April 30 because of hibernating Townsend's big-eared bats.

== Geology ==
The cave is entered via a steel ladder through a collapsed roof section. The most notable features of the cave are its three hornito skylights in the eastern passage, for which the cave is named. During the cave's formation, it may have had more hornitos suggested by the many small cupolas along its passage. The entrance may have been a hornito that collapsed. The eastern passage has mostly original morphology, but the western passage is filled with sand and clay and some piles of breakdown. The western passage is longer and more difficult to navigate.

== History ==
Skylight Cave is closed to visitation from September 15 to April 30 because of hibernating Townsend's big-eared bats. Many years worth of rotted ladders were once strewn around the entrance floor.
