= Fourni =

Fourni may refer to:

- Fourni Korseon, an archipelago in the Aegean Sea
- Phourni or Fourni, the archaeological site of an ancient Minoan cemetery in Crete

== See also ==
- Furni (disambiguation)
