= Cheese Cave =

Lava tube in Washington, United States

Coordinates: 45°59′16.6″N 121°33′1.5″W

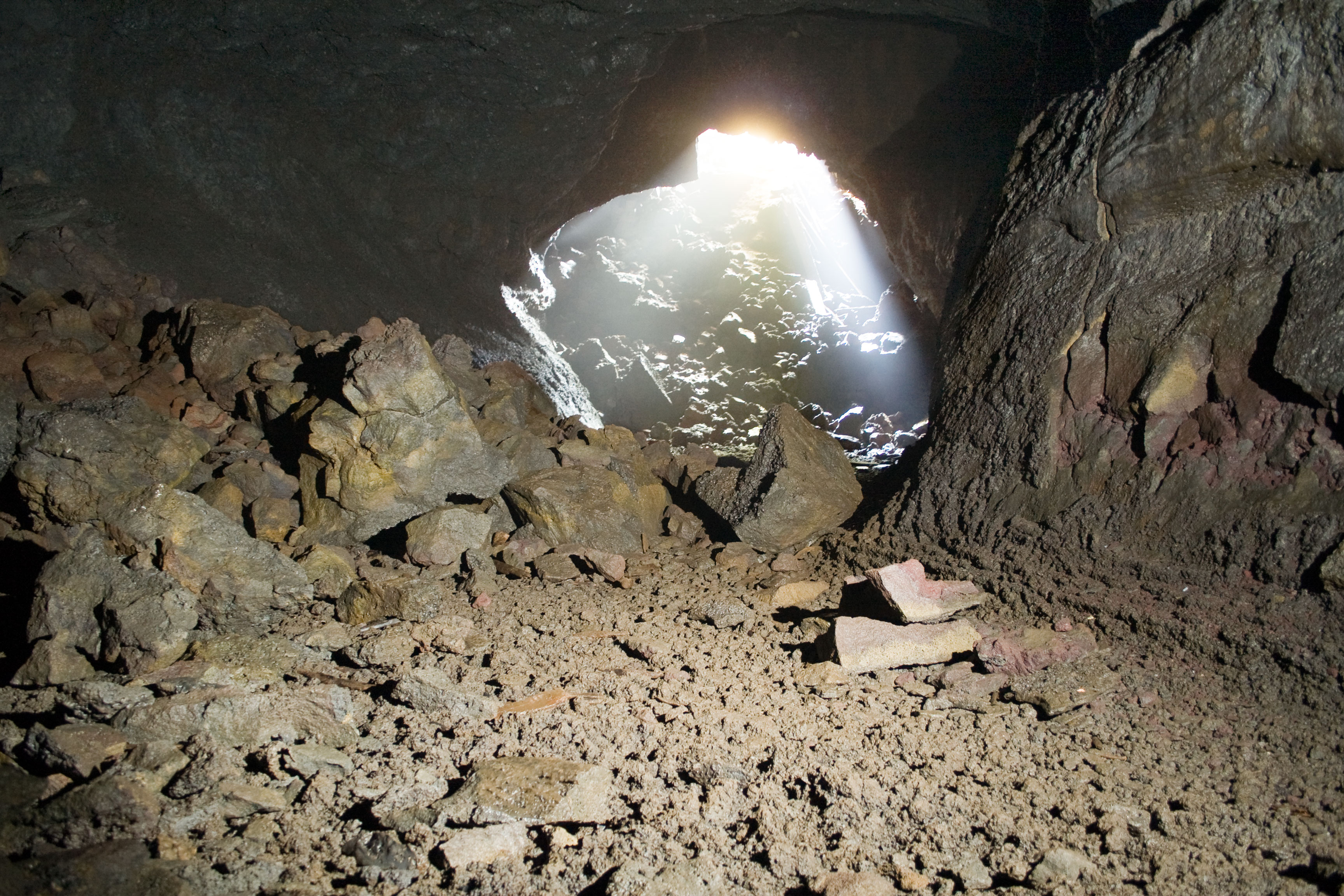
- Interactive map of Cheese Cave
- Location: Trout Lake, WA
- Length: 2,060 feet (628 m)
- Discovery: 1894
- Difficulty: easy
- Access: Public

Cheese Cave is a lava tube located in Gifford Pinchot National Forest just southwest of Trout Lake, Washington. It is approximately 2,060 feet (628 m) in length, with a mostly flat floor 25 feet (8 m) wide and a 45 feet (14 m) to 60 feet (18 m) high ceiling.

Official reports cite the cave as being discovered in 1894 by Joseph Aerni, a local resident. The cave was first used for storing potatoes and, later, cheese. Homer Spencer established the Guler Cheese Co., which used the cave's constant 42 °F (6 °C) to 44 °F (7 °C) passage to age its cheese. The cheese company is now gone, but remnants of storage racks remain toward the north end of the cave.

Cheese Cave's natural entrance is located 246 feet (75 m) from the north end of the tube. The north cave entrance is in private property and has a building over the sinkhole. There is a steel staircase from the inside of the private building down to a small rock pile on the cave floor.

Toward the north end of the cave, remnants of wooden racks can be seen.

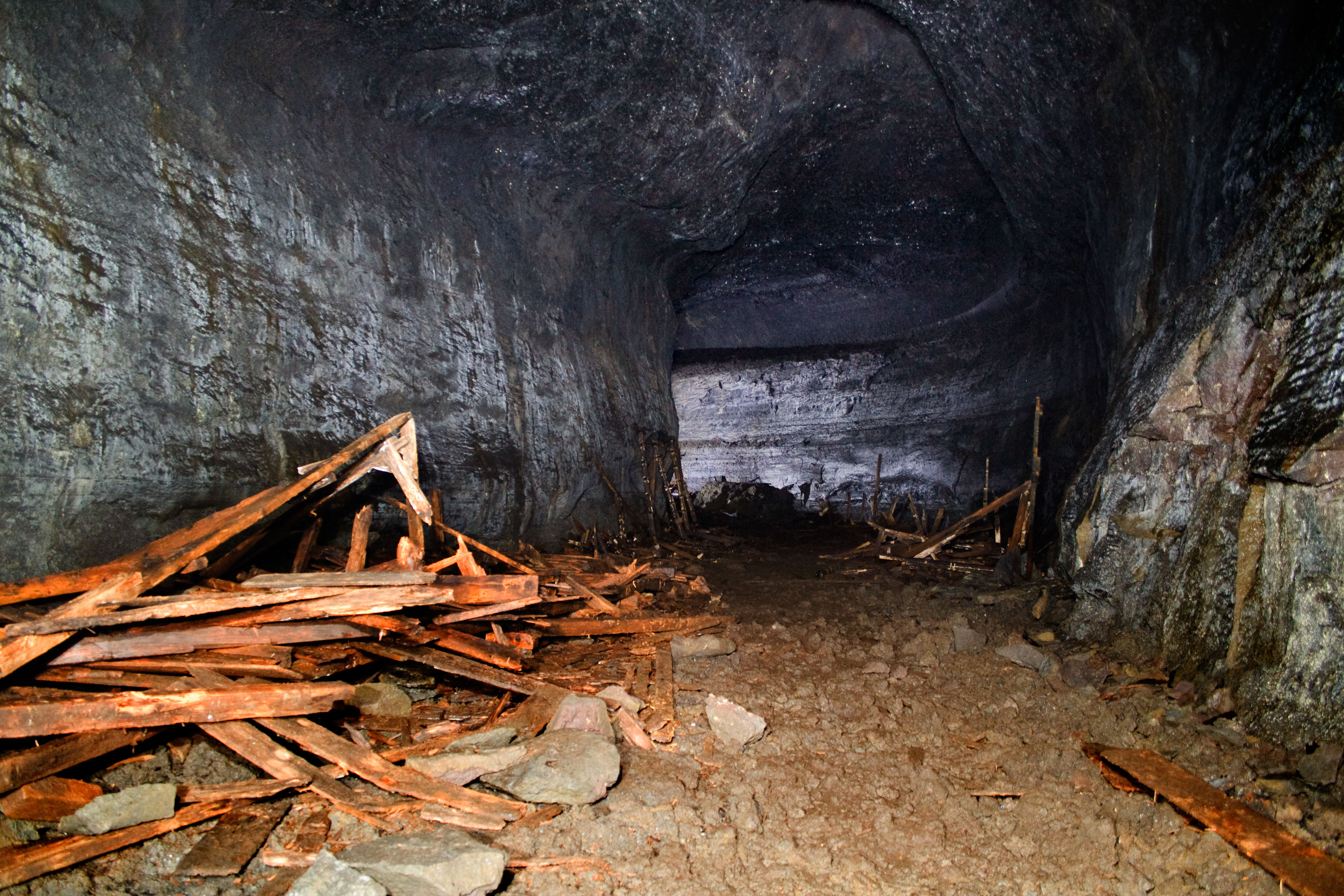

The man-made south entrance is covered by a low pavilion structure and has a permanently placed ladder descending to a debris pile. The debris pile can be descended on foot, landing on a flat and clear cinder floor. The main length of the cave is mostly clear with occasional piles of fallen rock.
