= Niter Ice Cave =

Ice cave in Idaho, US

Coordinates: 42°32′00″N 111°43′58″W

The Niter Ice Cave is a geological feature approximately 3 miles south of the small southeastern Idaho town of Grace, Idaho.

== History ==
The most probable explanation for the Niter Ice Cave is that thousands of years ago, a volcanic eruption formed a huge lava tube that eventually cooled to form this cave. Early settlers in the area found the cave to be a place to store their food and collect ice all year around. It has been a picnic spot and recreation site. There have been explicit drawings and graffiti on, around, and in the ice cave.
