= Gruta das Mercês =

The Gruta das Mercês (identified as Gruta das Mercês I by geologists) is a cave located along the Canada das Mercês, situated in the civil parish of Feteira, municipality of Angra do Heroísmo, in the Portuguese archipelago of the Azores.

The cavern was created by volcanic forces that generated a lava tube, along a series of lava flows near the coast. It is approximately 69 metres (226 ft) long, 4.7 metres (15 ft) tall and 3.9 metres (13 ft) wide.
