= Gruta do Carvão =

Geological feature in the Azores

- Monumento Natural Regional da Gruta do Carvão; Regional Natural Monument of Gruta do Carvão
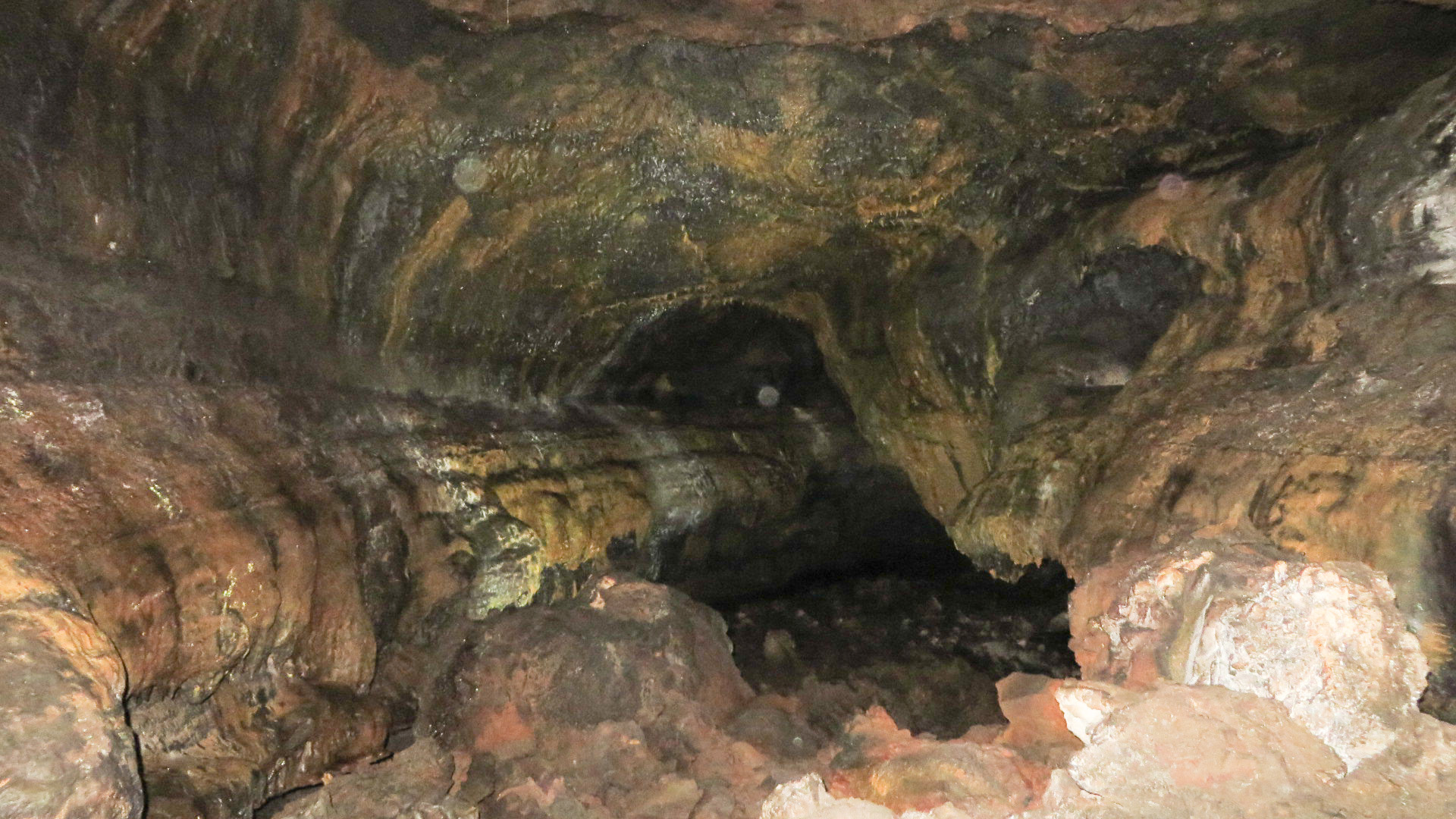
- A view of the visit area of the Gruta do Carvão
- Interactive map of Gruta do Carvão
- Location: São Miguel (Azores), Portugal
- Coordinates: 37°44′53.4″N 25°41′13.4″W
- Length: 1,650 metres (5,410 ft)
- Height variation: 6.4 metres (21 ft)
- Geology: Lava tube, Basalt
- Entrances: 1
- Entrances list: Rua do Paim
- Access: Tours are available in season
- Features: Stalactites, Stalagmites

The Gruta do Carvão (Grotto of Coal) is an ancient lava tube located on the outskirts of the municipality of Ponta Delgada (in the civil parish of Santa Clara) on the island of São Miguel in the Portuguese archipelago of the Azores.

== History ==
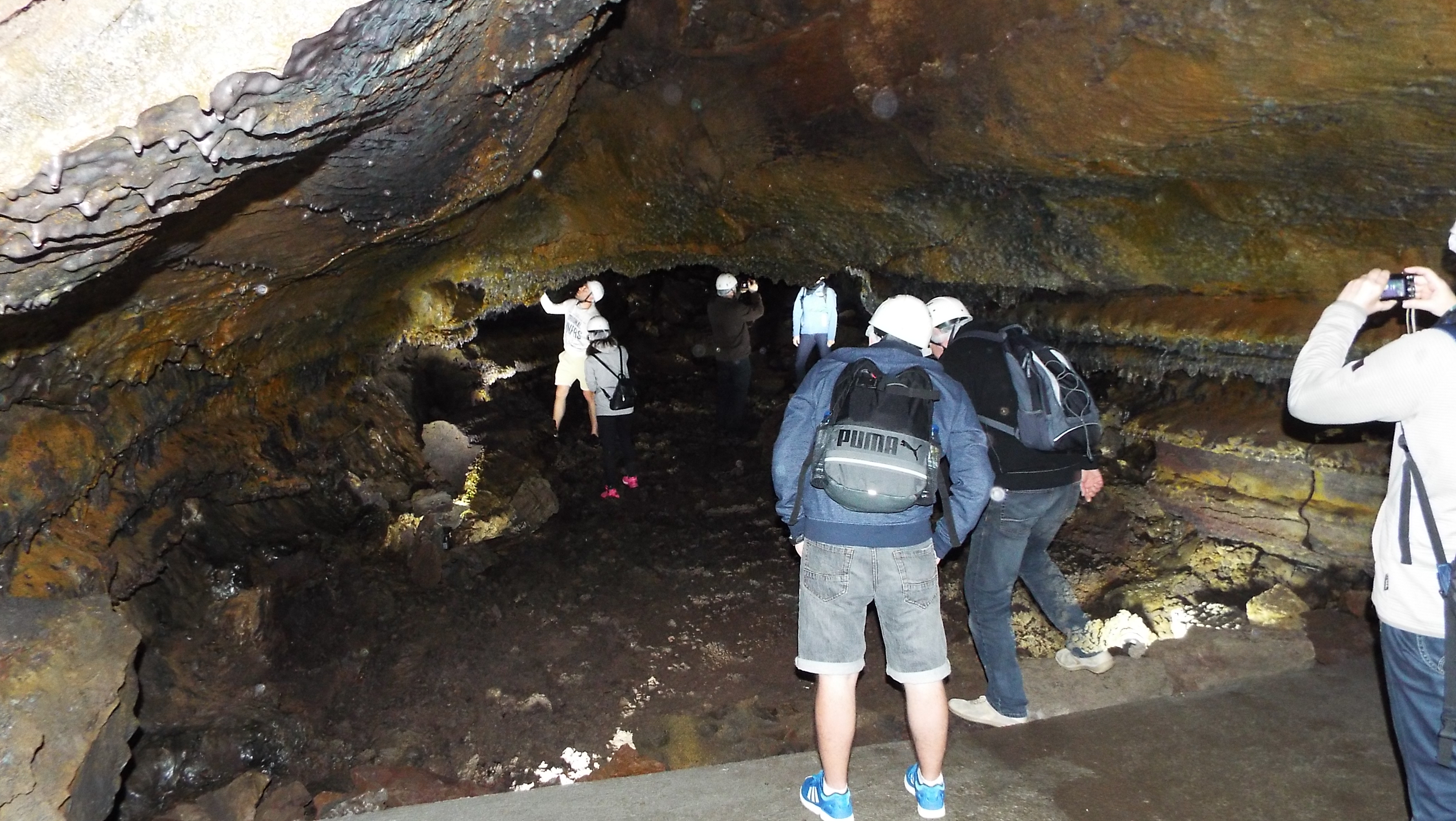
Visitors within the accessible area of the grotto

Gaspar Frutuoso, the 16th century chronicler and historian wrote:

"Afar, a short way from the Fortress, going west, is a place called Ponta dos Algares, because there are two grottos with their opening, inside which there is a large underground path where rivers of lava seeming to have run in ancient times, not known nor seen."

Owing to its scientific, educational and touristic relevance, as well as its natural characteristics, the Gruta do Carvão was classified as a Regional natural Monument by Regional Decree 4/2005/A on 11 May 2005.

== Geography ==
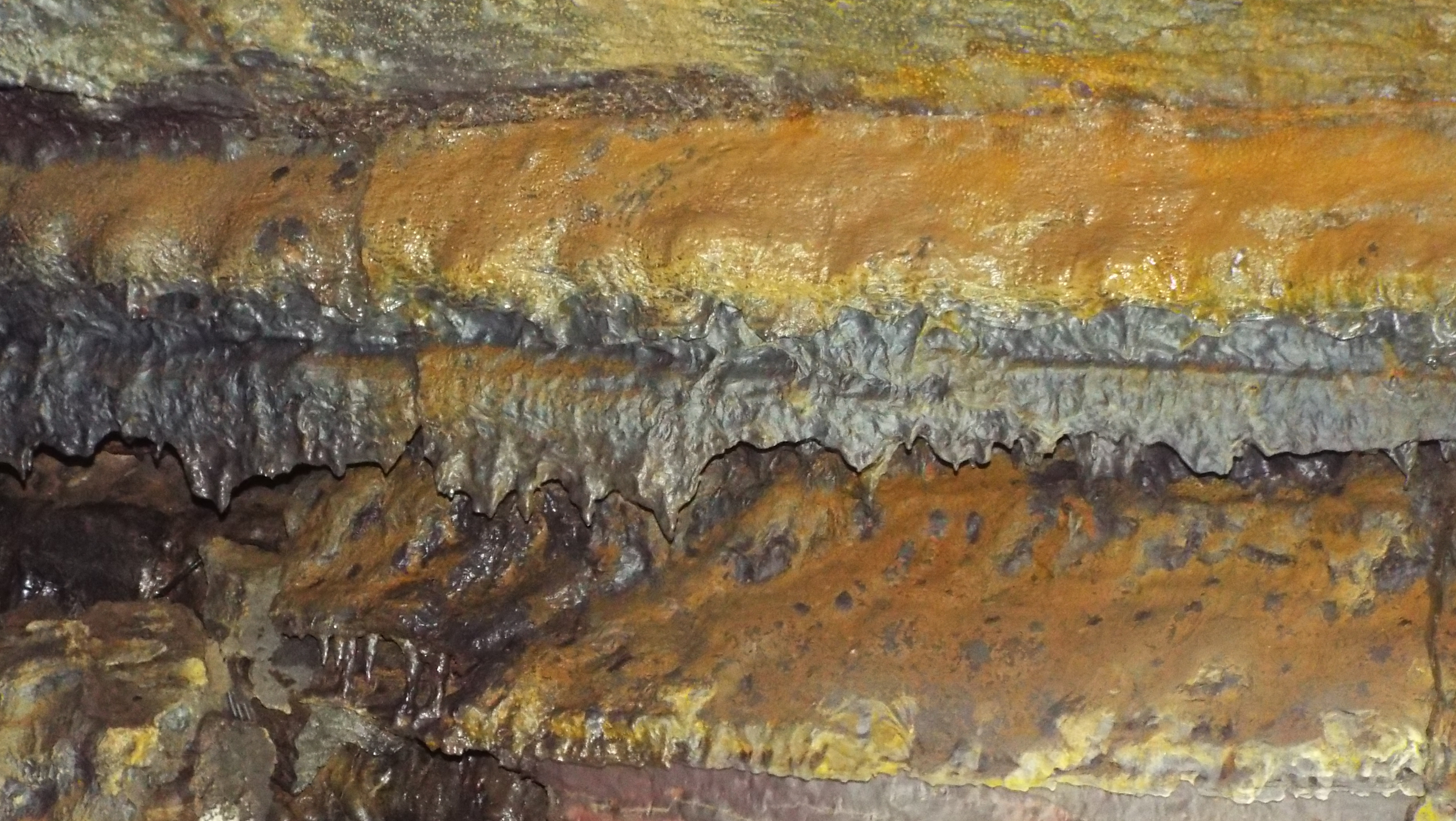
The lateral walls of the grotto

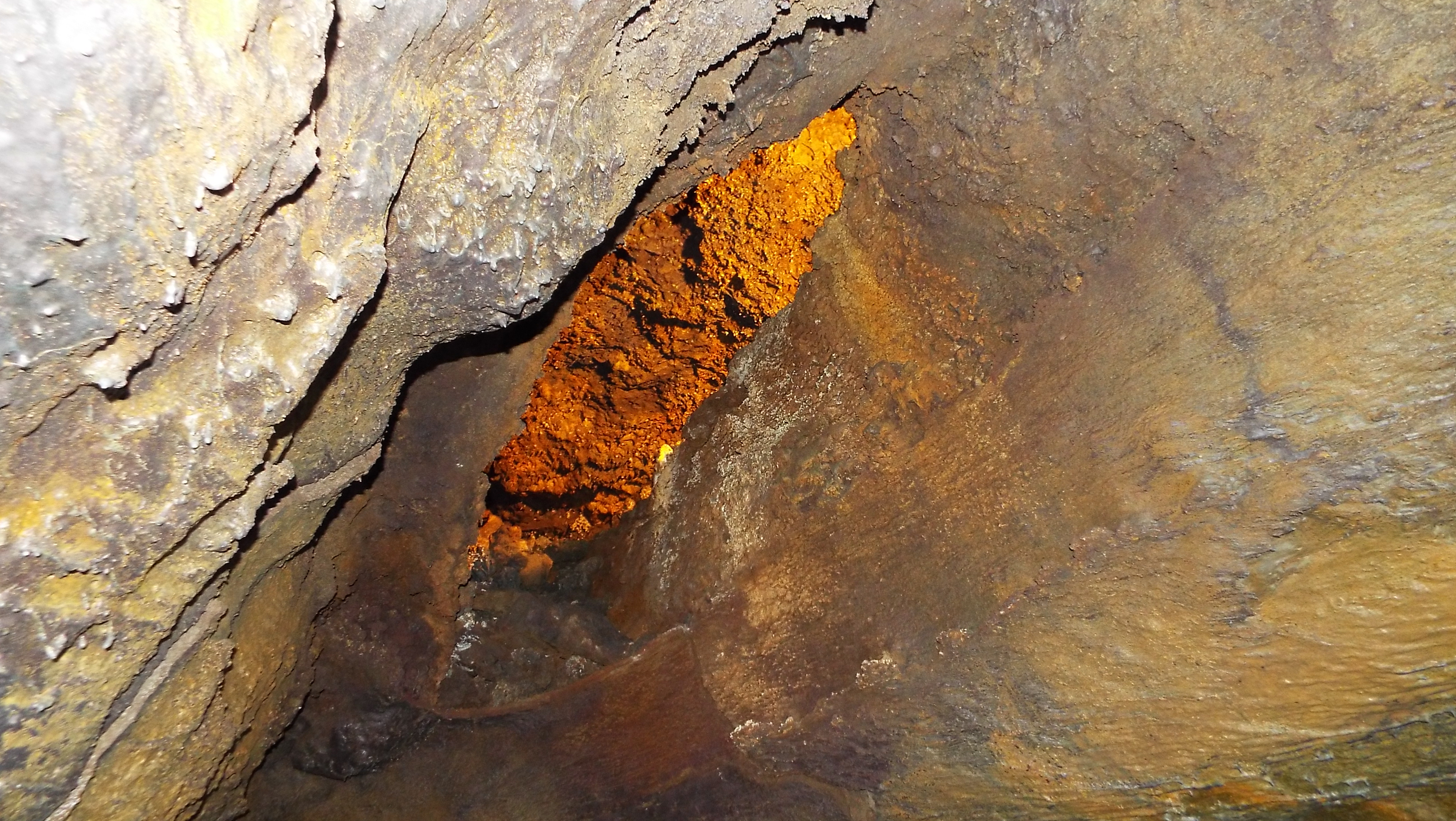
Brownish stalagmites on the ceiling of the cave

The Gruta is situated in the parish of Santa Clara, in the northwest part of Ponta Delgada and is integrated into the Monumento Natural Regional da Gruta do Carvão (Regional Natural Monument of Gruta do Carvão), to the northwest of water reservoirs of SMAS, along Rua do Paim.

The largest lava tunnel on the island of São Miguel, the cave is located in the western edge of Ponta Delgada and extends for 1,650 metres (5,410 ft). It is divided into three sections: Rua de Lisboa (or Secadores de Tabaco), Rua do Paim and Rua João do Rego. Yet, older documents and field work suggest that the tube actually longer, and may reach a length of 5 kilometres (3.1 mi). The section at Rua do Paim is approximately 557 metres (1,827 ft) long, with an internal cavity that is at its maximum extent 6.4 metres (21 ft) high and 8 metres (26 ft) wide.

Along the cavern walls are speleological structures such as lateral benches, lava bridges, branching galleries, lava balls, stalactites, stalagmites, columns, spongy lavas, glaze and tree moulds. Apart from several cracks, the walls and ceiling are multi-coloured (orange to yellowish) due to the basalt oxidization. There are also conical-shaped stalactites, secondary mineral deposits of silica and earthen deposits covering the walls and ceiling. Many of the stalagmites are 25 centimetres (9.8 in) long with long sections of superimposed, soda-straw, conical ring-type tubes with pitted pockets.

== See also ==
- Protected areas of the Azores
