= Galerias da Feteira =

- Location: Terceira Island (Azores), Portugal
- Length: 100 metres (330 ft)
- Geology: Lava tube, Basalt
- Entrances: 1

The Galerias da Feteira (literally the Galleries of Feteira) is a geological feature in the civil parish of Feteira in the municipality of Angra do Heroísmo, on the Portuguese island of Terceira Island in the archipelago of the Azores.

The Galerias are lava tubes, located between Pico Geraldes, Pico do Magina and Pico da Vima, that consist of a series of 100 metres (330 ft) tunnel/caves carved from molten lava that cooled.
