= Furna de Água =

- Interactive map of Furna de Água
- Location: Terceira Island (Azores), Portugal
- Coordinates: 38.7087749°N 27.1724746°W
- Depth: 90 metres (300 ft)
- Length: 100 metres (330 ft)
- Discovery: 1838
- Geology: Lava tube, Basalt
- Entrances: 1
- Access: Tours are available in season

Furna de Água is a cave system located in the municipality of Angra do Heroísmo, on the island of Terceira in the Portuguese archipelago of the Azores. The 560 metres (1,840 ft) long volcanic lava tube, is one of the main sources of fresh water on the island, due to the presence of several springs within the cave. Although known since 1838 (and perhaps earlier), Furna de Água only began to be prospected and used in the mid-20th century.

== History ==
Its name originated from the existence of an abundance of springs in its interior, many of which became known since 1838. At that time, the famed Terceirense historian Francisco Ferreira Drummond was local representative in Vila de São Sebastião, and he investigated the stories about the Furna do Cabrito and Furna d'Água in order to provide fresh potable water to the region. At that time, it was decided that Furna do Cabrito would be a source of water, but not the Furna d'Água, since it would be difficult to capture the waters of this spring.

In 1867, Frank Fouqué, on a visit to Terceira to study the submarine eruptions on Serreta, wrote of a lava tunnel at the entrance to the Guilherme Moniz caldera, referring to it as one of the more beautiful that he had visited. From his description, it is likely that he was referring to Furna d'Água.

The municipal council of Angra do Heroîsmo, considered the possibility of tapping the waters of the Furna de Água in 1945, but this project never advanced.

It was only on 1 September 1953, under the initiative of the General Junta, that the first public works to capture the spring water of Furna d'Água were initiated, along with improvements to the collection of waters from the spring at Furna do Cabrito. Waters from the site, not only supported public consumption, but were used to feed the hydroelectric generating points at Nasce Água, São João de Deus and the Duke of Terceira Garden (and even today function when necessary). It is the municipal service department of Angra do Heroísmo which continues to maintain and explore both caves, and the water used primarily to support public consumption. These two caves represent the largest sources of freshwater on the island of Terceira.

== Geography ==
Furna d'Água is situada on the western edge of the Guilherme Moniz caldera, between Pico Espigão Barreiro and Pico da Cruz, and runs under the roadway that connects the regional Via Rápida Angra-Cabo da Praia to Cabrito. Its access and entryways are located near the artificial lake situated near Cabrito, about 1,300 metres (4,300 ft) from the intersection with the regional expressway.

The cave is 560 metres (1,840 ft), including those tunnels expanded by human intervention; it is estimated that the original length of the cave system covered 458 metres (1,503 ft). There are three branches to the system. The main is 97 metres (318 ft), while the remaining 37 metres (121 ft) were artificial extended to form the actual visitors entrance to the cave system. The two remaining branches are 28 metres (92 ft) and 54 metres (177 ft) respectively. The space within the cave extends from .5 metres (1.6 ft) to 9.5 metres (31 ft), with the maximum height 9 metres (30 ft).

The cave formed from lava that flowed from the Guilherme Moniz caldera in the direction of the area around Feteira. It is estimated that this occurred approximately 2000 years ago. The hollow tube developed from the receding of magma and the strangulation of lava flow, corresponding to an area at the beginning of the cave, which separated this cave from Gruta dos Ratos. Even following public works to make the site suitable for visitors, there are several observable signs of lava flows, estalacites debris, lava do tipo "pão de milho" (in the last chamber) and lava aa (in the central floor of the cave). During the course of preparing the site, parts of the cave were destroyed with explosives, resulting in the destruction of lateral walls, ceiling and original floor, to allow the transport of water from its interior.
