= Geomunoreum Lava Tube System =

Lava tubes in Jeju Province, South Korea

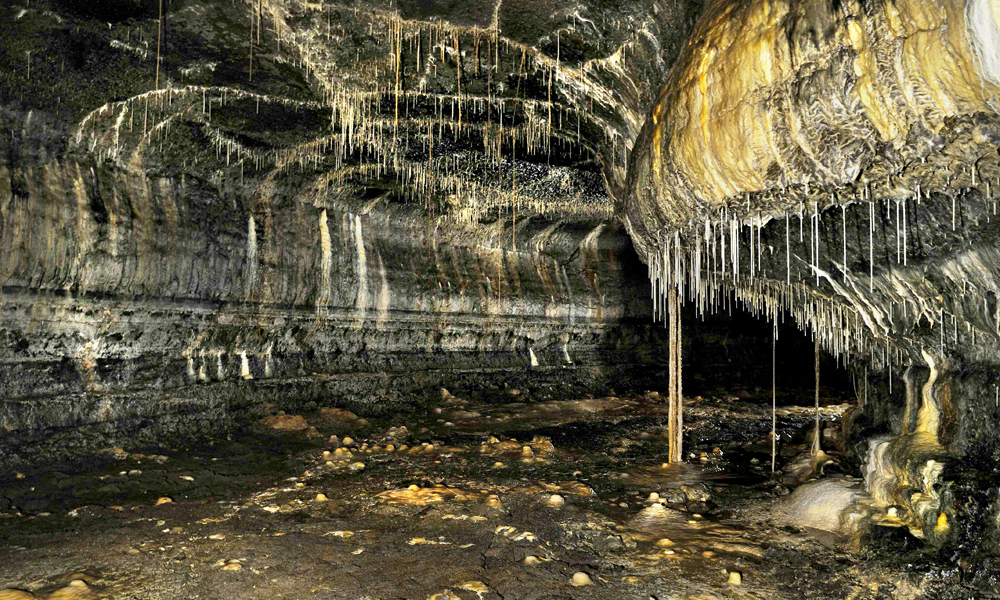
- Part of the cave system (2007)
- Interactive map of Geomunoreum Lava Tube System
- Coordinates: 33°31′30″N 126°46′21″E

UNESCO World Heritage Site
- Designated: 2007
- Part of: Jeju Volcanic Island and Lava Tubes
- Reference no.: 1264
- Geomunoreum Lava Tube System
- Hangul: 거문오름 용암동굴계
- Hanja: 거문오름 鎔巖洞窟系
- Revised Romanization: Geomuneoreum Yongamdonggulgye
- McCune–Reischauer: Kŏmunŏrŭm Yongamdonggulgye

The Geomunoreum Lava Tube System (Korean: 거문오름 용암동굴계) is located between Seonheul-ri, Jocheon-eup and Weoljeong-ri, Gujwa-eup, Jeju City, Jeju Province, South Korea. This lava tube system refers to a series of lava tubes formed by multiple ancient eruptions of basaltic lava flow from the Geomunoreum volcano (elevation 456 m). The flows followed a north-northeast direction for about 13 km, going down to the coastline. It is estimated that the tube system formed between about 100 and 300 thousand years ago.

Lava tubes so far included in the Geomunoreum Lava Tube System are the Seonheul Vertical Cave, Bengdwigul Lava Tube, Bukoreumdonggul Lava Tube, Daerimdonggul Lava Tube, Mangjanggul Lava Tube, Gimnyeonggul Lava Tube, Yongcheondonggul Lava Tube, and Dangcheomuldonggul Lava Tube towards the sea. However, it is estimated that more tubes will be found. Bukoreumdonggul Lava Tube, Mangjanggul Lava Tube and Dangcheomuldonggul Lava are designated as natural monuments. Although these lava tubes are extremely large and ancient, the internal morphological features are well-preserved and the inner scenery is considered to be outstanding. As a result, "Jeju Volcanic Island and Lava Tubes" are UNESCO World Natural Heritage Sites. Study results about the Geomunoreum Lava Tube System have been published in academic journals.

== See also ==
- World Heritage Sites in South Korea
- Jeju Volcanic Island and Lava Tubes
- Seongsan Ilchulbong
- Hallasan
- Jeju Province
