= Furni =

Furni may refer to:

- Furni, Tunisia, a Roman era civitas of the Roman province of Africa Proconsularis
- Furnos Maior and Furnos Minor, ancient Roman towns and bishoprics in modern-day Tunisia

== See also ==
- Fourni (disambiguation)
