= Jeju Volcanic Island and Lava Tubes =

UNESCO World Heritage Site in South Korea

UNESCO World Heritage Site
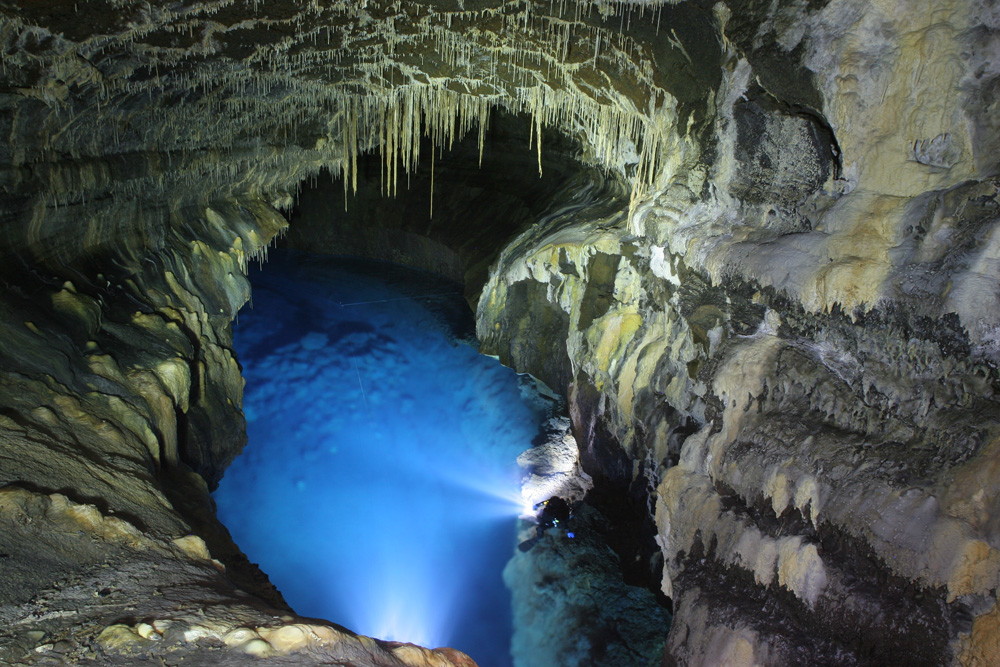
- The Millennium Lake in Yongcheon Cave (2009)

- Location within South Korea
- Location: Jeju Island, South Korea
- Includes: Hallasan Natural Reserve; Geomunoreum Lava Tube System; 1; 2; 3; Seongsan Ilchulbong Tuff Cone
- Criteria: Natural: (vii), (viii)
- Reference: 1264
- Inscription: 2007 (31st Session)
- Area: 9,475.2 ha (23,414 acres)
- Buffer zone: 9,370.8 ha (23,156 acres)
- Coordinates: 33°28′8″N 126°43′13″E

Korean name
- Hangul: 제주도 자연유산지구
- Hanja: 濟州島 自然遺産地區
- Revised Romanization: Jejudo jayeonyusanjigu
- McCune–Reischauer: Chejudo chayŏnyusanjigu

The Jeju Volcanic Island and Lava Tubes (Korean: 제주 화산섬과 용암 동굴) is a World Heritage Site in Jeju Province, South Korea. It was inscribed as one of the UNESCO World Heritage Sites in 2007 because of the Geomunoreum Lava Tube System and the exhibition of diverse and accessible volcanic features which are considered to demonstrate a distinctive and valuable contribution to the understanding of global volcanism.

Jeju is a volcanic island 130 kilometers from the southern coast of the Korean Peninsula. The largest island and smallest province in South Korea, the island has a surface area of 1,846 square kilometers.

== Formations ==
A central feature of Jeju is Hallasan, the tallest mountain in South Korea and a dormant volcano, which rises 1,950 meters above sea level. The main volcano includes 360 satellite volcanoes. Volcanic activity on Jeju began approximately in the Cretaceous and lasted until the early Paleogene period. The most recent eruptions are estimated to be about 5,000 years ago, which puts the volcano into the active classification, meaning eruptions in the last 10,000 years. The designation as active is not agreed by all, as more monitoring and study are needed to better understand the volcano.

According to UNESCO, the Geomunoreum Lava Tube System is regarded as the finest lava tube cave system in the world. It has a significant series of stalactites and other mineral formations that are considered visually impressive.

== Mt. Halla National Park ==
Hallasan is located in the central part of the island. Since 1966, any area 800 meters above sea level has been designated as a nature reserve. The park is mostly unspoilt nature with hiking paths and park managerial facilities being the only man-made modifications in the area.

The flora at the Mt. Halla National Park is unique. 1,565 vascular plant species have been recorded in the area thus far and is the highest number of plants in any mountain, 33 which are endemic to the island. Unlike most other Korean mountain environments, Hallsan has a unique vertical distribution of plants in three different zones: the subtropic, temperate, and frigid zones.

Over 17 mammals, 198 types of birds, 8 types of amphibians, 8 types of reptiles, and 947 insect species have been catalogued in the nature reserve. Endangered species include the Capreolus capreolus pygargus and Felis bengalensis manchuria, and a resident population of Indo-Pacific bottlenose dolphins and finless porpoises. Historically, the island and adjacent waters had been migration colliders and resting areas for large whales such as western gray whales, North Pacific right whales, humpback whales, blue whales and fin whales. Now possibly extinct Japanese sea lions might have colonized on the island as well. Some pinnipeds still occur occasionally. Since the island was last connected to the Korean Peninsula 10,000 years ago, animals endemic to the island appeared at that time and this separation from the mainland is also of biological significance.

A famous part of the Mt. Halla Nature Reserve is the Pillemot Cave, a site dating to the Paleolithic period. The caves are significant because of the archaeological remains found there. Archaeological evidence from the cave suggests that people have occupied the island since the Paleolithic period.

== See also ==
- World Heritage Sites in South Korea
- UNESCO World Heritage Site
