= Lava tube =

Natural conduit through which lava flows beneath the solid surface

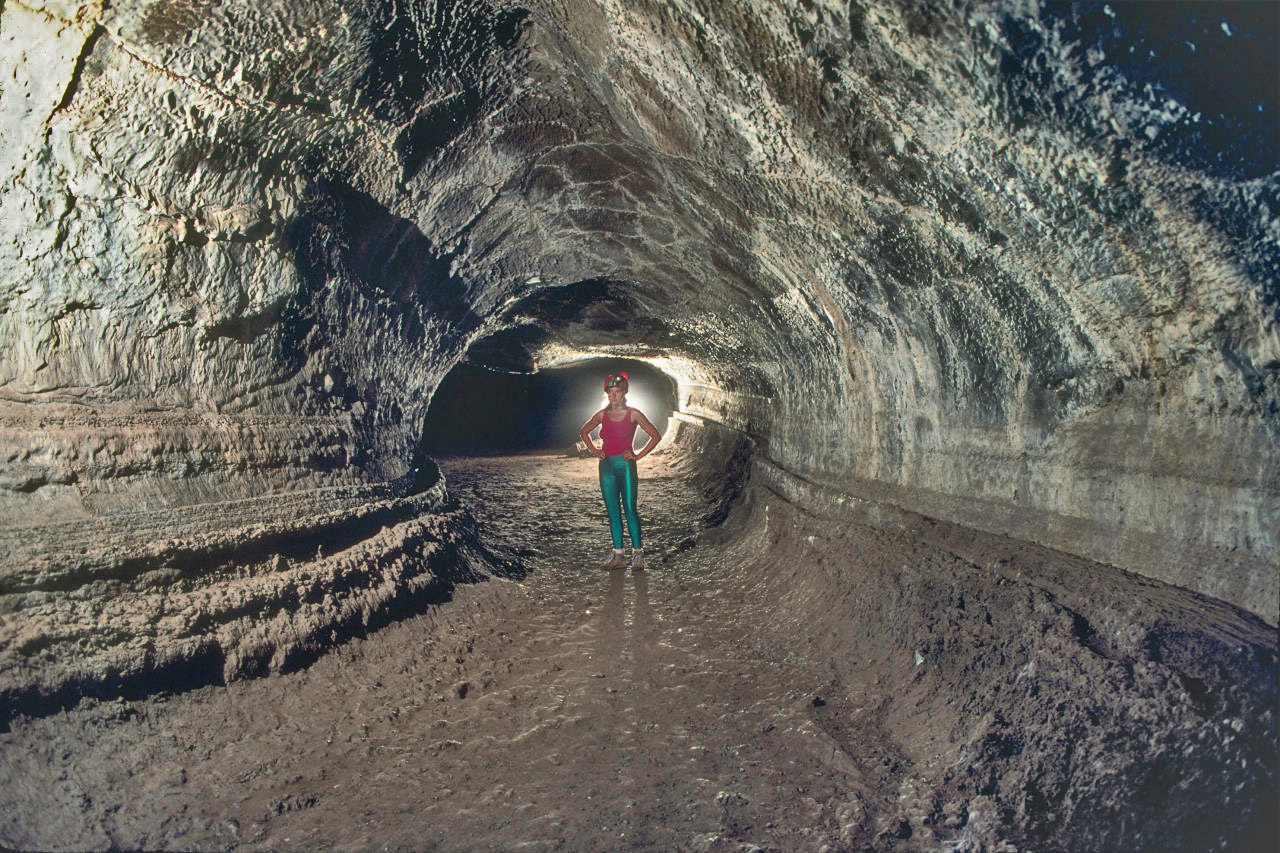
Valentine Cave, a lava tube in Lava Beds National Monument, California shows the classic tube shape; the grooves on the wall mark former flow levels.

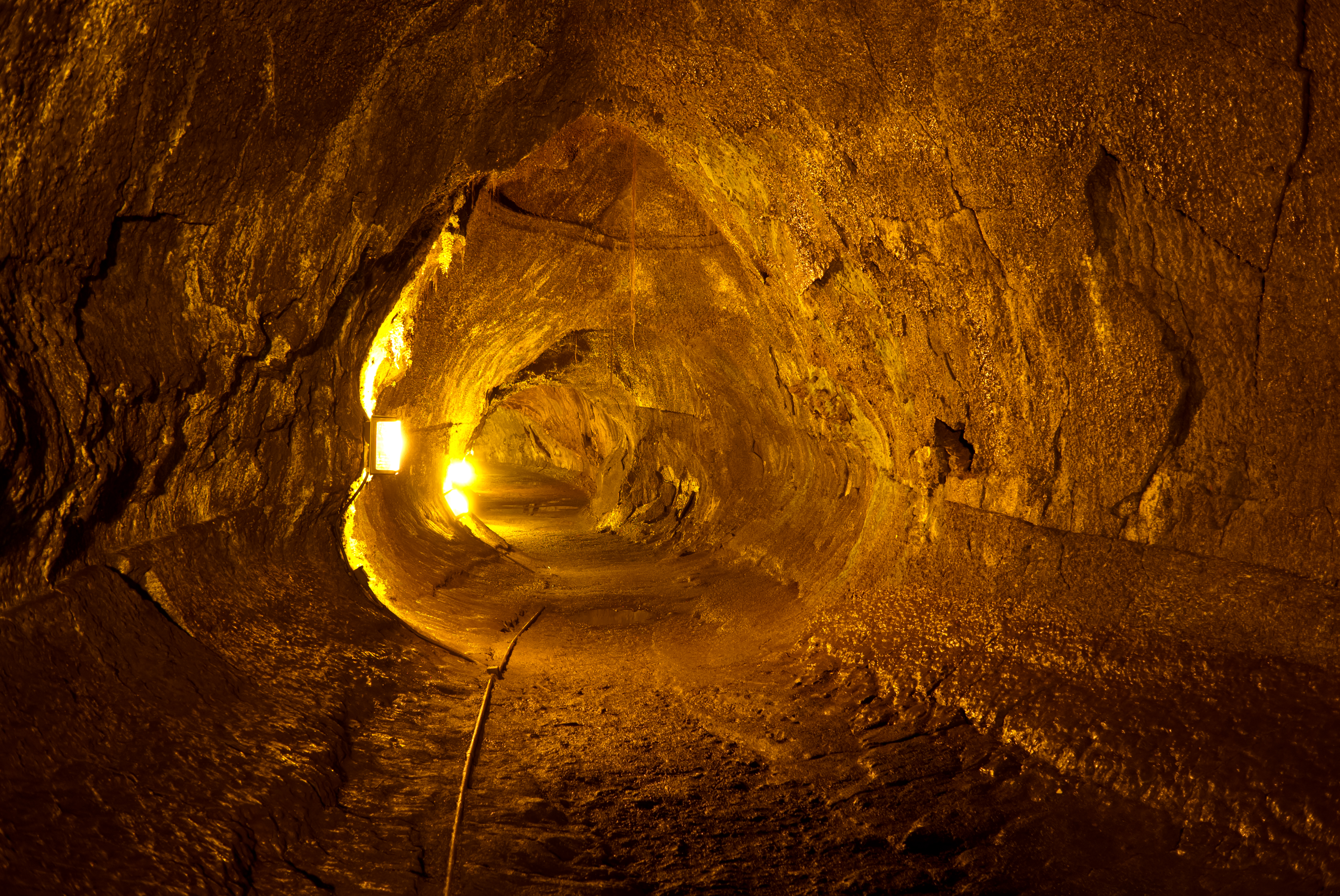
Thurston Lava Tube in Hawaii Volcanoes National Park, Hawaii. The step mark, more visible on the right wall, indicates the depth at which the lava flowed for a period of time.

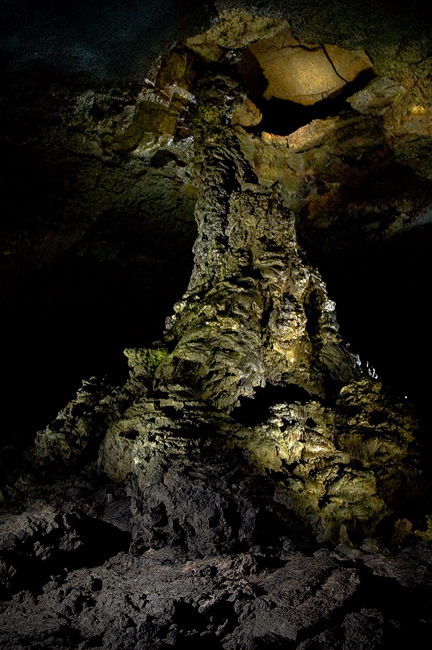
Rare characteristics of lava tubes are lava pillars. This is the Manjanggul lava pillar located in the Manjanggul lava tubes, on the island of Jeju-do, Korea.

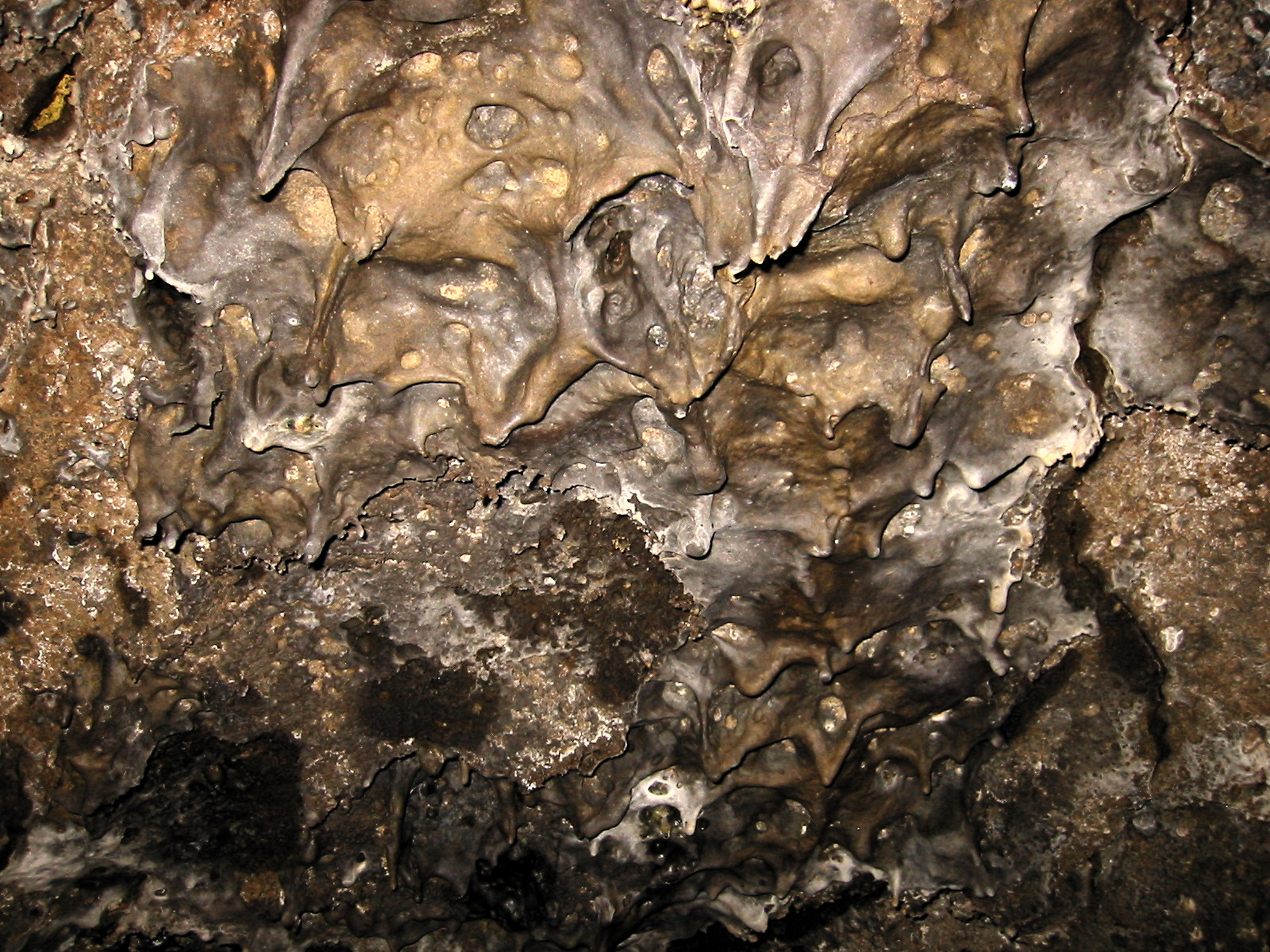
Lavacicles on the ceiling of Mushpot Cave in Lava Beds National Monument

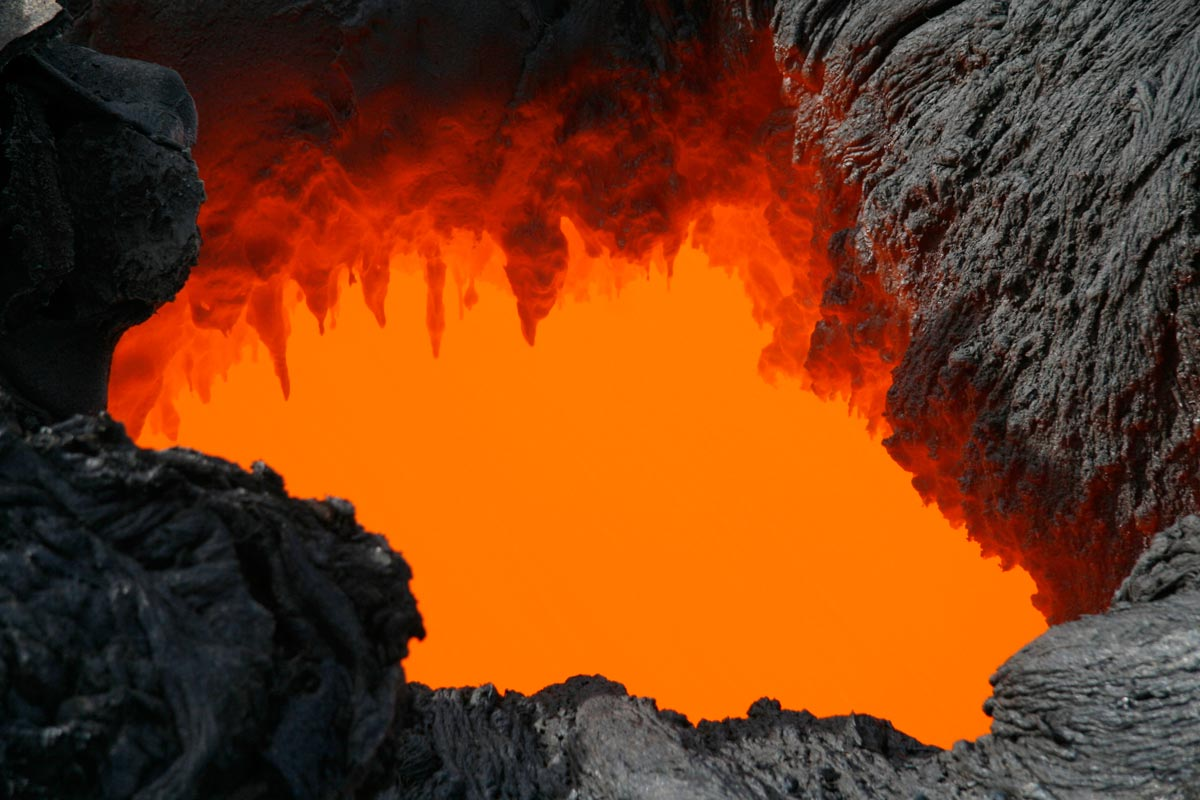
Close-up of a skylight on a coastal plain, with lava stalactites forming on the roof of the tube, Hawaii Volcanoes National Park

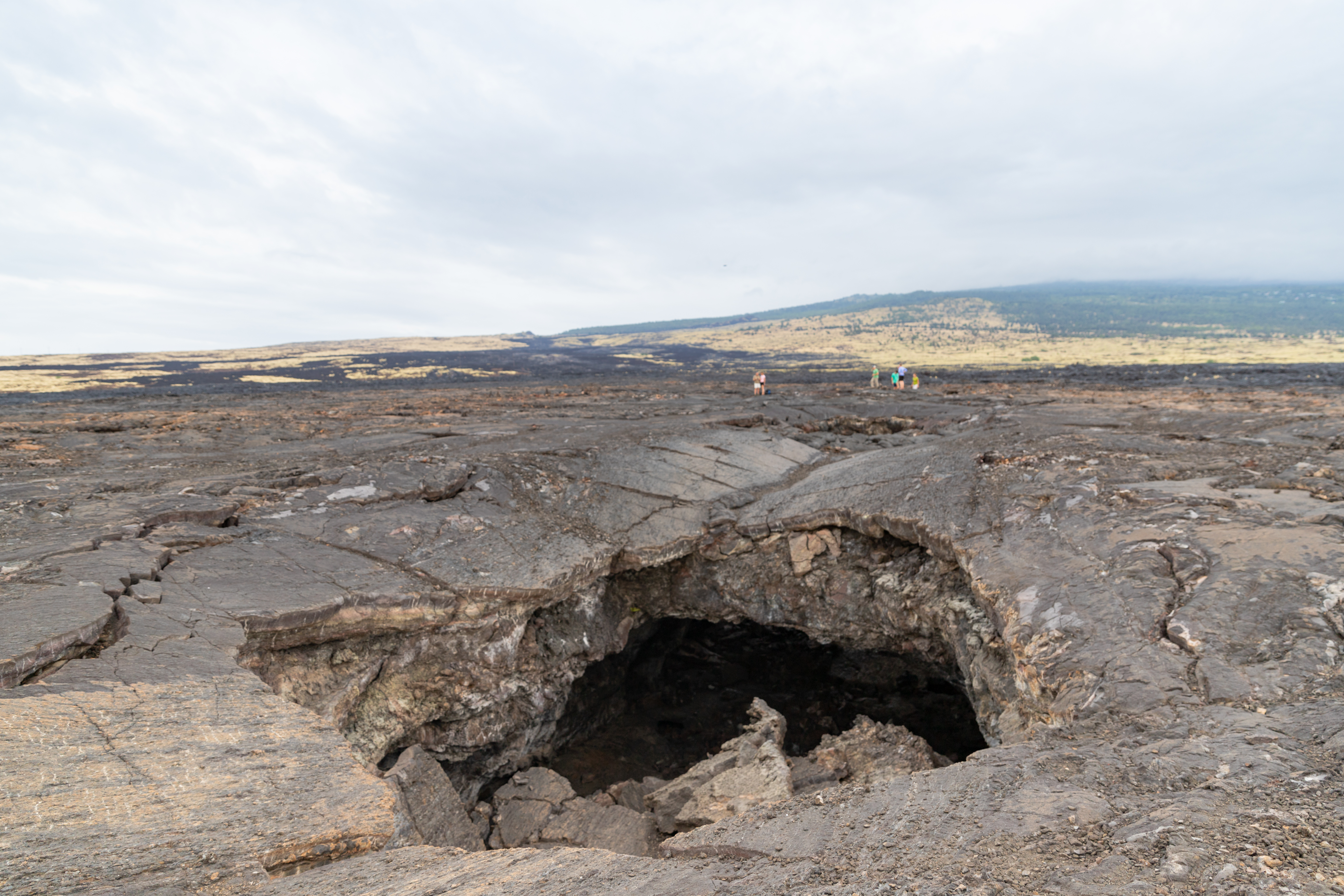
Entrance of a lava tube, Big island, Hawaii

A lava tube, more rarely called a pyroduct or lava tunnel, is a natural roofed conduit along which molten lava flows from a volcanic vent. If lava in the tube drains out, it will leave an empty cave. Lava tubes are common in low-viscosity volcanic systems. Lava tubes transport molten lava much further away from the eruptive vent than lava channels. A tube-forming lava flow can emplace on longer distance due to the presence of a solid crust protecting the molten lava from atmospheric cooling. Lava tubes are often considered when preparing hazard maps or managing an eruptive crisis.

== Formation ==
A lava tube is a type of lava cave formed when a low-viscosity lava flow develops a continuous and hard crust, which thickens and forms a roof above the still-flowing lava stream. Three main formation mechanisms have been described: (1) roofing over a lava channel, (2) pāhoehoe lobe extension or (3) lava flow inflation.

1. When it erupts from a vent, lava usually flows in channels. While the core of the channel tends to stay very hot, its sides cool down rapidly, forming solidified walls called levees. Depending on the activity of the channel, three ways to form a lava tube are possible. If the level of lava flowing inside the channel is stable for a long time, the surface will start to solidify from the levees toward the center of the channel, slowly forming a solid crust. If the level of lava is irregular, the overspill of lava along the levees causes them to grow and eventually join together over the channel. Another way these channels may close is by the accumulation of floating surface crust. This type of lava tube tends to form closer to the eruptive vent.
2. When pahoehoe lava emplaces, it sometimes form lobes. The formation of aligned pahoehoe lobes that are continuously fed by molten lava may form lava tubes.
3. During an eruption, when lava flows emplace and their sides cool rapidly and solidify into levees, the pressure of molten lava passing through the flow may cause it to inflate. The surface of the flow then solidifies as it cools, forming a crust, leading to the formation of a lava tube.

== Characteristics ==
A broad lava-flow field often forms a lava tube system that consists of a main lava tube and a series of smaller tubes that supply lava to the front of one or more separate flows. When the supply of lava stops at the end of an eruption, or lava is diverted elsewhere, lava in the tube system sometimes drains downslope and leaves partially or fully empty caves.

Such drained tubes commonly exhibit numerous internal features that can give information on the activity that happened within the tube. Wall linings are thin layers of lava that cover the walls and ceiling of a tube. They form when the tube drains. Each wall lining corresponds to a cycle of drainage and refilling of the tube. Step marks on the walls indicate the various depths at which the lava flowed. These are known as lava benches, flow ledges or flow lines, depending on how prominently they protrude from the walls. Lava tubes generally have pāhoehoe floors, although this may often be covered in breakdown from the ceiling. A variety of stalactite, generally known as lavacicles, can be observed inside lava tubes. They can be of the splash, "shark tooth", or tubular varieties. Lavacicles are the most common lava tube internal feature. Drip stalagmites may form under tubular lava stalactites, and the latter may grade into a form known as a tubular lava helictite. A runner is a bead of lava that is extruded from a small opening and then runs down a wall.

Lava tubes may also contain mineral deposits that most commonly take the form of crusts or small crystals, and less commonly, as stalactites and stalagmites. Some stalagmites may contain a central conduit and are interpreted as hornitos extruded from the tube floor.

Lava tubes can be up to 15 meters (50 ft) wide, though are often narrower, and run anywhere from 1 to 15 meters (3 to 50 ft) below the surface. Lava tubes can also be extremely long; one tube from the Mauna Loa 1859 flow enters the ocean about 50 kilometers (30 mi) from its eruption point, and the Cueva del Viento–Sobrado system on Teide, Tenerife island, is over 18 kilometers (11 mi) long, due to extensive braided maze areas at the upper zones of the system.

A lava tube system in Kiama, Australia, consists of over 20 tubes, many of which are breakouts of a main lava tube. The largest of these lava tubes is 2 meters (7 ft) in diameter and has columnar jointing due to the large cooling surface. Other tubes have concentric and radial jointing features. These tubes are infilled due to the low slope angle of emplacement.

== Extraterrestrial lava tubes ==
Lunar lava tubes have been discovered Several holes on the lunar surface, including one in the Marius Hills region, have been observed with angled satellite imagery to lead into voids wider than the holes themselves. These are considered as possible collapses into lunar lava tubes.

Martian lava tubes are associated with innumerable lava flows and lava channels on the flanks of Olympus Mons. Partially collapsed lava tubes are visible as chains of pit craters, and broad lava fans formed by lava emerging from intact, subsurface tubes are also common. Evidence of Martian lava tubes has also been observed on the Southeast Tharsis region and Alba Mons.

Caves, including lava tubes, are considered candidate biotopes of interest for extraterrestrial life.

Lava tubes have been studied as possible human habitats, providing natural shielding from radiation.

== Notable examples ==
- Iceland
  - Surtshellir – For a long time, this was the longest known lava tube in the world.
- Italy
  - Grotta dei Tre Livelli - Famous example of a multiple level lava tube.
- Kenya
  - Leviathan Cave – At 12.5 kilometers (7.8 mi), it is the longest lava tube in Africa.
- South Korea
  - Manjang Cave – more than 8 kilometers (5 mi) long, located in Jeju Island, is a popular tourism spot.
- United States
  - Kazumura Cave, Hawaii – The world's most extensive lava tube, at 65.5 kilometers (40.7 mi), it has the greatest linear extent of any known lava cave.

== See also ==
- Caving – Recreational pastime of exploring cave systems
- Geology of the Moon – Structure and composition of the Moon
- Lava cave – Cave formed in volcanic rock, especially one formed via volcanic processes
- Mars habitat – Facility where humans could live on Mars
- Speleology – Science of cave and karst systems
- Speleothem – Structure formed in a cave by the deposition of minerals from water
