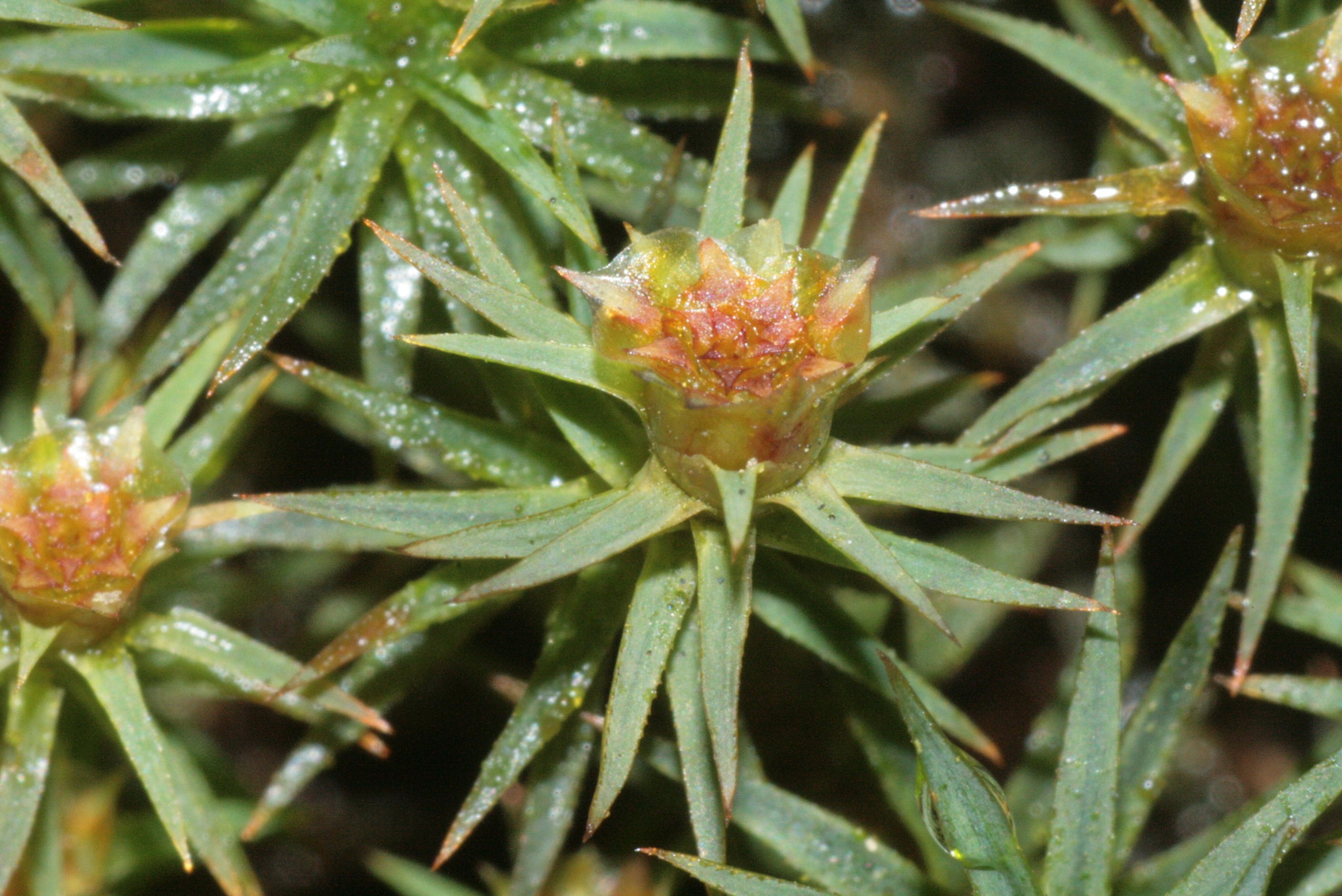

Scientific classification
- Kingdom: Plantae
- Division: Bryophyta
- Class: Polytrichopsida
- Order: Polytrichales
- Family: Polytrichaceae
- Genus: Pogonatum
- Species: P. urnigerum

Binomial name
- Pogonatum urnigerum (Hedw.) P. Beauv.

Synonyms
- Polytrichum urnigerum Hedw.

= Pogonatum urnigerum =

Species of moss

Pogonatum urnigerum is a species of moss in the family Polytrichaceae, commonly called urn haircap. The name comes from "urna" meaning "urn" and "gerere" meaning "to bear" which is believed to be a reference made towards the plant's wide-mouthed capsule. It can be found on gravelly banks or similar habitats and can be identified by the blue tinge to the overall green colour. The stem of this moss is wine red and it has rhizoids that keep the moss anchored to substrates. It is an acrocarpous moss that grows vertically with an archegonium borne at the top of each fertilized female gametophyte shoot which develops an erect sporophyte.

== Range and habitat ==
Pogonatum urnigerum can be found at moderate to high elevations in disturbed areas (near water and roads), sandy soil near water banks, late snow areas, and in narrow fissions of rocks on cliffs.

This species of moss is known to live in many locations across Europe and North America such as in: Greenland, Iceland, Canada, and the United States. In Asia, Pogonatum urnigerum has been found in Japan, China, Korea, Mongolia, India, Himalayas, Philippines, and Papua New Guinea.

== Description ==
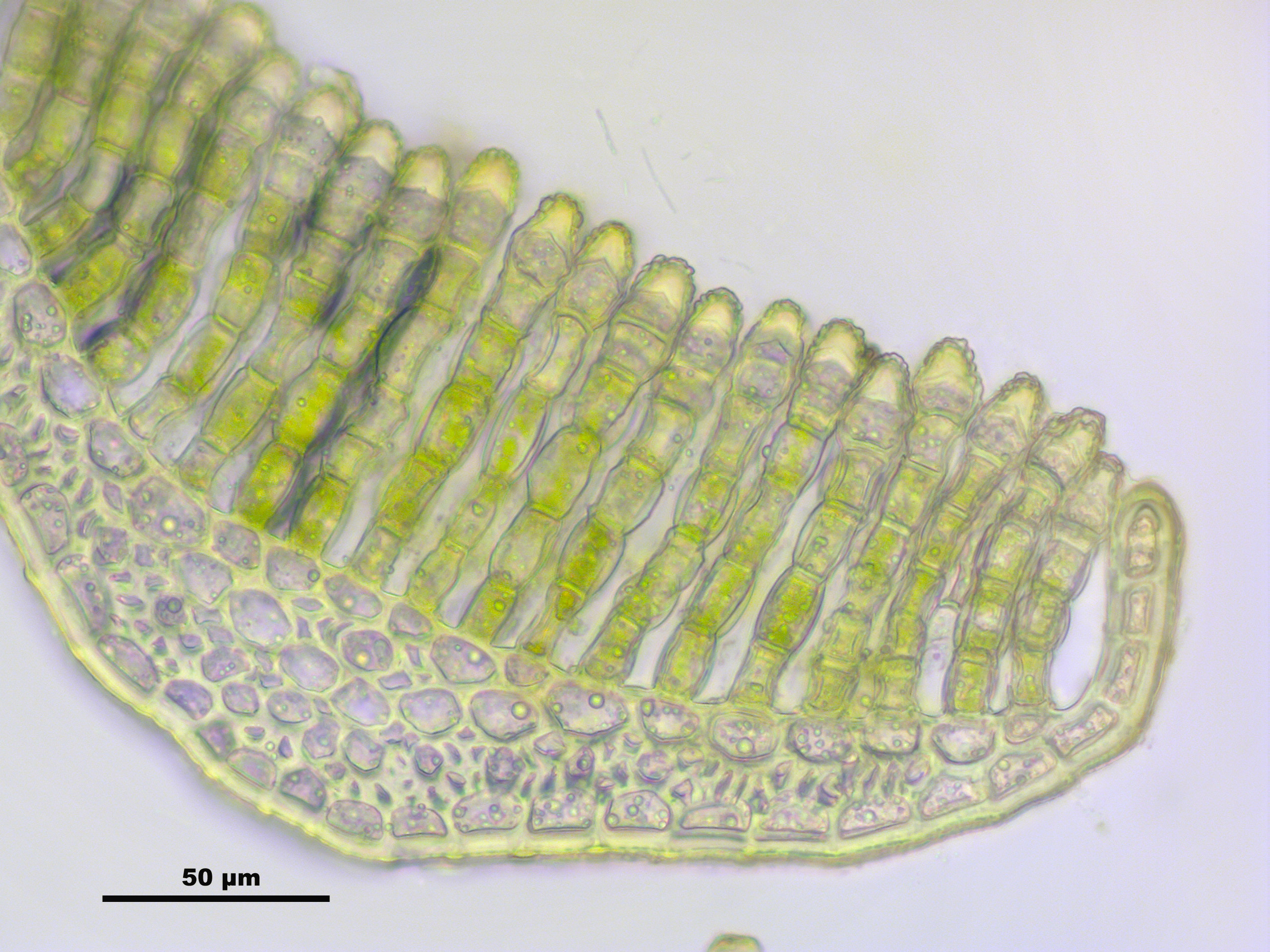
Cross section of a leaf from Pogonatum urnigerum that shows the lamellae, costa, and lamina.

=== Gametophyte ===
The gametophyte is the first and dominant phase of two alternating phases in a bryophyte's life cycle. This part of the life cycle consists of protonema (the preliminary stage where the propagule develops green thread-like filaments), the rhizoids (filaments growing beneath the bryophyte that help anchor the bryophyte to its substratum), the stem, the leaves, its reproductive structure (archegonium in female plants, antheridium in male plants), and the calyptra (a thin tissue that forms from the venter of an archegonium and protects the sporangium as it develops).

Pogonatum urnigerum has a wine-red stem. A leaf of P. urnigerium measures 2.5-6mm in length and consists of a unistratose lamina with many lamellae on the upper surface (adaxial side) of the leaf (30-46 lamellae stacked with pillars of 4-7 cells each). Lamellae are vertical stacks of cells that provide many beneficial functions. Lamellae cells increase photosynthetic tissue and the spaces present between the lamellae aid in gas exchange processes and prevent plant desiccation. The marginal cells of the lamellae are relatively the same size as other lamellae cells, thick walled, circular in shape, yellow-green in colour, and are papillose. Each leaf has a wide base that pinches inward and tapers into a narrow lanceolate. The margin of the leaf is not toothed at the base but is toothed from the part of the leaf that is pinched inward to the tip of the leaf.

=== Sporophyte ===
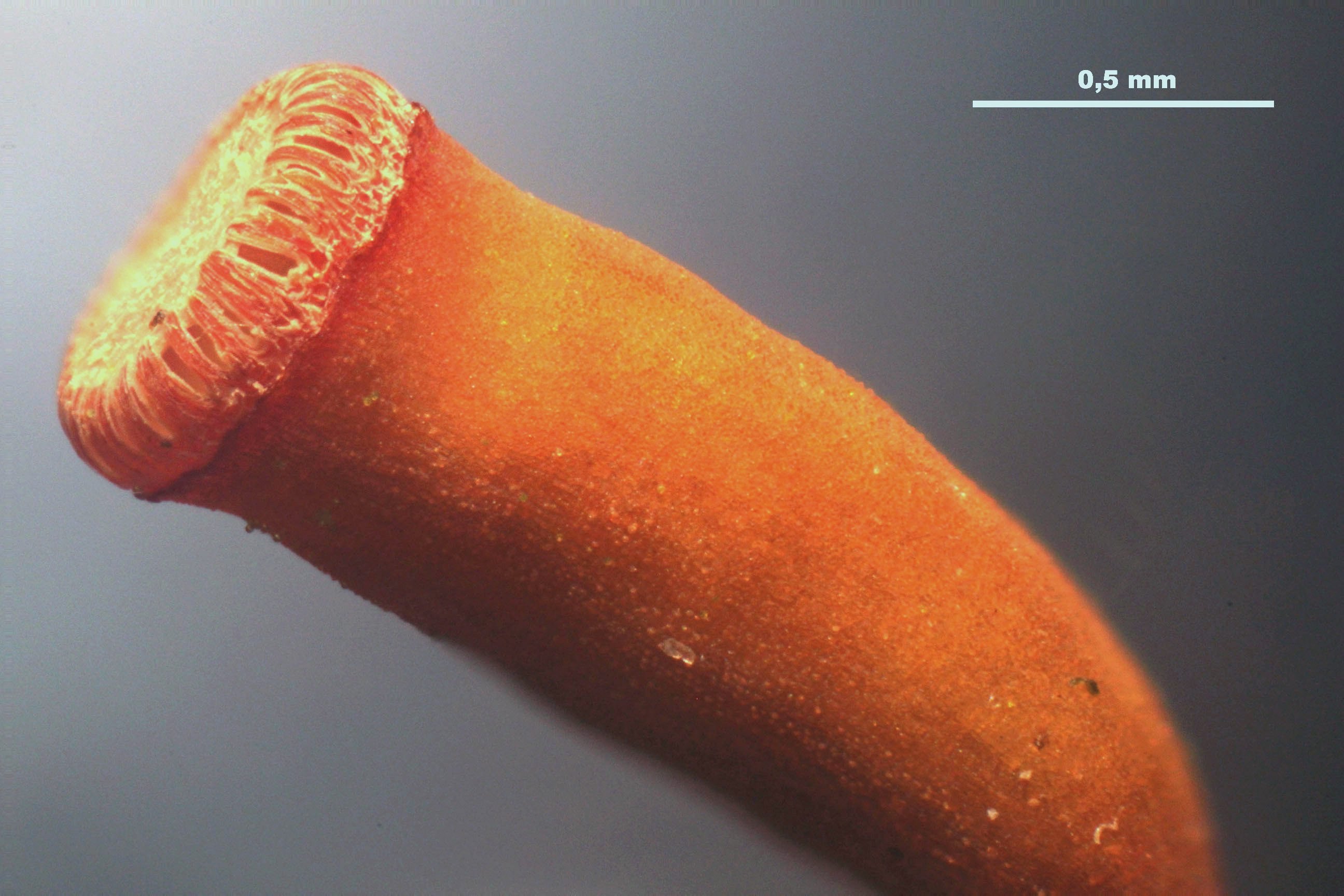
Sporangium of Pogonatum urnigerum with its nematodontous teeth.

The sporophyte is the second phase in a bryophyte's life cycle. This phase consists of the foot (structure that supplies nutrients from the gametophyte to the developing sporophyte), the seta (the structure that elevates the sporangium), the sporangium (the structure where spores mature), and the operculum (a flap that covers the end of the developing sporangium).

In Pogonatum urnigerum, the sporophyte structure takes 6 months to mature during spring and summer. The sporangium fully matures in autumn. The seta measures 1–4 cm in height and is composed of hydroids (water conducting cells), leptoids (conducting cells of sugar and other nutrients), stereids (thick walled cells that provide structural support) and parenchyma cells. Once the seta has elongated, a sporangium develops at the end of the seta. The sporangium has an operculum, epiphragm, columella, sporangial jacket, a spore bearing layer, and nematodontous teeth. Nematodontous teeth are composed of whole, thickened dead cells. Although nematodontous teeth are not hygroscopic, they may aid in spore dispersal through small movements (they do not move much). Before the sporangium has fully matured, it is enclosed within a hairy calyptra (developed from the venter of the archegonium) that falls off after the sporangium has matured. At maturation, the sporangium measures approximately 2-3mm in length, is cylindrically shaped, and light brown to red-brown in colour. After the operculum falls off, the sporangium is ready to reproduce through spore dispersal. Spore dispersal usually occurs in late spring the following year after the sporophyte has fully matured.

== Distinguishing characteristics ==
Pogonatum urnigerum has leaves that grow in more than three rows around its stem which makes the plant appear robust, its leaves and branches do not appear to be flat, it has a midrib, it lacks structures that produce gemmae, its sporangium has thirty-two nematodontous teeth, the bordering cells of the leaves do not differ from the rest of the leaf, white hair points and wrinkles on the ventral side of leaves are absent, numerous lamellae are present on the ventral surface, marginal teeth are present, and the plant may look bluish-green when it is not dry.

== Life cycle ==
Similar to other bryophytes, Pogonatum urnigerum completes its life cycle in two generations which is a cycle called the heteromorphic alternation of generations. It has a dominant gametophyte generation and a shorter sporophyte generation. After being dispersed as a haploid spore, it develops protonema. The first stage of protonema is chloronema which consists of irregular branching, transverse crosswalls, round chloroplasts, and no budding. After further development, the later stage of protonema, caulonema, develops. Caulonema is more regularly branched, has oblique crosswalls, has spindle-shaped chloroplasts and forms buds. Rhizoids also develop to help the gametophyte attach to its substrate. The caulonema buds eventually develop into a full gametophyte which undergoes mitosis to create reproductive sperm or egg (both are haploid, reproductive sperm are housed in an antheridium, an egg is housed in an archegonium). The gametophyte is unisexual and will produce either sperm or egg and not both at the same time. Sperm is transported, often by water, to an archegonium located on the top of a female gametophyte shoot. Once an egg has been fertilized, it develops a diploid sporophyte structure which is composed of a foot, seta, sporangium, and operculum. The foot supplies the developing sporangium with nutrients from the gametophyte. The seta elevates the sporangium. The sporangium develops within a hairy calyptra and produces spores through meiosis. Mature spores are dispersed through the openings of the sporangium's nematodontous teeth either by limited teeth movement or by wind. The small openings between the nematodontous teeth prevent all the spores from being dispersed at once which gives the sporophyte the advantage of dispersing spores over a longer period of time.

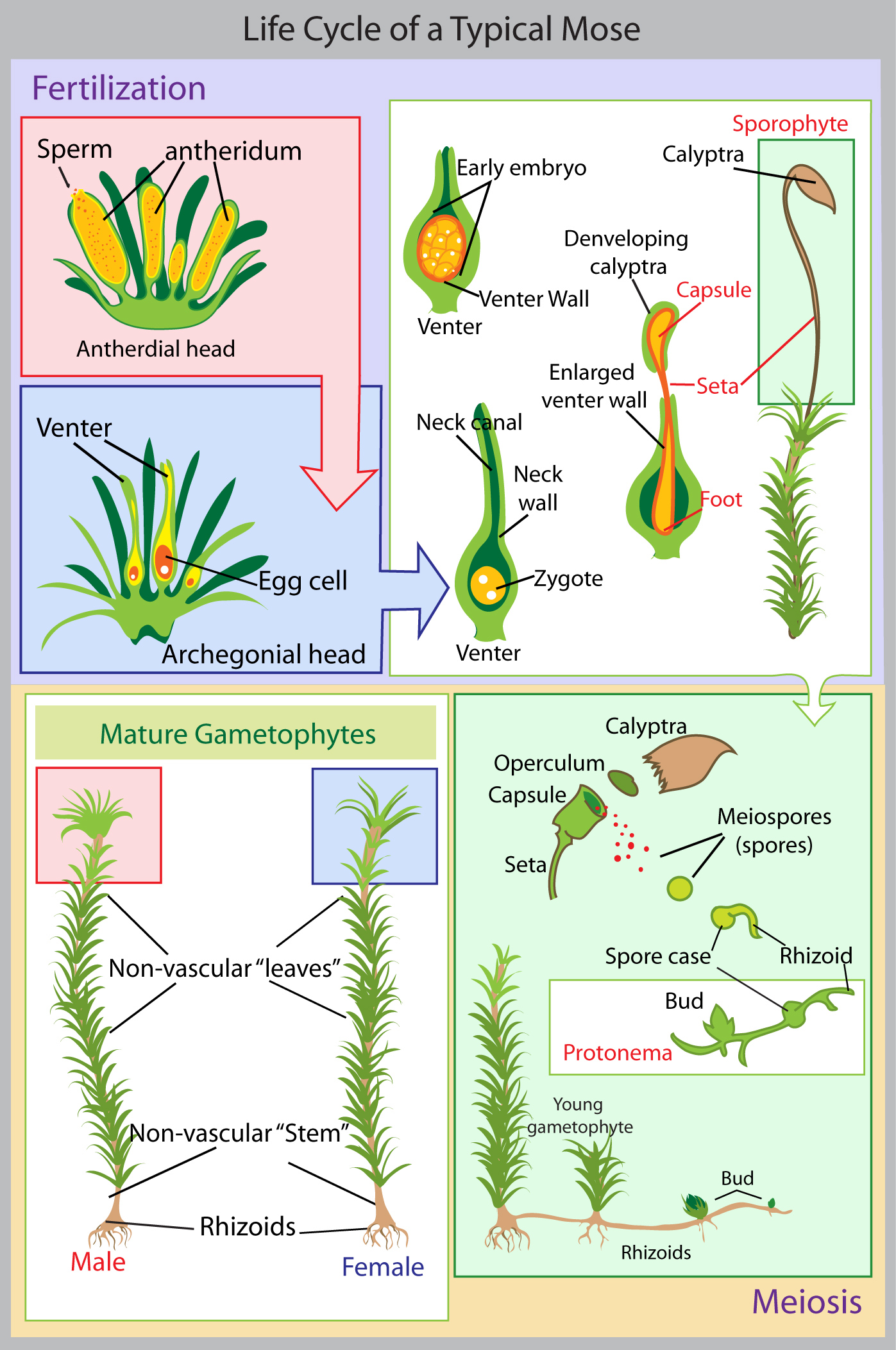
Life cycle of moss.

Through its life cycle, Pogonatum urnigerum alternates between a haploid and diploid life cycle. The haploid structures include: the spores, the protonema, the rhizoids, the leaves, the reproductive structures, the calyptra (developed from an archegonium) and the stem of the gametophyte. Diploid structures include: the foot, the seta, the sporangium, and the operculum.

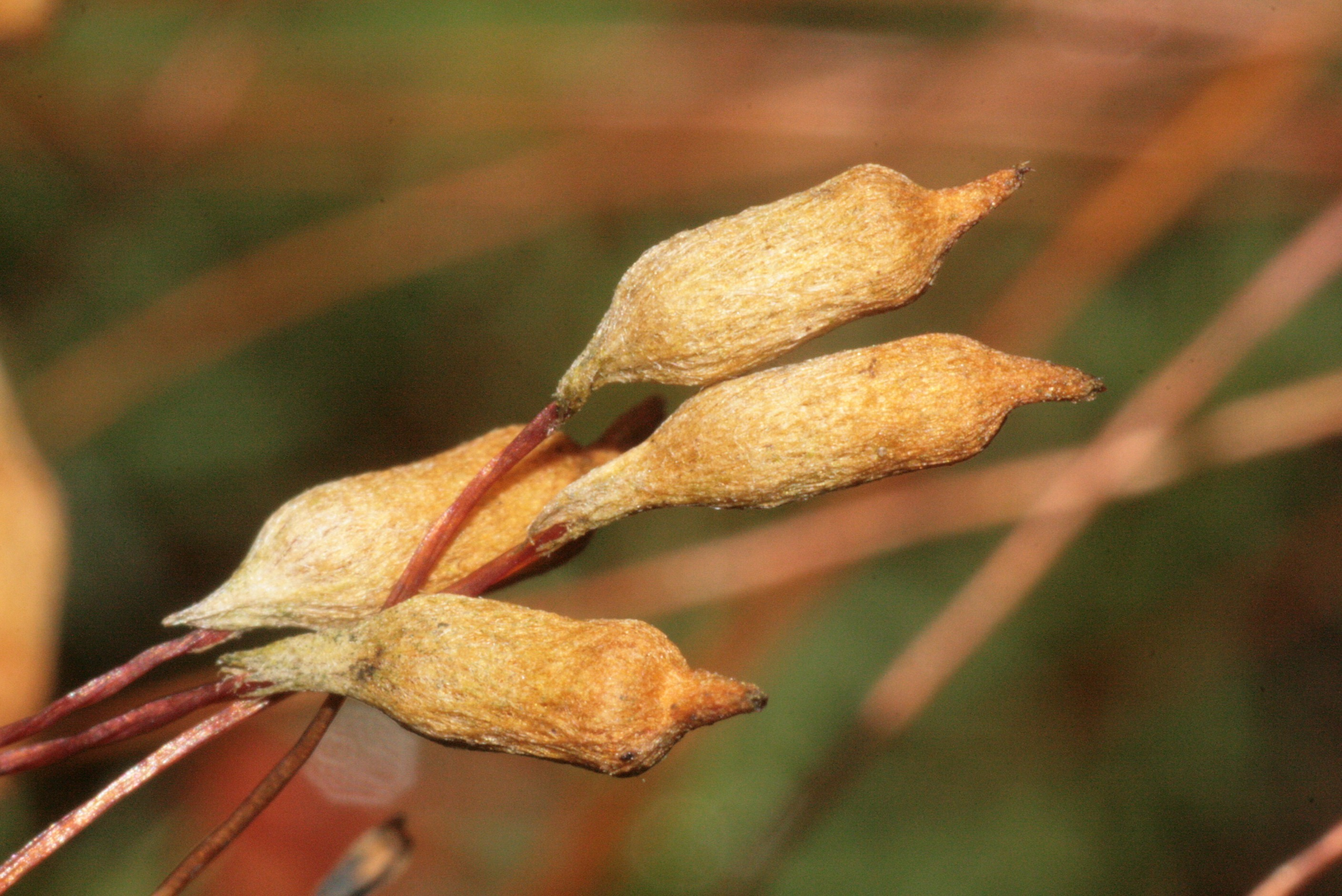
Hairy calpytra of Pogonatum urnigerum.

== Reproduction ==
Pogonatum urnigerum is a dioicous plant that reproduces by spore dispersal. The spores are dispersed over a period of time by the movement of wind or the plant's peristome teeth. Annual growth increments can be found on the stem of this species of moss that resemble the rings of trees. Pogonatum urnigerum does not specialize in asexual reproduction as it lacks gemmae cups and caducous structures that would help itself to asexually reproduce. However, it may asexually reproduce through fragmentation.

=== Reproductive structures ===
==== Antheridium ====
The antheridium (plural: antheridia) is the reproductive structure found on a male bryophyte shoot. An antheridium has a jacket that protects the sperm while they are developing. Once the sperm has matured, the sperm requires water, such as raindrops, to help carry the sperm from an antheridium to an egg located in an archegonium on a female gametophyte shoot. The perigonium structure is composed of an antheridium, paraphyses (sterile filaments that support the reproductive structure of bryophytes), and perigonial leaves.

==== Archegonium ====
On a female bryophyte shoot, the reproductive structure is called the archegonium (plural: archegonia). The structure of an archegonium consists of: a sterile jacket that encloses the egg, a neck, a neck canal that allows the sperm to enter the archegonium to fertilize the egg, a venter that protects the egg and later develops into the calyptra, and the egg itself. When an egg in the archegonium of a female Pogonatum urnigerum shoot is fertilized, it matures and develops the sporophyte structure of the plant which sexually reproduces by producing and dispersing spores. The perichaetium structure is composed by an archegonium, paraphyses and perichaetial leaves. In Pogonatum urnigerum, one seta develops from each perichaetium. The perichaetial leaves also tend to be longer than stem leaves (measuring 5-7mm in length).

== Taxonomy ==
=== Class Polytrichopsida ===
Mosses belonging to the class of Polytrichopsida are known for several defining characteristics such as stem leaves with unistratose lamina, numerous lamellae, a costa, stereids, guide cells, and hydroids. Polytrichopsida mosses also have a strong conducting strand composed of hydroids (water conduction) and leptoids (conduction of sugar and other nutrients), leaf traces, and stereids. Due to the lack of gemmae producing structures in the majority of mosses that belong to this class, Polytrichopsida mosses reproduce sexually by spore dispersal. However, asexual reproduction by fragmentation is possible. This class is also well known for a hairy calyptra that is present in many Polytrichopsida mosses which functions to protect the developing sporangium. Some species of Polytrichum also have biseriate paraphyses in its perigonium (composed of an antheridium, paraphyses and perigonial leaves) structure.

=== Genus Pogonatum ===
Pogonatum urnigerum is a species of moss that belongs to the genus of Pogonatum. Pogonatum mosses are known for forming tufts on their substrates. The leaves of Pogonatum mosses are generally erect and are shaped lanceolate from mid-leaf to the tip and have a wider base. Additionally, these bryophytes have a costa and many lamellae on the upper surface of the leaves. The sporangia of mosses belonging to this genus do not have stomata, they have thirty-two peristome teeth that are composed of entire cells and a hairy calyptra.

At least thirty-two species belongs to the genus of Pogonatum. Listed below are some of the species that belong to Pogonatum:

- Pogonatum aloides (Hedw.) P.Beauv.
- Pogonatum belangeri (Müll.Hal.) A.Jaeger
- Pogonatum campylocarpum (Müll.Hal.) Mitt.
- Pogonatum cirratum (Sw.) Brid.
- Pogonatum contortum (Menzies ex Brid.) Lesq.
- Pogonatum convolutum (Hedw.) P.Beauv.
- Pogonatum dentatum (Menzies ex Brid.) Brid.
- Pogonatum japonicum Sull. & Lesq.
- Pogonatum macrophyllum Dozy & Molk.
- Pogonatum microstomum (R.Br. ex Schwägr.) Brid.
- Pogonatum neesii (Müll.Hal.) Dozy
- Pogonatum nipponicum Nog. & Osada Hayashi
- Pogonatum perichaetiale (Mont.) A.Jaeger
- Pogonatum proliferum (Griff.) Mitt.
- Pogonatum spinulosum Mitt.
- Pogonatum subulatum (Menzies ex Brid.) Brid.
- Pogonatum urnigerum (Hedw.) P.Beauv.
- Pogonatum usambaricum (Broth.) Paris

In a parsimony analysis conducted on the genus of Pogonatum, the species within this genus that are most closely related to Pogonatum urnigerum include: Pogonatum japonicum, Pogonatum dentatum and Pogonatum perichaetiale.

Pogonatum urnigerum may likely be confused with Pogonatum dentatum especially when they are sterile or stunted.

== Conservation ==
In British Columbia, Canada, the province's conservation data centre lists Pogonatum urnigerum's conservation status on the BC List as "Yellow". Yellow status indicates that this species of moss is at a low risk of being lost. At the global status level, Pogonatum urnigerum is listed at a G5 and is considered to be a globally widespread, abundant, and secure species.

== Synonyms ==
Pogonatum urnigerum (Hedw.) P. Beauv. had previously been named Polytrichum urnigerum Hedw.
