= List of caves in the Azores =

The following is a list of the prominent caves formed in the islands of the Azores:

== Corvo ==
- Gruta da Ponta do Marco

== Faial ==
- Furna das Cabras
- Furna Ruim
- Gruta da Rua do Algar
- Gruta das Anelares
- Gruta do Cabeço do Canto
- Gruta do Cruzeiro
- Gruta do Luís Pereira
- Gruta do Parque do Capelo
- Gruta dos Covões

== Flores ==
- Furna Jorge
- Gruta do Galo
- Gruta dos Enxaréus

== Graciosa ==
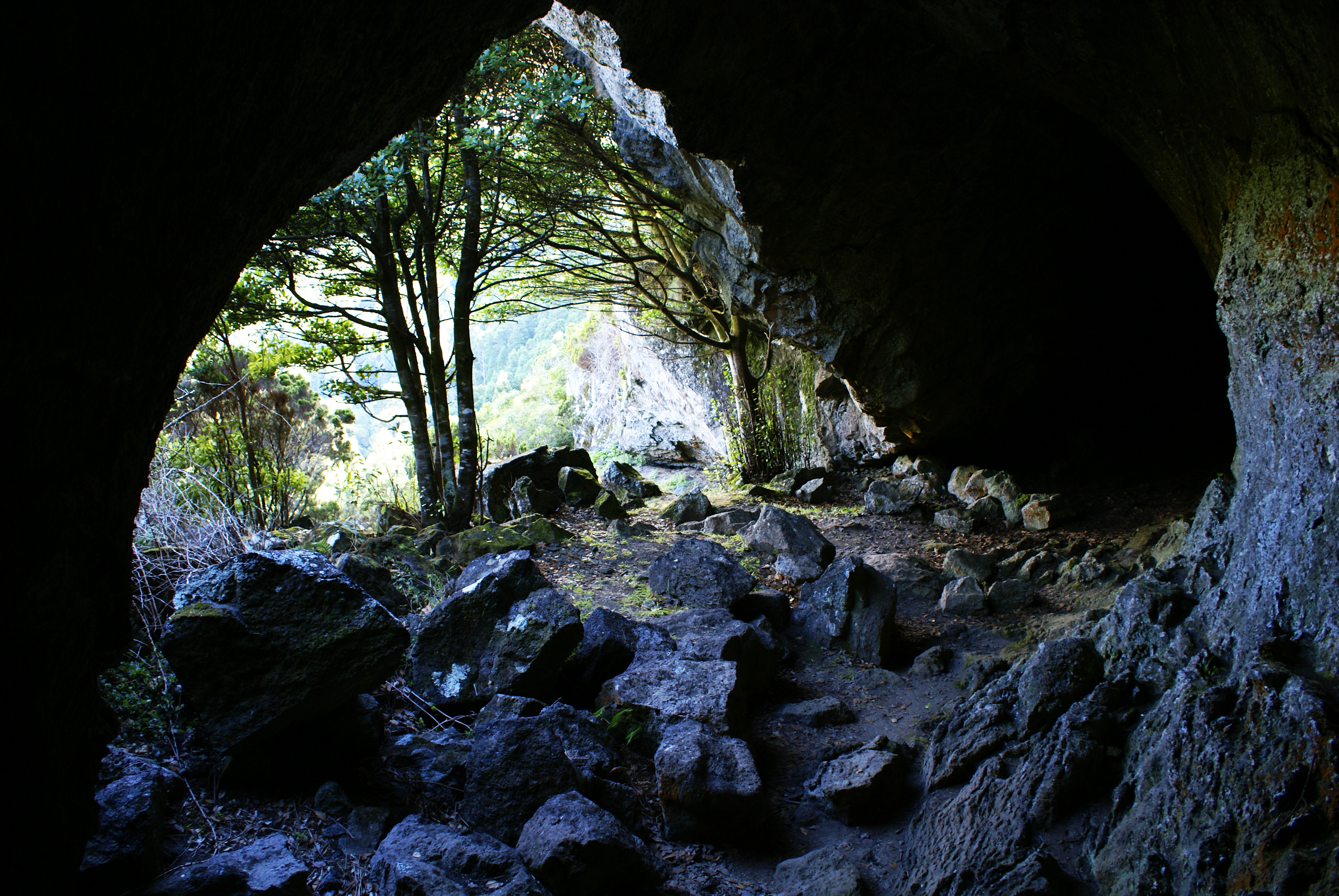
The entranceway to the Furna da Maria Encantada

- Caldeirinha de Pêro Botelho
- Furna d' Água
- Furna da Labarda
- Furna da Lembradeira
- Furna da Maria Encantada
- Furna da Urze
- Furna da Vizinha
- Furna de Manuel de Ávila
- Furna do Abel ou de Lavar
- Furna do Anel
- Furna do Calcinhas
- Furna do Canto
- Furna do Cão
- Furna do Cardo
- Furna do Cavalo
- Furna do Dragoeiro
- Furna do Enxofre
- Furna do Gato
- Furna do Linheiro
- Furna do Luís
- Furna do Moinho
- Furna do Queimado
- Furna do Vermelho
- Furna dos Bolos
- Furna Furada
- Galeria do Forninho
- Gruta de São José
- Gruta do Bom Jesus
- Gruta do Manhengo

== Pico ==
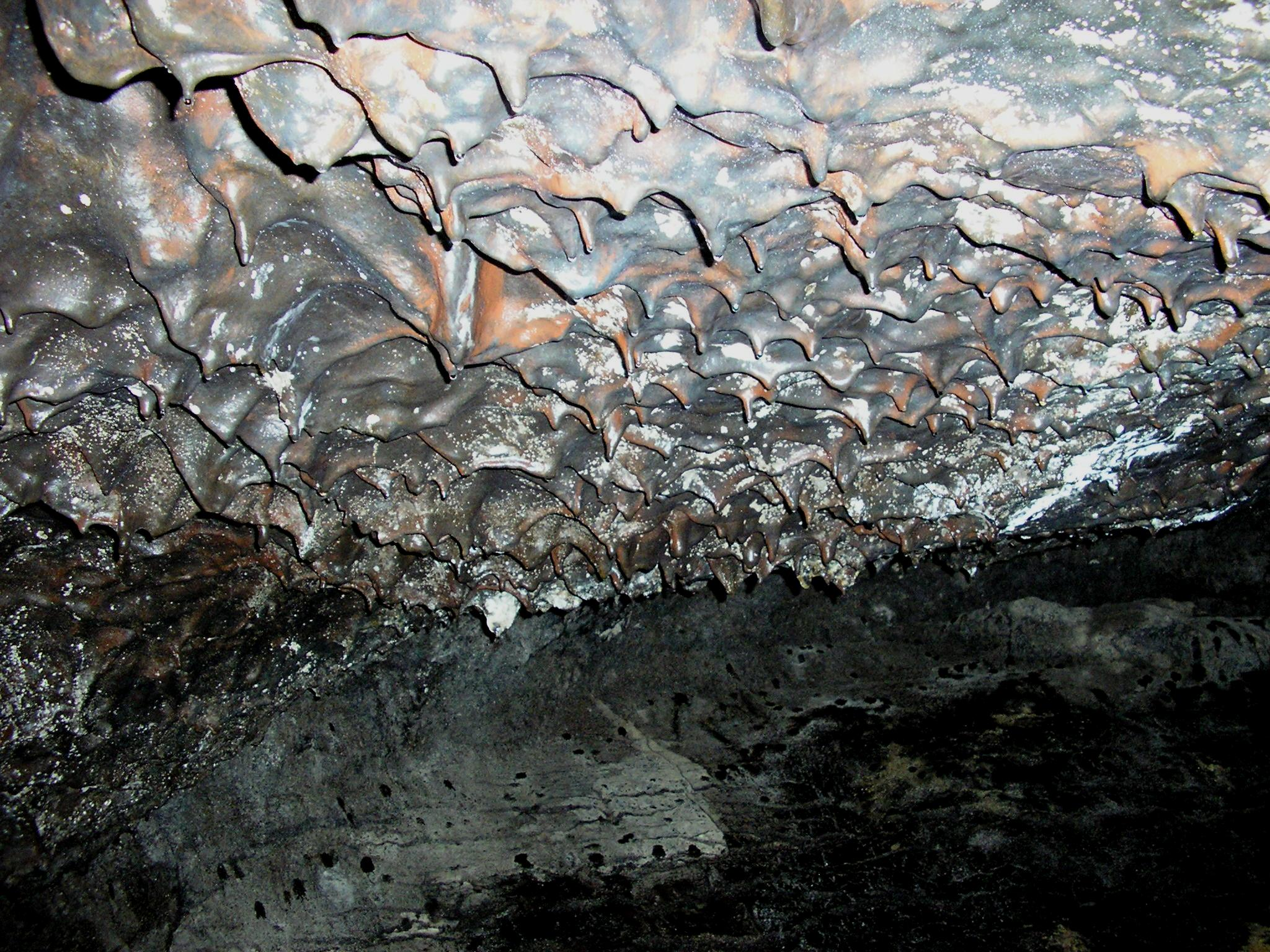
Lavacicles on the roof of one of the Gruta das Torres lava tubes

- Algar da Bagacina
- Algar da Furna do Abrigo
- Algar das Hortelãs
- Algar do Cabeço da Negra
- Algar do Cabeço da Serreta
- Algar do Cabeço do Dório de Baixo
- Algar do Cabeço do Dório de Cima
- Algar do Caixeiro
- Algar do Caralhoto da Montanha
- Algar do Chicharro
- Algar do Lanchão
- Algar do Tambor
- Algar do Tamusgo
- Algar dos Burros
- Algar dos Caralhotos
- Algar dos Terreiros
- Algar dos Túneis
- Algar/Gruta das Silvas
- Algar/Gruta do Alto do Morais
- Algar/Gruta do Cabeço Bravo
- Algar/Gruta do Canto da Serra
- Algar/Gruta do Cogumelo
- Algar José da Silva
- Algares do Miradouro
- Fenda dos Frisos
- Furna da Água
- Furna da Baliza
- Furna da Laje
- Furna da Miragaia
- Furna da Prainha do Galeão
- Furna da Queimada
- Furna da Sapateira
- Furna das Barbeiras
- Furna das Cabras (mar) I
- Furna das Casas
- Furna das Casas Velhas
- Furna das Pombas
- Furna de Henrique Maciel
- Furna do Carregadouro
- Furna do Frei Matias
- Furna do Frei Matias Troço II
- Furna do Frei Matias Troço III
- Furna do Frei Matias Troço IV
- Furna do Lemos
- Furna do Manuel José de Lima
- Furna do Outeiro
- Furna do Tirana
- Furna do Zé Capote
- Furna dos Frades
- Furna dos Mendonças
- Furna dos Vimes
- Furna Nova I
- Furna Nova II
- Furna Vermelha
- Gruta da Agostinha
- Gruta da Baixa da Ribeirinha
- Gruta da Barca (Candelária)
- Gruta da Barca (Madalena)
- Gruta da Canada da Prainha
- Gruta da Cisterna
- Gruta da Estrada Longitudinal I
- Gruta da Estrada Longitudinal II
- Gruta da Pia
- Gruta da Ponte
- Gruta da Ribeira do Fundo
- Gruta da Ribeira dos Bodes
- Gruta da Ribeirinha
- Gruta da Tia Adelaide
- Gruta da Transversal
- Gruta da Travessa do Queimado
- Gruta das Almas
- Furna das Cabras (terra) II
- Gruta das Canárias
- Gruta das Cascatas
- Gruta das Laranjeiras
- Gruta das Pombas
- Gruta das Teias
- Gruta das Torres
- Gruta de São Mateus
- Gruta Detrás do Cabeço
- Gruta do Altinho
- Gruta do Aniceto Mateus
- Gruta do Cabeço Bravo
- Gruta do Cabeço da Negra
- Gruta do Cabeço
- Gruta do Cabeço do Carvalhal
- Gruta do Caminho da Montanha
- Gruta do Caminho do Mato
- Gruta do Canto
- Gruta do Cão
- Gruta do Capitão
- Gruta do Capitão-Mor
- Gruta do Carregadouro II
- Gruta do Cerrado
- Gruta do Dório
- Gruta do Esqueleto
- Gruta do Frei Matias Oeste I
- Gruta do Frei Matias Oeste II
- Gruta do Frei Matias Oeste III
- Gruta do Furtado
- Gruta do Gabriel
- Gruta do Galeão II
- Gruta do Guindaste
- Gruta do Junçalinho
- Gruta do Lajido do Meio
- Gruta do Mistério da Silveira I
- Gruta do Mistério da Silveira II
- Gruta do Mistério da Silveira III
- Gruta do Poço Novo
- Gruta do Ramal de Santo Amaro
- Gruta do Ruivo
- Gruta do Salazar
- Gruta do Soldão
- Gruta do Sumidouro
- Gruta do Tambor Estrada
- Gruta do Tanquinho
- Gruta do Tubarão
- Gruta do Zé Pereira
- Gruta dos Algares
- Gruta dos Arcos
- Gruta dos Azevinhos
- Gruta dos Bodes
- Gruta dos Cogumelos
- Gruta dos Cortiços
- Gruta dos Montanheiros
- Gruta dos Túmulos
- Gruta Grande do Cabeço Bravo
- Gruta Pequena do Cabeço Bravo
- Gruta Tavares de Melo
- Tubo do Rochedo

== Santa Maria ==
- Furna do Ilhéu do Romeiro
- Furna Velha
- Gruta das Figueiras
- Gruta de Santana

== São Jorge ==
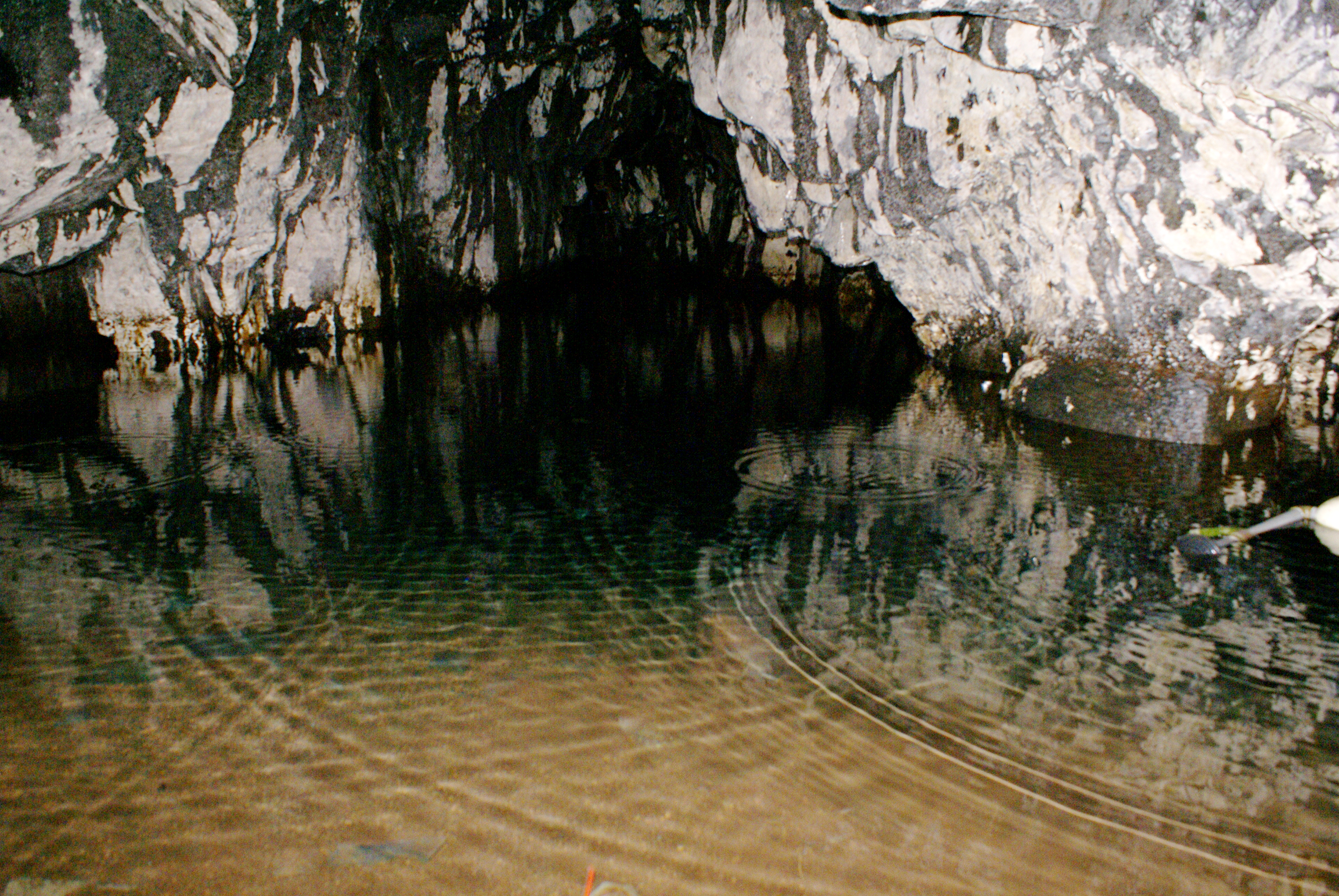
The Furna do Poio, due to its closeness to the sea, resulted in the seepage of water forming a subterranean pond.

- Algar das Bocas do Fogo
- Algar do Morro Pelado
- Algar do Pico da Maria Pires
- Algar dos Suspiros I
- Algar dos Suspiros II
- Furna da Preguiça
- Furna da Recta da Cruz
- Furna da Vigia I
- Furna da Vigia II
- Furna das Pombas
- Furna do Poio
- Furna do Pombal
- Galeria do Toledo
- Gruta da Beira
- Gruta da Canada do Pedroso
- Gruta da Granja
- Gruta da Lomba do Gato
- Gruta da Ribeira do Almeida
- Gruta da Ribeira Seca
- Gruta das Três Bocas
- Gruta do Cerrado dos Algares
- Gruta do Leão
- Gruta dos Encantados
- Grutas do Algar do Montoso

== São Miguel ==
- Algar da Batalha
- Algar da Ribeirinha
- Algar do Pico Queimado
- Cova dos Urnos
- Caldeirão
- Fenda do Pico Queimado
- Gruta António Borges
- Gruta da Candelária
- Gruta da Giesta
- Gruta da Lagoa
- Gruta da Manguinha
- Gruta da Nordela
- Gruta da Quinta Irene
- Gruta da Rua do Paim (Carvão II)
- Gruta da Rua João do Rego (Carvão III)
- Gruta da Rua José Bensaúde
- Gruta da Soledade
- Gruta das Arribanas
- Gruta das Escadinhas
- Gruta das Feteiras
- Gruta das Queimadas
- Gruta de Água de Pau
- Gruta de Rabo de Peixe
- Gruta de Santa Clara
- Gruta de São Pedro
- Gruta de Vila Franca
- Gruta do Carvão
- Gruta do Enforcado
- Gruta do Esqueleto
- Gruta do Livramento
- Gruta do Pico da Cruz
- Gruta do Pico do Funcho
- Gruta dos Valados
- Panela da Caloura
- Túnel da Caloura

== Terceira ==
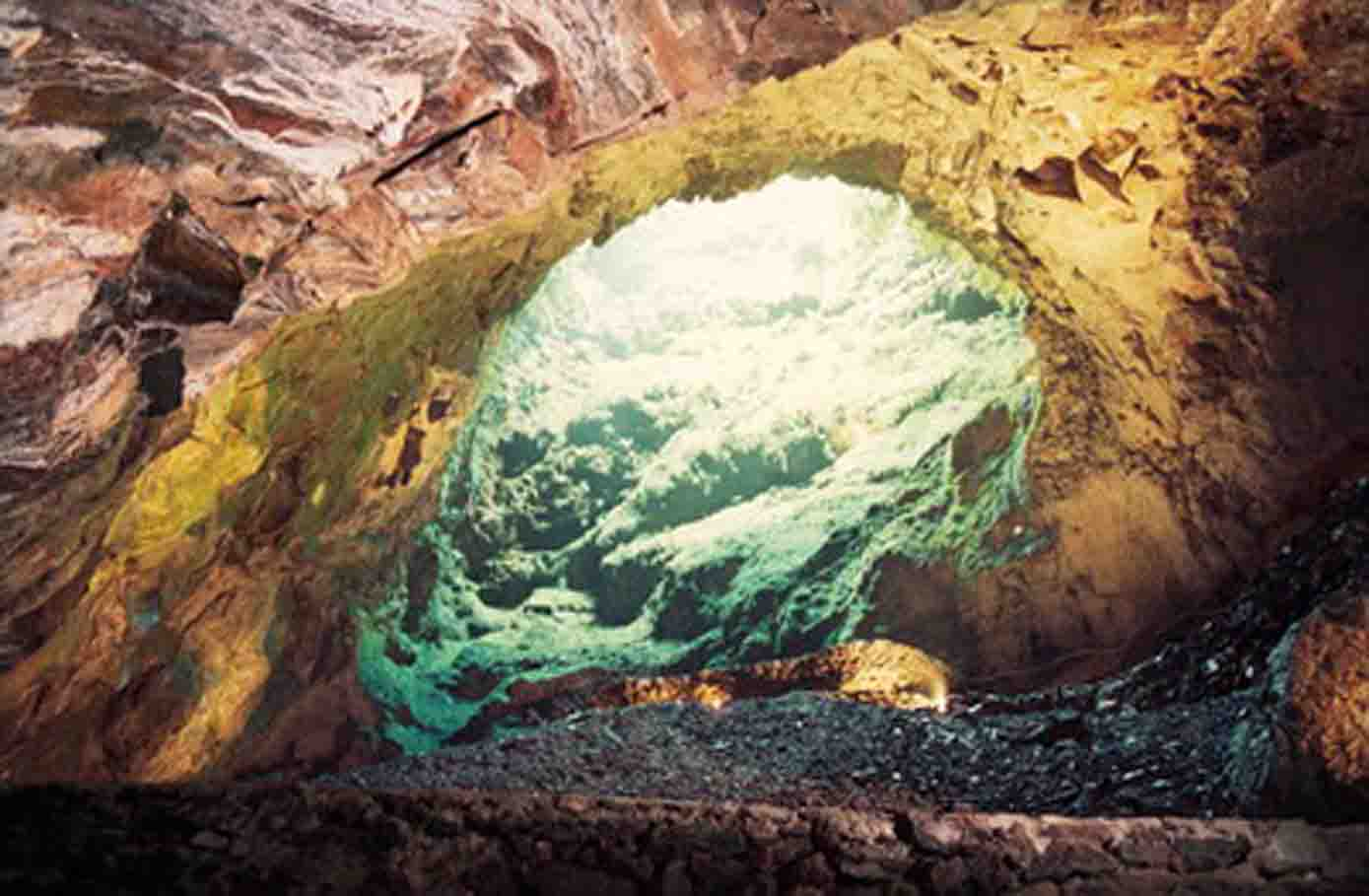
A view of the Algar do Carvão, accessible from the nature centre in Posto Santo

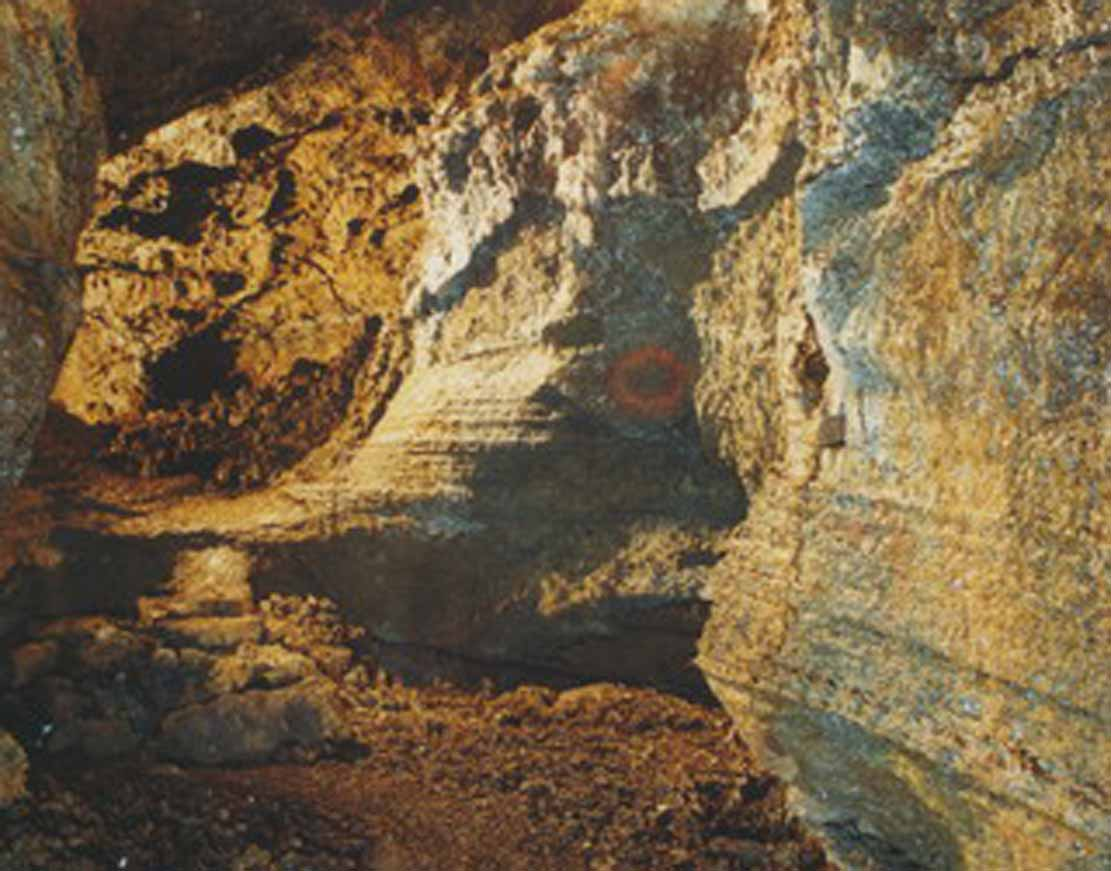
A passage within the Gruta do Natal system, carved from lava flows

- Algar Adérito de Freitas
- Algar da Canada do Laranjo
- Algar das Furnas
- Algar do Biscoitinho
- Algar do Canadão
- Algar do Carvão
- Algar do Chambre
- Algar do Funil
- Algar do João Caldo Quente
- Algar do Juncal
- Algar do Negro
- Algar do Pico Alto
- Algar do Pico do Funil
- Algar do Pico Gaspar I
- Algar do Pico Gaspar II
- Algar dos Funis
- Algar/Gruta do Mistério
- Algar/Gruta do Pico das Dez
- Cova do Caldeirão (Sé)
- Cova do Caldeirão (Serreta)
- Fenda do Pico Zimbreiro
- Furna da Bugia
- Furna da Nascente
- Furna da Rua Longa
- Furna das Feiticeiras
- Furna das Pombas
- Furna d' Água
- Furna de Santa Maria
- Furna do Cabrito
- Furna do Frade
- Furna do Poço Negro
- Furna do Portão
- Furna dos Ninhos
- Galeria da Queimada
- Galeria da Ribeira Seca
- Galeria do Fanal
- Galeria do Felisberto Joaquim
- Galeria do Sequeira
- Galerias da Feteira
- Gruta Brisa Azul
- Gruta da Achada
- Gruta da Baía de Vila Maria
- Gruta da Branca Opala
- Gruta da Canada do Laranjo
- Gruta da Cascata
- Gruta da Chamusca
- Gruta da Madre de Deus
- Gruta da Malha
- Gruta da Malha Grande
- Gruta da Santinha
- Gruta da Terra Mole
- Gruta das Agulhas
- Gruta das Cinco Ribeiras
- Gruta das Laranjas
- Gruta das Mercês I
- Gruta das Mercês II
- Gruta de Santa Catarina
- Gruta de Santo António
- Gruta do Alicerce
- Gruta do Baldio
- Gruta do Caldeira
- Gruta do Camarão
- Gruta do Camelo
- Gruta do Cerro I
- Gruta do Cerro II
- Gruta do Cerro III
- Gruta do Chocolate
- Gruta do Coelho
- Gruta do Esqueleto
- Gruta do Golfe
- Gruta do Natal
- Gruta do Pico do Funil
- Gruta do Tanque
- Gruta do Zé Grande I
- Gruta do Zé Grande II
- Gruta dos Balcões
- Gruta dos Buracos
- Gruta dos Morros da Azenha
- Gruta dos Principiantes
- Gruta dos Ratões
- Gruta dos Ratos
- Gruta Pequena
- Tubo I do Monte Brasil
- Tubo II do Monte Brasil

== See also ==
- List of caves
