= Gruta das Agulhas =

- Interactive map of Gruta das Agulhas
- Location: Terceira Island (Azores), Portugal
- Coordinates: 38°38′40.51″N 27°6′18.40″W
- Length: 250.5 metres (822 ft)
- Discovery: 1967
- Geology: Lava tube, Basalt
- Entrances: 1
- Access: Access restricted to public

Gruta das Agulhas (Needle Cave) is a cave located along the promontory of Ponta dos Coelhos, in the Bay of Refugo, in the civil parish of Porto Judeu, in the municipality of Angra do Heroísmo, the Portuguese archipelago of the Azores.

The cave is situated along the coast of Salga, along the high cliffs of the promontory, formed from an accumulation of lava flows. It was formed during the eruption of the volcano associated with the Algar do Carvão, which flowed to the sea, arriving at the coast of Serretinha, in the civil parish of Feteira. The flow spread to Porto Judeu, forming a coastal geomorphology of black basalt of large dimensions, arribas and coves of dangerous cliffs. As the lava, which was primarily aa and pahoehoe, flowed into these tubes slowly decreased, it left hollow caverns opening into galleries, some of various kilometres of length.

It obtained its name from the great quantity of needle-like sedimentary deposited on the rocks and ceiling of the lava tube, ranging from .2–.5 centimetres (0.079–0.197 in). The 250.5 metres (822 ft) gallery is situated over a smaller gallery that is 30 metres (98 ft) wide. The tube's extent is carved by layers (or steps) sculpted by various lava flow cycles. The Gruta das Agulhas is at its highest point 5.4 metres (18 ft) and at the widest point 4.5 metres (15 ft).

The cave was discovered and explored until its exit at the sea by the Associação Espeleológica Os Montanheiros in 1967. Since it was discovered, the cave has been studied for its varied fauna and geological importance. Of note, were species of Troglofauna, including Pseudoblothrus vulcanus, Macarorchestia martini and Pseudosinella ashmoleorum, in addition to endemic species like Phthiracarus falciformis, Orchestia chevreuxi and Pseudosinella azorica.

Eventually, the space was illuminated and an entranceway constructed to restrict access into the space by Os Montanheiros. Due to sea erosion, access was restricted to the public.
