= P. mitis =

P. mitis may refer to one of the following species:

== Animals ==
- Problepsis mitis, a species of moth found in Mauritius
- Pyrausta mitis, a species of moth found in Chile

== Plants ==
- Persicaria mitis, a species of flowering plant
- Phyllostachys mitis, a species of bamboo
- Polytrichadelphus mitis, a species of moss
- Prunus mitis, a synonym for a type of Plum found in the United States
