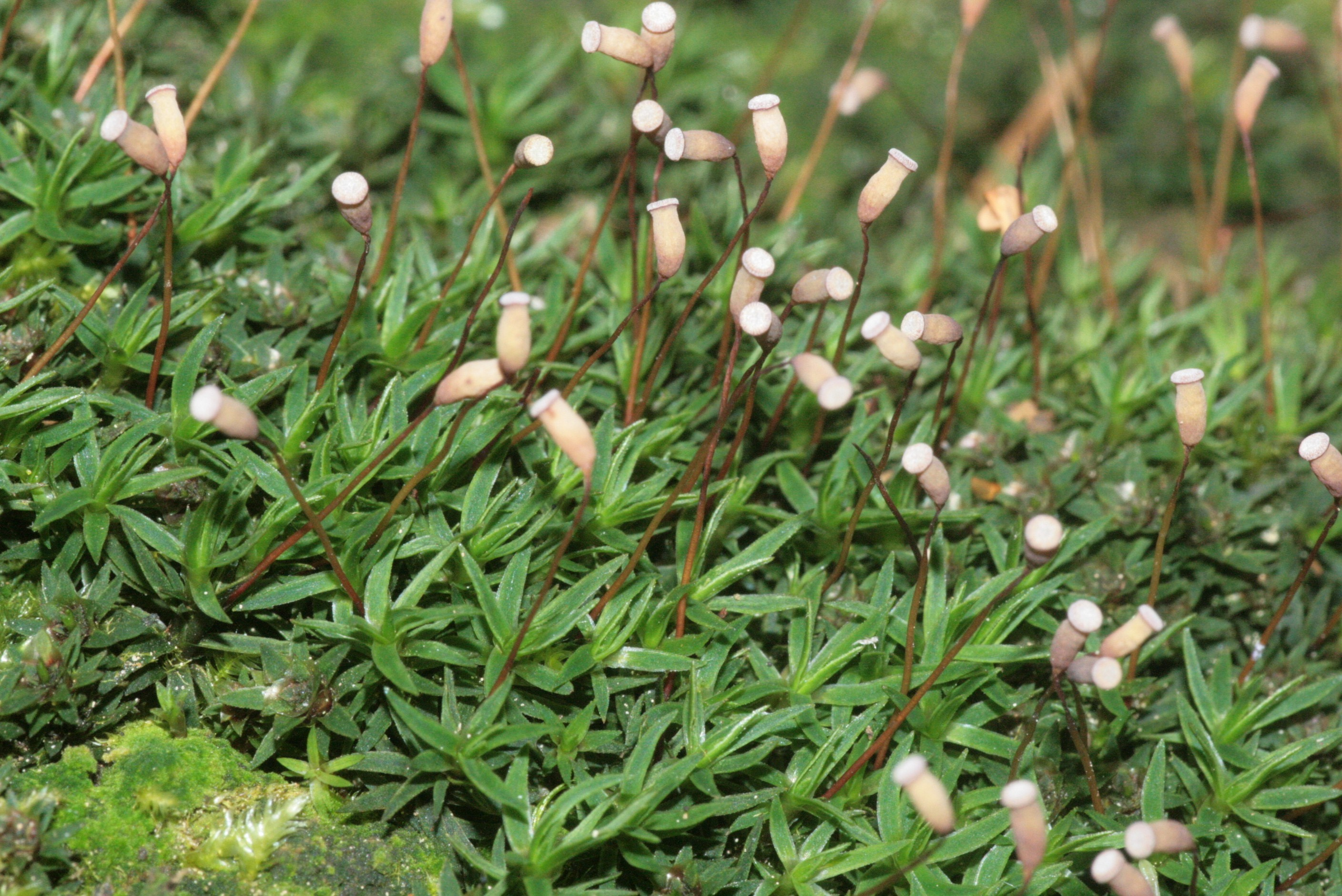

Scientific classification
- Kingdom: Plantae
- Division: Bryophyta
- Class: Polytrichopsida
- Order: Polytrichales
- Family: Polytrichaceae
- Genus: Pogonatum
- Species: P. aloides

Binomial name
- Pogonatum aloides Palisot de Beauvois, 1805

= Pogonatum aloides =

Species of moss

Pogonatum aloides is a species of moss belonging to the family Polytrichaceae.

It is native to Eurasia and Northern America.
