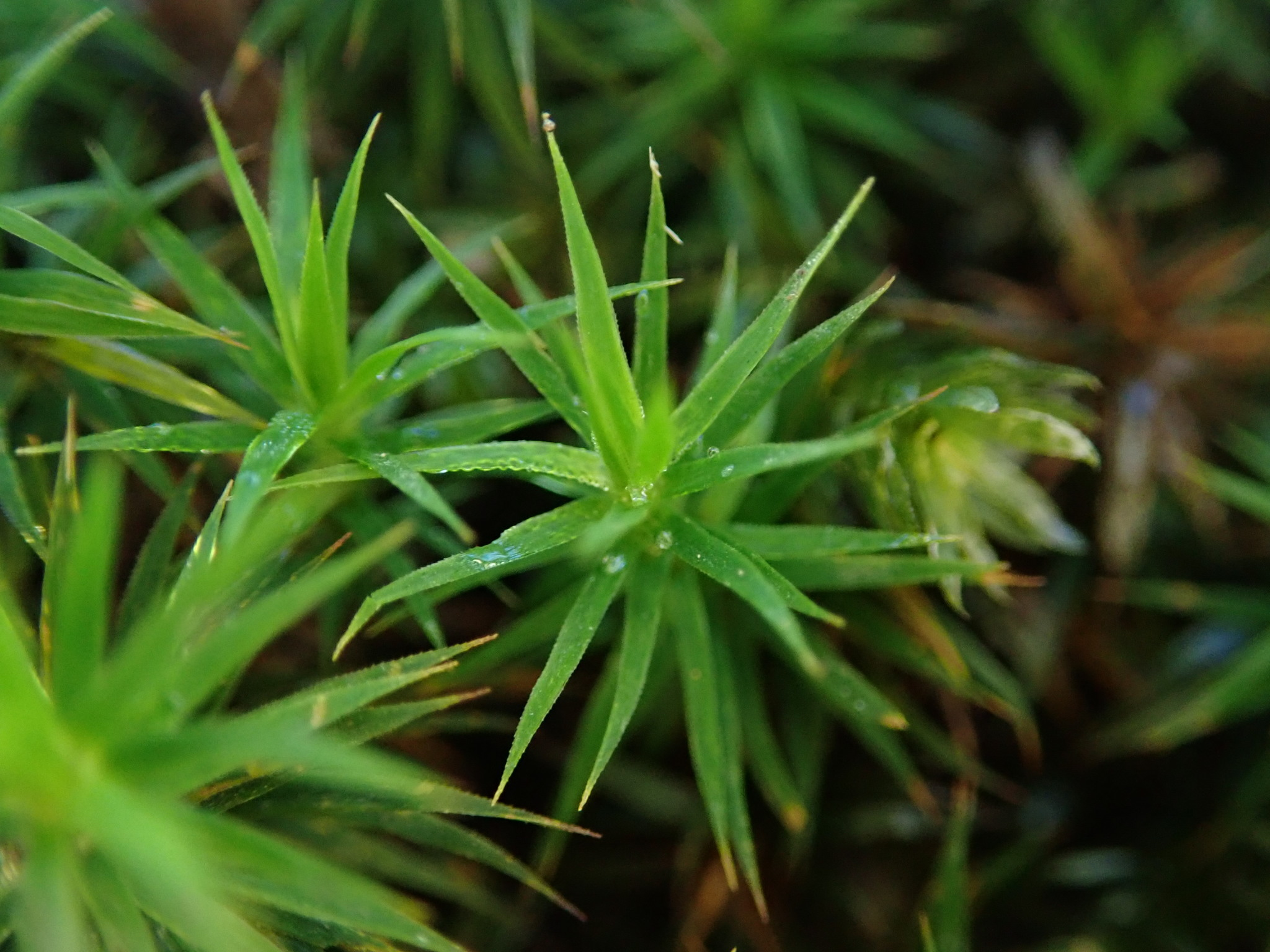

Conservation status
- Secure (NatureServe)

Scientific classification
- Kingdom: Plantae
- Division: Bryophyta
- Class: Polytrichopsida
- Order: Polytrichales
- Family: Polytrichaceae
- Genus: Polytrichastrum
- Species: P. formosum

Binomial name
- Polytrichastrum formosum (Hedw.) G.L. Smith

= Polytrichastrum formosum =

Species of moss

Polytrichastrum formosum, commonly known as the bank haircap moss, is a species of moss belonging to the family Polytrichaceae.

It has a cosmopolitan distribution, found mostly in temperate latitudes in the Northern Hemisphere and especially dominant in Europe and North America. However, it has also been identified in India, China, Nepal, Japan, Algeria, Australia, New Zealand, Russia, Turkey, Syria, and the Atlantic islands (i.e. Iceland).

This species was previously called Polytrichum formosum but has been reclassified as Polytrichastrum formosum due to distinct sporangial features. Recent molecular studies suggest that it should be moved back to its original genus (Polytrichum), however bryologists have not yet reached a consensus.

== Habitat ==
Polytrichastrum formosum generally inhabits shaded, poor soils and humus in damp coniferous forests and cool temperate rainforests. This species is most common in Europe and grows in grasslands, lowland heaths, acidic moorlands, rocky slopes, and old buildings.

== Gametophyte ==
Like all moss, the haploid gametophyte is the dominant phase of the lifecycle of P. formosum. The moss gametophyte has photosynthetic leaves, a stem, and root-like rhizoids that anchor them to the substrate.

Polytrichastrum formosum is a medium to large robust acrocarpous moss, growing in uncrowded, unbranching tufts. Its colour ranges from green to dark olive green to greenish black. The stems of mature plants are generally 3 to 8 cm tall, however they can be as short as 2 cm or as tall as 20 cm. P. formosum, like all members of Polytrichaceae, is an endohydric moss, meaning water conduction occurs internally. This process is made possible by a central conducting strand in the stem, made up of hydroids, which are cells specialized for water transport. The stem also contains leptoids and specialized parenchyma cells that are used for conducting sugars throughout the plant. The hydrome (made of hydroids) and leptome (made of leptoids) are considered analogous in function to xylem and phloem in vascular plants. For structural support there are also thick-walled stereid cells circling the hydrome, which helps the moss grow tall.

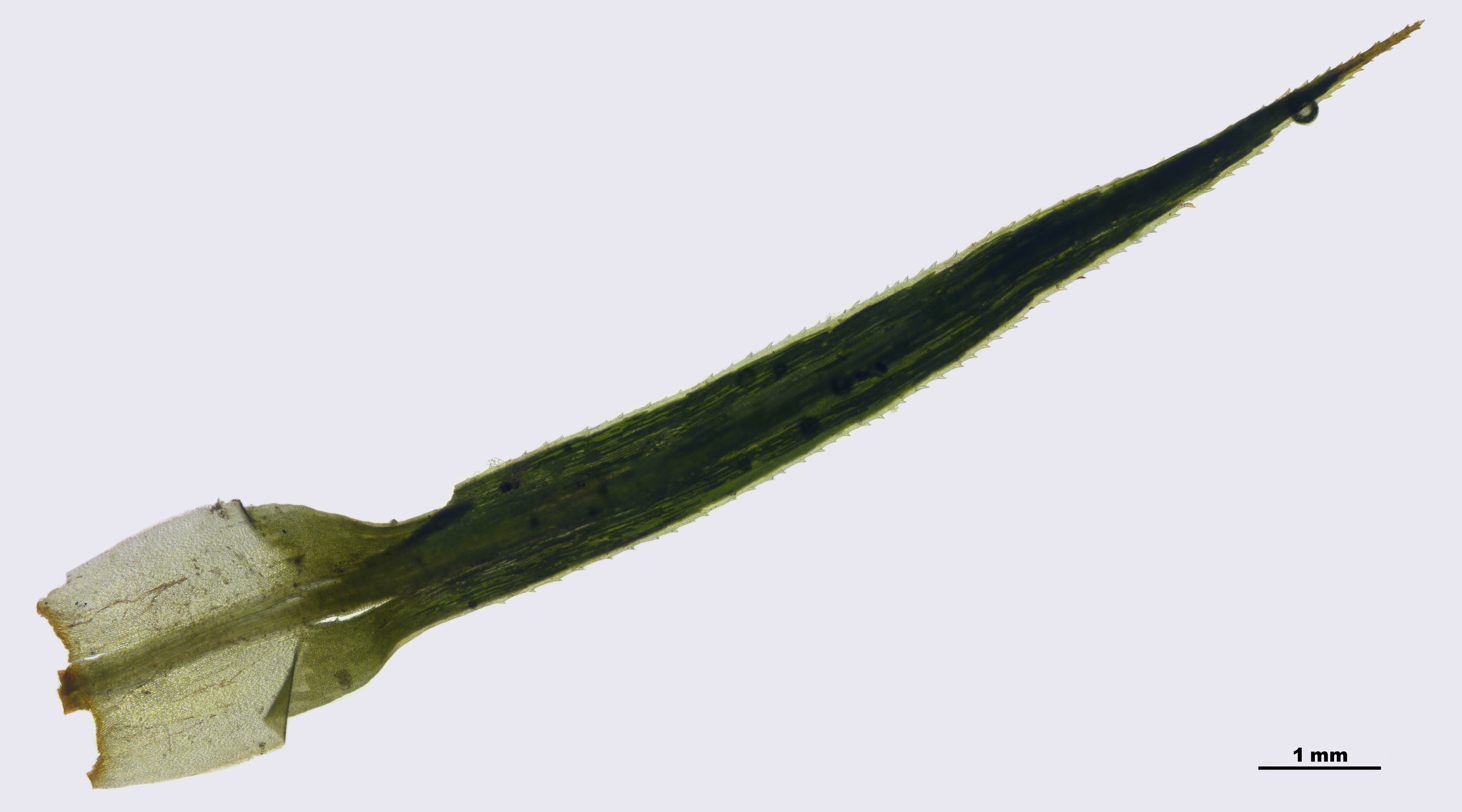
Ventral surface of a leaf from P. formosum.

The leaves of Polytrichastrum formosum are linear-lanceolate, and are usually 6 to 8 mm in length, but can be up to 12 mm long. They are erect to spreading when the moss is dry but become broadly recurved when moist. The leaves have a toothed margin and a prominent costa, where guide cells help conduct water throughout the leaf, and stereids on the dorsal side provide protection.

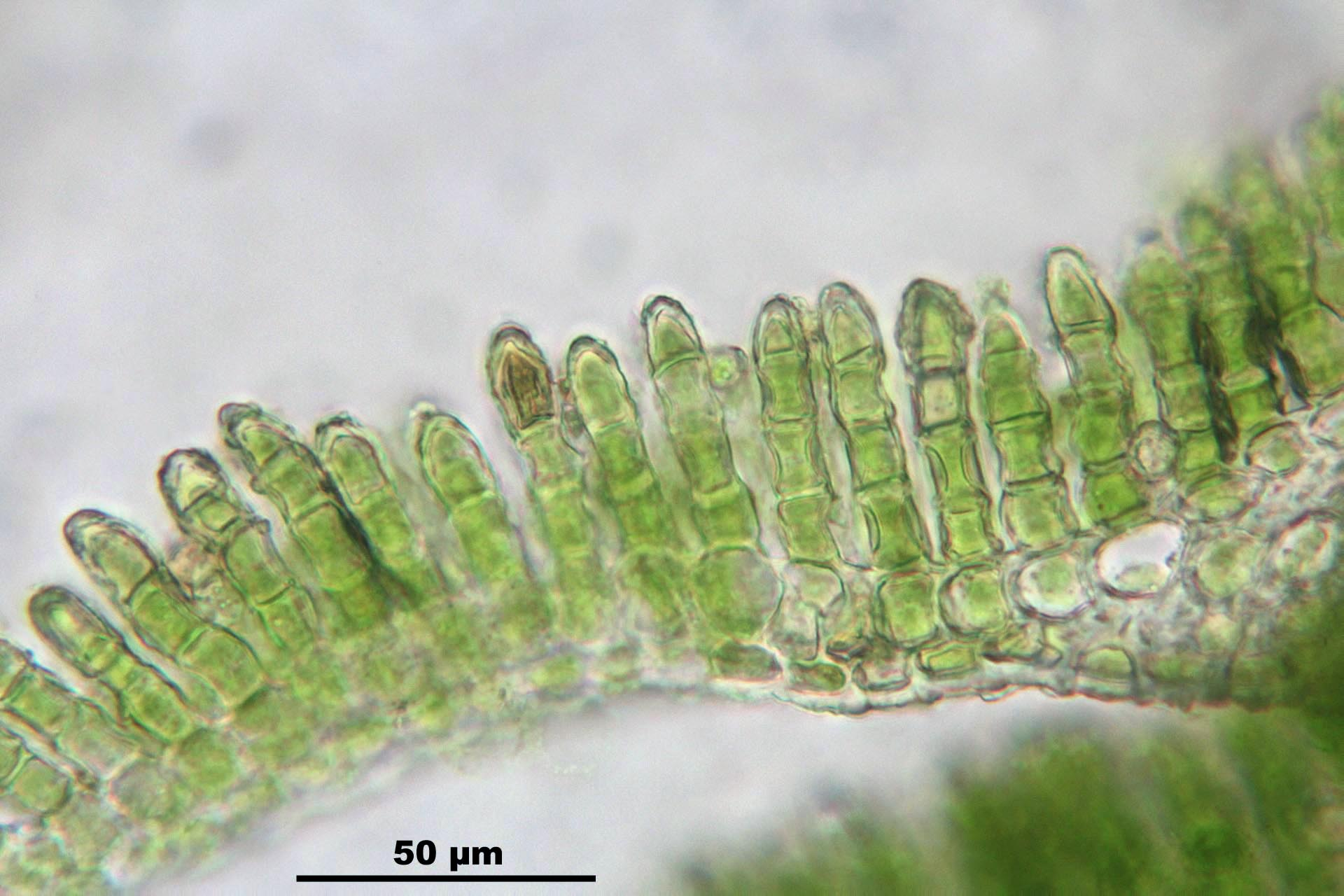
Cross-section of P. formosum leaf, revealing photosynthetic lamellae.

Using a microscope, photosynthetic lamellae are visible in cross section, nearly covering the entire ventral surface of the leaf. A feature unique to Polytrichaceae, lamellae are often compared to the mesophyll of vascular plants due to their role in photosynthesis. Each lamella stands 3 to 7 cells high and the cells at the top are smooth and oblong. Lamellae help increase desiccation tolerance and photosynthetic efficiency by providing more surface area for light absorption and gas exchange. The lamellae are covered by a layer of hydrophobic wax that protects the air spaces between neighbouring lamella from being flooded with water, which would impede CO_{2} uptake necessary for photosynthesis. In this way, P. formosum is able withstand high irradiance better than other mosses.

== Sporophyte ==
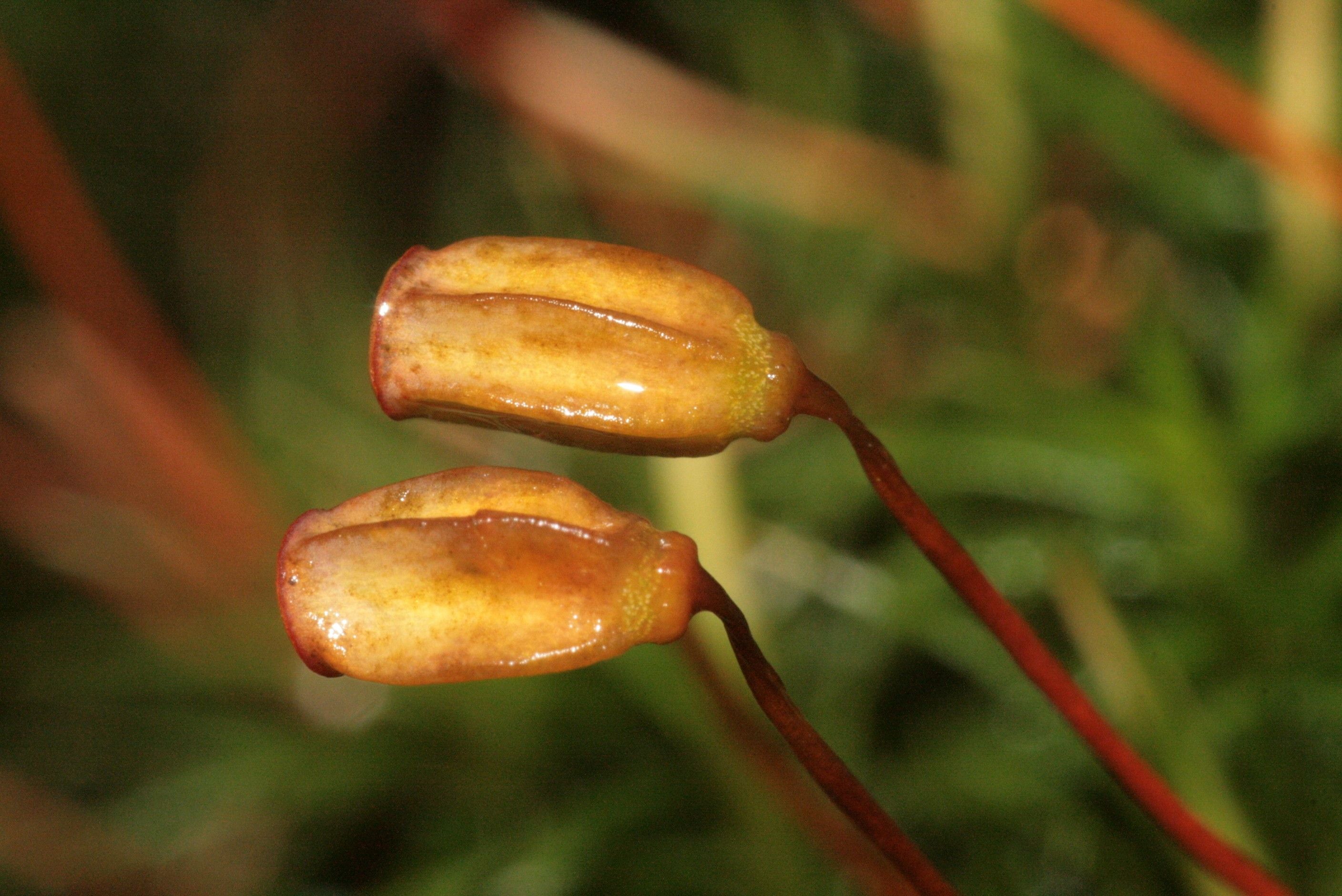
P. formosum angled sporophyte capsules (calyptra absent).

The diploid sporophyte generation of P. formosum matures in early summer and is short-lived. The solitary sporophyte grows out of the female gametophyte, relying on it for energy and nutrients. It is anchored to the gametophyte by a foot, and has a stalk (seta) elevating a capsule (sporangia) in which spores will develop via meiosis. The seta is yellowish to reddish brown and is 3 to 6 cm tall. Like the stem of the gametophyte, the seta has a hydrome and leptome for conducting water and sugars from the gametophyte. The slender and short-rectangular capsule is ochre to brown and 4 to 7 mm long. The capsule is terete or 4-6 angled, which distinguishes Polytrichastrum species from Polytrichum species. In the early stages of growth the capsule is covered by a hairy calyptra that protects the capsule during development and influences it's shape. At maturity, the calyptra falls off to reveal a beaked operculum. Like most other moss in Polytrichaceae, under the operculum P. formosom has 64 nematodontous peristome teeth that surround an epiphragm.

== Reproduction ==
=== Sexual reproduction ===
Polytrichastrum formosum is sexually dioicous, meaning the male and female reproductive structures are on separate plants. P. formosum, like all members of the Polytrichaceae family, is an acrocarpous or cushion moss with reproductive structures borne at the terminus of the gametophyte stem. The perichaetial leaves surrounding the archegonia (female reproductive structure) resembles the other stem leaves besides being longer. The antheridia (male reproductive structure) are at the apex of the male gametophyte in a cup-like structure formed by perigonial leaves which are modified stem leaves. Sperm is produced in the antheridia via mitosis, and when mature they are released from the antheridia by raindrops splashing onto the cup. Sperm can be dispersed up to one meter from the male, and if they successfully reach an archegonia, the egg will be fertilized and grow into a diploid sporophyte.

=== Asexual reproduction ===
Asexual reproduction is not extensive in P. formosum, however it occurs on a local scale by the vegetative proliferation of genets.

== Classification ==
=== Varieties ===
- Polytrichastrum formosum var. densifolium (Wilson ex Mitt.) Z. Iwats & Nog. (North American)
- Polytrichastrum formosum var. formosum (Hedw.) G.L. Sm.

=== Taxonomy disagreement ===
When this species was first described by Johann Hedwig in 1801, it was classified as Polytrichum formosum. Upon further analysis it was determined by Gary L. Smith in 1971 that the moss is better described by the Polytrichastrum genus. Polytrichastrum can be distinguished from Polytrichum by sporangial features including multiple-angled capsules (more than 4 sided), elongated peristome teeth surrounding the ridged epiphragm, and larger spores. According to several sources, Polytrichastrum formosum remains the most accurate taxonomic classification. However, more recent molecular data and phylogenetic analysis suggests that P. formosum should be reverted to its original genus: Polytrichum. Their study suggested that species in Polytrichastrum and Polytrichum are in fact distantly related, but because the Polytrichastrum genus is polyphyletic, authors suggested that some species, including P. formosum, return to the Polytrichum genus. Currently, these names remain synonyms.
