= Polytrichadelphus mitis =

Scientific classification
- Kingdom: Plantae
- Division: Bryophyta
- Class: Polytrichopsida
- Order: Polytrichales
- Family: Polytrichaceae
- Genus: Polytrichadelphus
- Species: P. mitis

Binomial name
- Polytrichadelphus mitis Herzog

Species of moss

Polytrichadelphus mitis is a species of moss first discovered by Theodor Carl Karl Julius Herzog in 1927. No sub-species are listed in Catalogue of Life.
