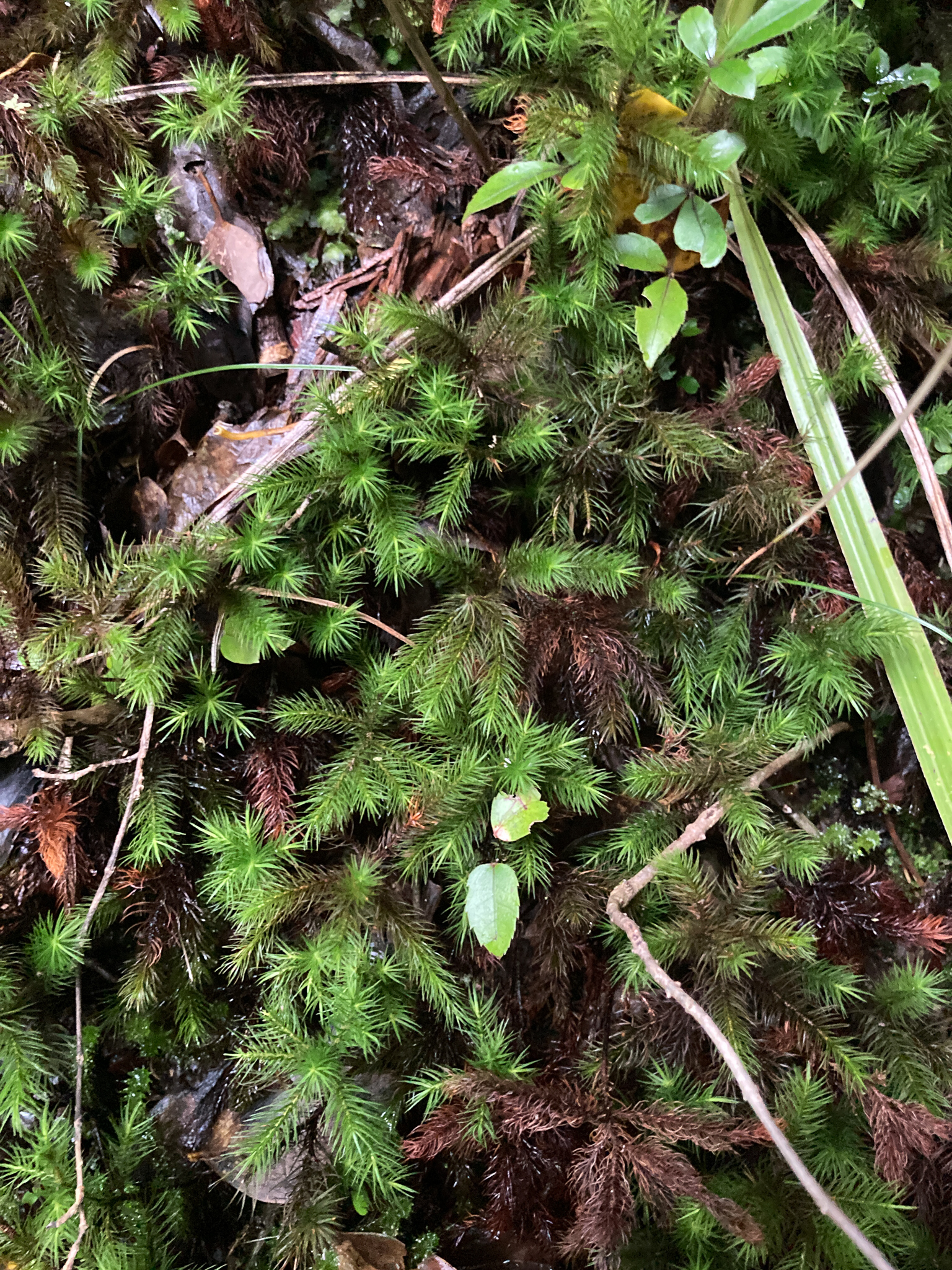
- Dendroligotrichum tongariroense in Tongariro National Park

Scientific classification
- Kingdom: Plantae
- Division: Bryophyta
- Class: Polytrichopsida
- Order: Polytrichales
- Family: Polytrichaceae
- Genus: Dendroligotrichum
- Species: D. tongariroense

Binomial name
- Dendroligotrichum tongariroense (Colenso) Tangney

= Dendroligotrichum tongariroense =

Species of moss

Dendroligotrichum tongariroense is a species of moss, endemic to New Zealand. It is one of the taller mosses in New Zealand, and grows across both main islands and the Auckland Islands.

Dendroligotrichum tongariroense was named in 1888 by William Colenso, but considered as one of the subspecies of a South American Dendroligotrichum until genetic studies showed it was distinct, after which it was described formally in 2011.

== Description ==
Dendroligotrichum tongariroense is a dense, tall moss, growing around 20cm, but sometimes up to 40cm tall. The stalks have a stiff hypodermal sterome, allowing the moss to grow as tall as it does as if it was a woody plant. The top of the moss splits into multiple fronds, with each bearing their thick leaves, resembling a star pattern. These branches have broad sheaths on the base, and the leaves have marginate teeth and thin lamina. The moss holds water through cohesion, as the water sticks to the narrowly divided leaves between the lamellae, scale-like structures on the leaves.

Dendroligotrichum tongariroense differs from Dendroligotrichum squamosum by having no paired apical cells in the leaf laminae, and from Dendroligotrichum dendroides by having oblong, cylindrical capsules (not flaring), and by being less tall and having a broader sheath on the leaves.

== Range and habitat ==
Dendroligotrichum tongariroense is known from across the main islands of New Zealand. In the South Island, it grows in beech forests, while in the North Island it is found mainly at elevation. There is one specimen that was gathered in the Auckland Islands, and which is now in the New York Botanical Garden Herbarium.

Dendroligotrichum tongariroense does not have a threat classification in the NZTCS.

== Etymology ==
Tongariroense is named for Mount Tongariro, in the center of the North Island, where the original lectotypes were gathered.

== Taxonomy ==
The moss was originally collected and described briefly by William Colenso, a missionary to New Zealand who collected and described many species, but whose lackadaisical record-keeping has caused confusion for researchers over the years. Dendroligotrichum is composed of three species currently, two of which are in South America. When DNA testing showed that the New Zealand form was distinct, it was originally given the name Dendroligotrichum dendroides. Some researchers still consider Dendroligotrichum tongariroense as a synonym of Dendroligotrichum dendroides. However, Tanley showed that Colenso had already collected and described this species in 1888. The exact holotype is uncertain; there is a note that collection happened by a "Mr Hill, 1887, ash beds, base of Mount Ruapehu, Tongariro Range, altitude 5,400 feet, County of East Taupo." However, no specimens remain of that collection, except a poorly labelled one in the British Museum, which Tanley designated as the lectotype.

There are several other synonyms.
