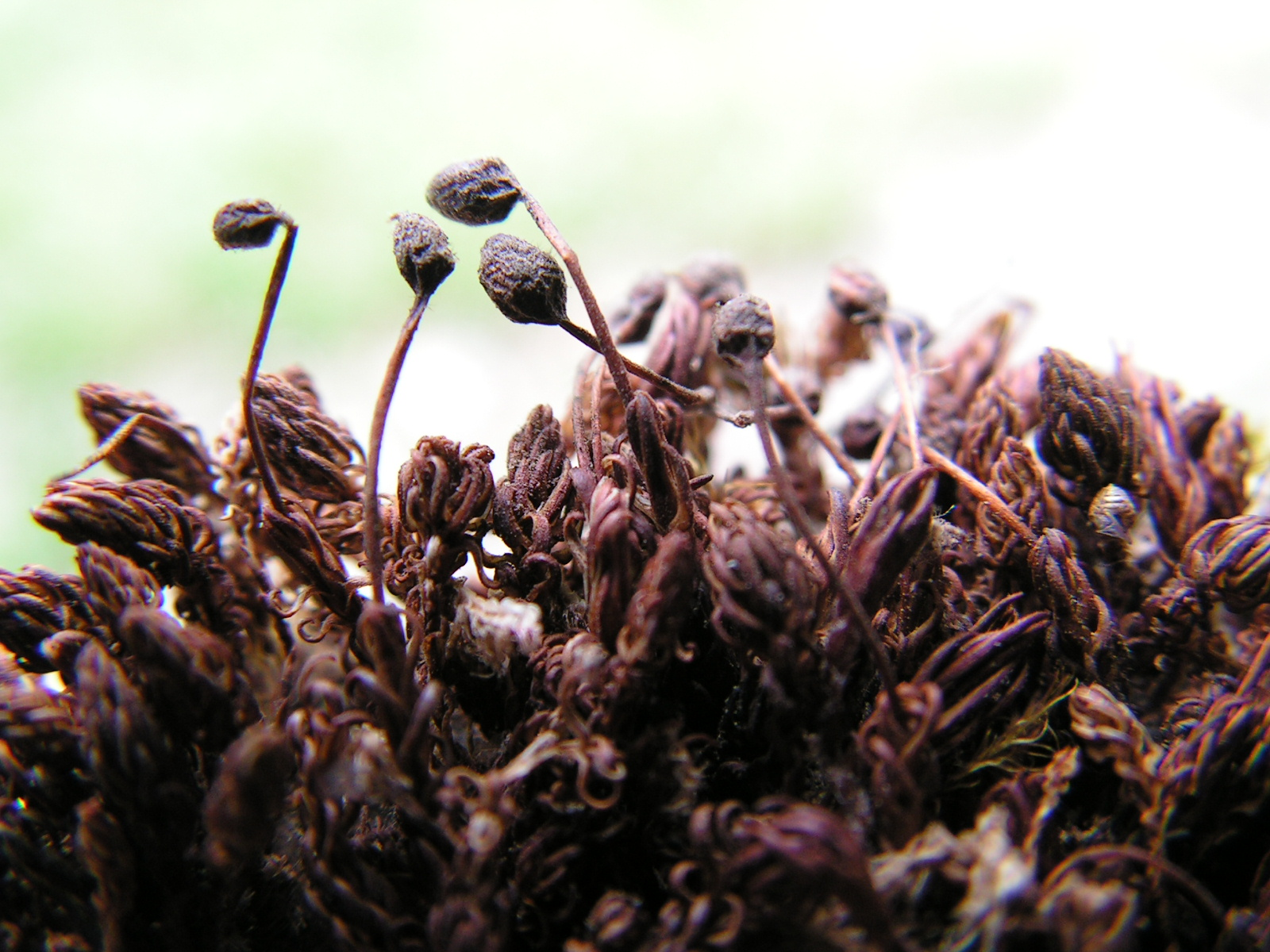

Scientific classification
- Kingdom: Plantae
- Division: Bryophyta
- Class: Polytrichopsida
- Order: Polytrichales
- Family: Polytrichaceae
- Genus: Itatiella; G.L. Sm.
- Species: I. ulei

Binomial name
- Itatiella ulei (Broth. ex Müll. Hal.) G.L. Sm.

= Itatiella =

Genus of mosses

Itatiella ulei is a species of moss in the family Polytrichaceae. It is the only species in the genus Itatiella. The Polytrichaceae is a common family of mosses that does not have close living relatives. Its small size and the inflexed leaf apex characterize Itatiella ulei. When this species grows directly exposed to sun at high elevations, it presents a similar aspect but can be distinguished based on the distal lamella cells which are single and rhombic.

== Description ==
Itatiella ulei is dark green to brown 10-25mm long plant. Just like other moss, this plant divides into two parts, which are sporophyte and gametophyte. The stems are brown, straight and forming tufts. The rhizome is pale-brown and facing down on the ground. Leaves are 2.5-4.0mm long and oblong-lanceolate in shape. This plant has hexagonal-quadratic cells that are thick walled. This plant is dioicous which means gametophytes produce sperm or eggs but never both. The perichaetium that surrounds the archegonia and the base of the seta is terminal and their leaves are long. The perigonium that surrounds the antheridia is also terminal and their leaves are short and broad. Its small size and the inflexed leaf apex characterize Itatiella ulei. This species is growing directly exposed to sun at high elevations present a similar aspect but can be distinguished based on the distal lamella cells which are single and rhombic.

Sporophyte: The sporophytes are common, light brown with globose urns occurring on top of an erect, 5-10mm tall seta. The capsule is erect and symmetrical. The operculum is in a conic form. The operculum is equipped with long rostrate. The peristome teeth are absent so it is known as gymnostomous. The calyptra is hood-shaped and split on one side only, i.e. cucullate.

== Distribution ==
Itatiella ulei is endemic to southeastern and southern Brazil. It can be found in some areas in the states of Espírito Santo, Minas Gerais, Paraná, Rio de Janeiro and São Paulo. The last one that it was found was in upper montane forests above 5,000 feet in elevation.

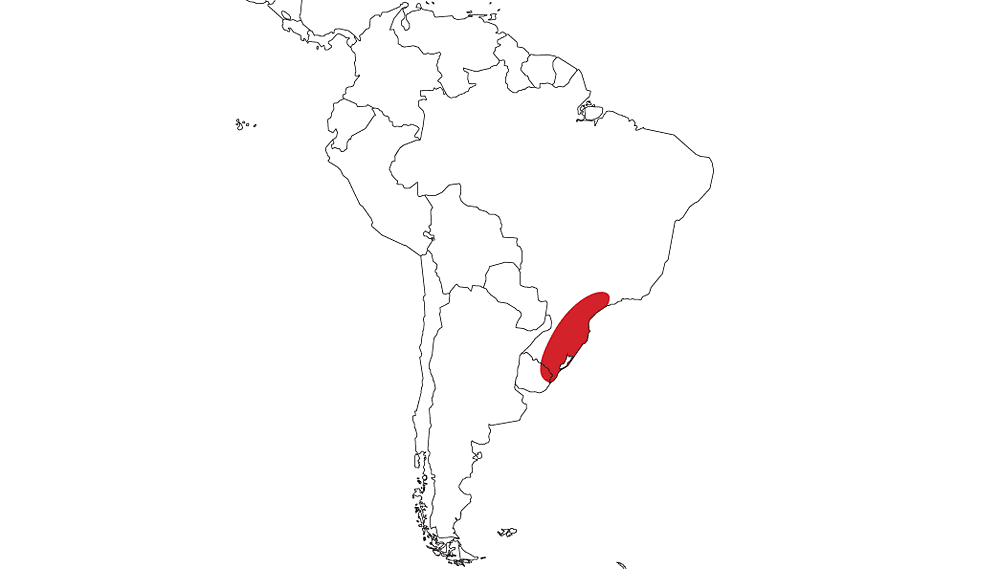
distribution

== Ecology ==
Itatiella ulei can be found in growing on the soil at the margins of montane forest and high campos in the Bioma Mata Atlântica, between 900 and 2,890 m alt.
