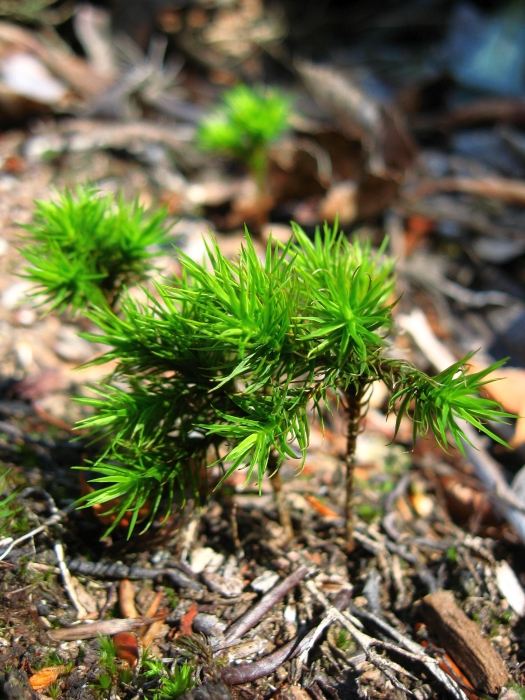
- Dendroligotrichum dendroides near Puerto Varas, Chile.

Scientific classification
- Kingdom: Plantae
- Division: Bryophyta
- Class: Polytrichopsida
- Order: Polytrichales
- Family: Polytrichaceae
- Genus: Dendroligotrichum (Müll.Hal.) Broth.

= Dendroligotrichum =

Genus of mosses

Dendroligotrichum is a genus of mosses belonging to the family Polytrichaceae.

Species:

- Dendroligotrichum dendroides (Brid. ex Hedw.) Broth.
- Dendroligotrichum squamosum (Hook.f. & Wilson) Broth. ex Cardot
- Dendroligotrichum tongariroense (Colenso) Tangney
