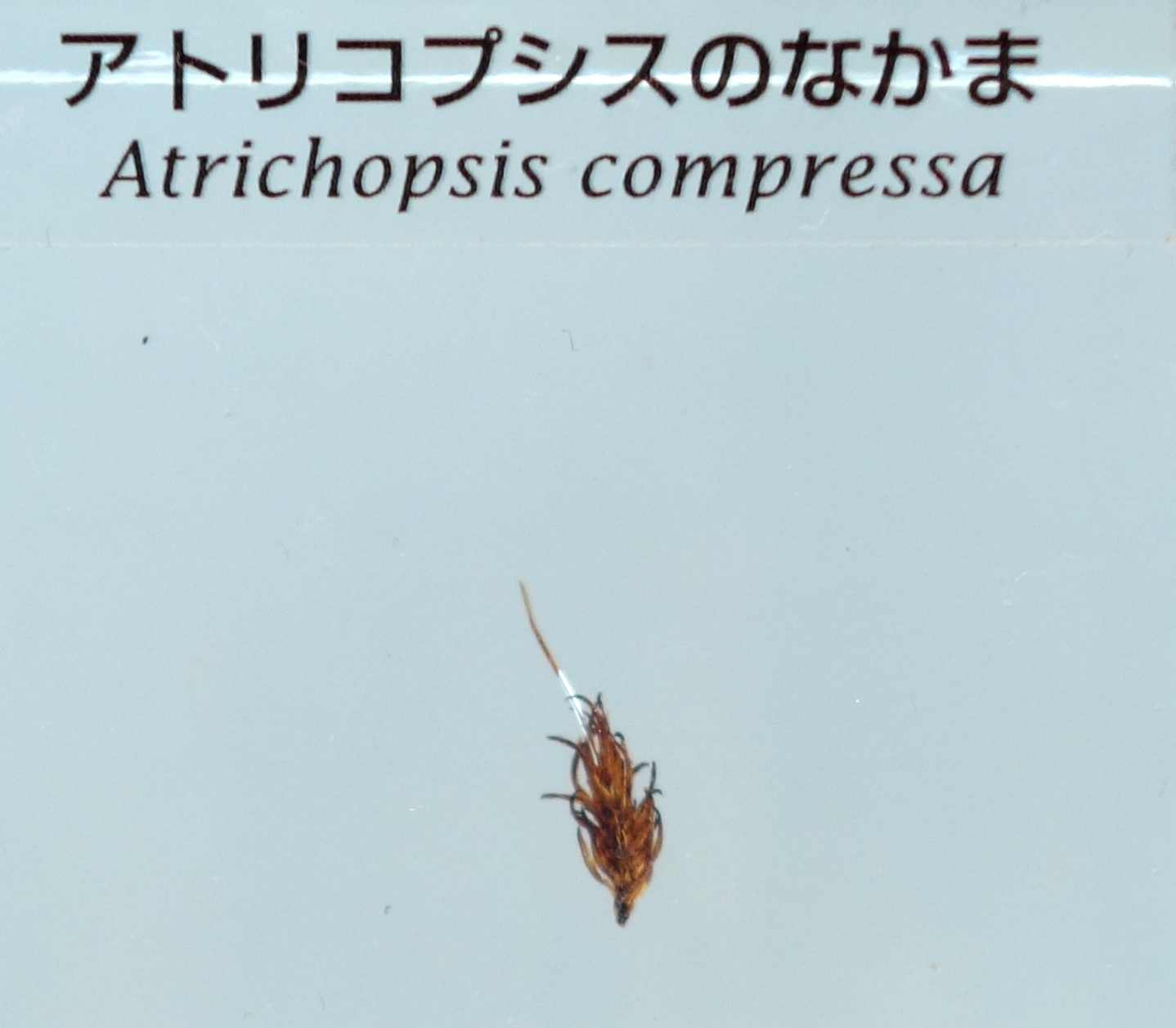

Scientific classification
- Kingdom: Plantae
- Division: Bryophyta
- Class: Polytrichopsida
- Order: Polytrichales
- Family: Polytrichaceae
- Genus: Atrichopsis; Cardot

= Atrichopsis =

Genus of mosses

Atrichopsis is a genus of mosses belonging to the family Polytrichaceae.

The genus was first described by Jules Cardot.

Species:

- Atrichopsis angulata (Cardot & Broth.) N.E.Bell & Hyvönen
- Atrichopsis australis (Hook.f. & Wilson) N.E.Bell & Hyvönen
- Atrichopsis bellii (Broth.) N.E.Bell & Hyvönen
- Atrichopsis capensis Schelpe & N.C.Fanshawe ex van Rooy, N.E.Bell & Hyvönen
- Atrichopsis compressa (Hook.f. & Wilson) G.L.Sm.
- Atrichopsis crispula (Hook.f. & Wilson) N.E.Bell & Hyvönen
- Atrichopsis erosa (Hampe) N.E.Bell & Hyvönen
- Atrichopsis laxifolia (Dixon) N.E.Bell & Hyvönen
- Atrichopsis mexicana (G.L.Sm.) N.E.Bell & Hyvönen
- Atrichopsis minima (Cardot) N.E.Bell & Hyvönen
- Atrichopsis tapes (Müll.Hal.) N.E.Bell & Hyvönen
- Atrichopsis tenuirostris (Hook.) N.E.Bell & Hyvönen
- Atrichopsis tetragona Schelpe & N.C.Fanshawe ex van Rooy, N.E.Bell & Hyvönen
- Atrichopsis trichodon (Hook.f. & Wilson) N.E.Bell & Hyvönen
- Atrichopsis tristaniensis (Dixon) N.E.Bell & Hyvönen
