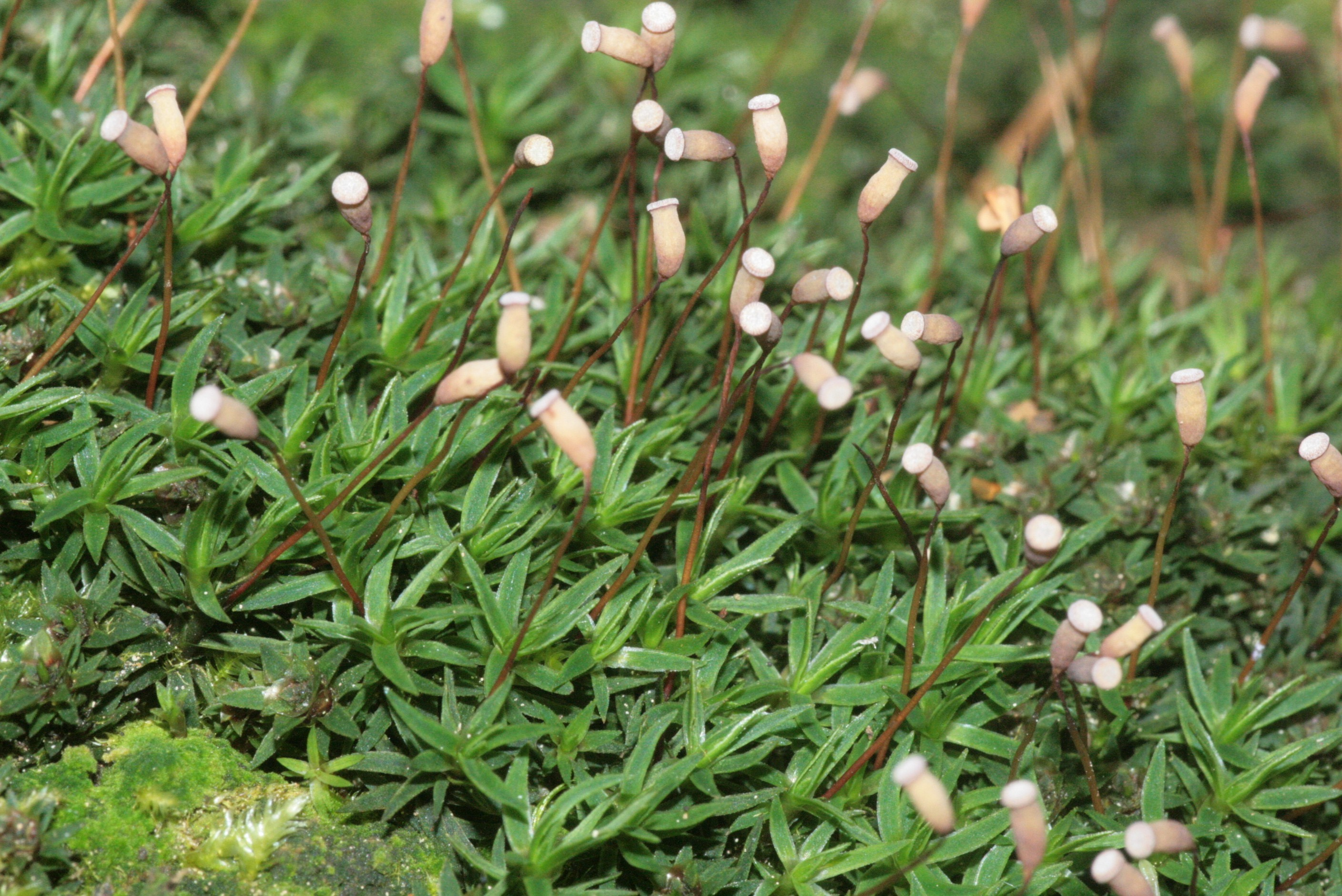
- Pogonatum aloides

Scientific classification
- Kingdom: Plantae
- Division: Bryophyta
- Class: Polytrichopsida
- Order: Polytrichales
- Family: Polytrichaceae
- Genus: Pogonatum; P.Beauv.

= Pogonatum =

Genus of mosses

Pogonatum is a genus of mosses — commonly called spike moss — which contains approximately 70 species that cover a cosmopolitan distribution. It can be seen mostly in Asian countries with a tropical climate.

== Species ==
There are about 156 species known in all, 9 in North America.

- Pogonatum subflexuosum - (Lorentz) Broth.
- Pogonatum subfuscatum - Broth.
- Pogonatum subgracile - (Hampe) Besch.
- Pogonatum subtortile - (Müll. Hal.) A. Jaeger
- Pogonatum subulatum - (Menzies ex Brid.) Brid.
- Pogonatum tahitense - Schimp.
- Pogonatum thelicarpum - (Müll. Hal.)
- Pogonatum tolucense - (Hampe) Besch.
- Pogonatum tortile - (Sw.) Brid.
- Pogonatum tortipes - (Wilson ex Mitt.) A. Jaeger
- Pogonatum tubulosum - Dixon
- Pogonatum undulatum - (Hedw.)
- Pogonatum urnigerum - (Hedw.) P. Beauv.
- Pogonatum usambaricum - (Broth.)
- Pogonatum vanhoeffenii - (Kindb.)
- Pogonatum volvatum - (Müll. Hal.)
