= Leptoid =

Food-conducting cell type of some mosses

A leptoid is a type of elongated food-conducting cell like phloem in the stems of some mosses, such as the family Polytrichaceae. They surround strands of water-conducting hydroids. They have some structural and developmental similarities to the sieve elements of seedless vascular plants. At maturity they have inclined end cell walls with small pores and degenerate nuclei. The conduction cells of mosses, leptoids and hydroids, appear similar to those of fossil protracheophytes. However they're not thought to represent an intermediate stage in the evolution of plant vascular tissues but to have had an independent evolutionary origin.

== See also ==
- Hydroid, a related water-transporting cell analogous the xylem of vascular plants
