= Macarorchestia martini =

Conservation status
- Critically Endangered (IUCN 3.1)

Scientific classification
- Kingdom: Animalia
- Phylum: Arthropoda
- Class: Malacostraca
- Order: Amphipoda
- Family: Talitridae
- Genus: Macarorchestia
- Species: M. martini

Binomial name
- Macarorchestia martini Stock, 1989

Species of crustacean

Macarorchestia martini is a species of beach hopper in the family Talitridae endemic to the Azores.
