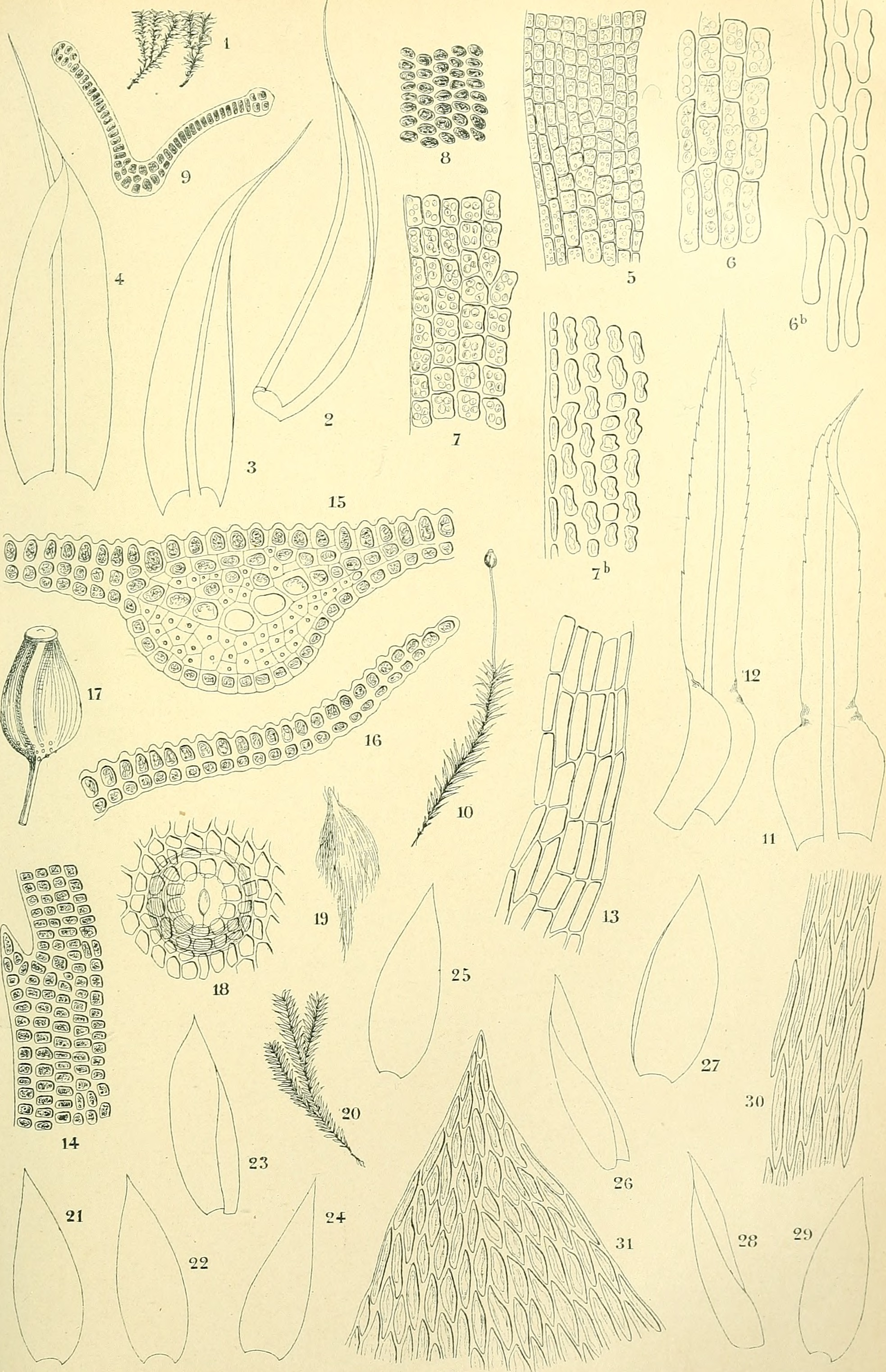
- Alophosia. Bulletin de l'Herbier Boissier (1893-1908).

Scientific classification
- Kingdom: Plantae
- Division: Bryophyta
- Class: Polytrichopsida
- Order: Polytrichales
- Family: Polytrichaceae
- Genus: Alophosia; Cardot
- Species: A. azorica

Binomial name
- Alophosia azorica (Renauld & Cardot) Cardot

= Alophosia =

Genus of mosses

Alophosia is a genus of mosses belonging to the family Polytrichaceae. The only species is Alophosia azorica.

The genus was first described by Jules Cardot.
