= Hydroid (botany) =

Type of vascular cell in some plants

A hydroid is a type of vascular cell that occurs in certain bryophytes. In some mosses such as members of the Polytrichaceae family, hydroids form the innermost layer of cells in the stem. At maturity they are long, colourless, thin walled cells of small diameter, containing water but no living protoplasm. Collectively, hydroids function as a conducting tissue, known as the hydrome, transporting water and minerals drawn from the soil. They are surrounded by bundles of living cells known as leptoids which carry sugars and other nutrients in solution. The hydroids are analogous to the tracheids of vascular plants but there is no lignin present in the cell walls to provide structural support.

Hydroids have been found in some fossilised plants from the Rhynie chert, including Aglaophyton, where they were initially mistaken for xylem tracheids.

== See also ==
- Leptoid, a related sucrose-transporting vessel analogous to the phloem of vascular plants
