= Algar do Carvão =

Ancient lava tube of the Azores

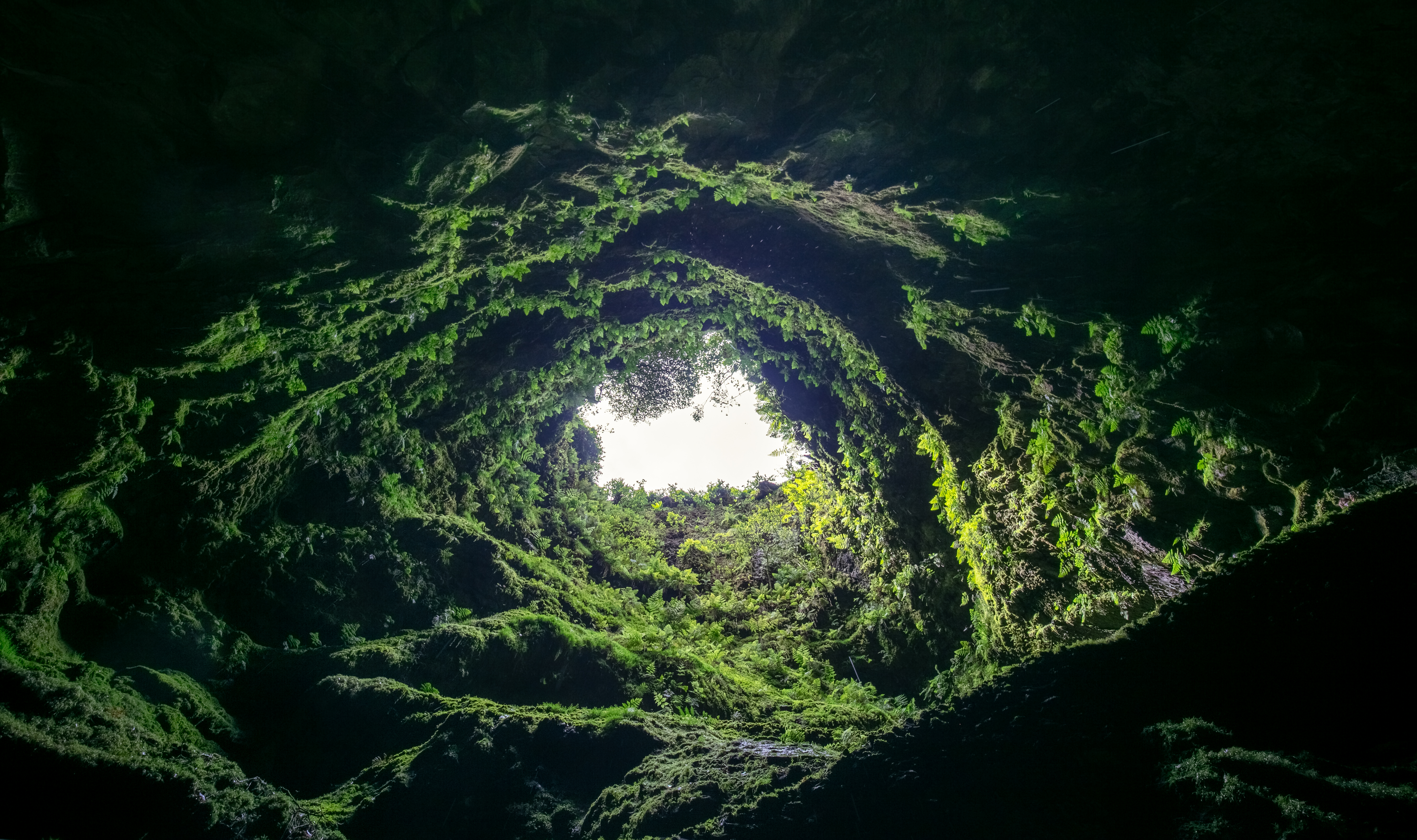
- View through the Boca do Algar (Mouth of the Cavern)

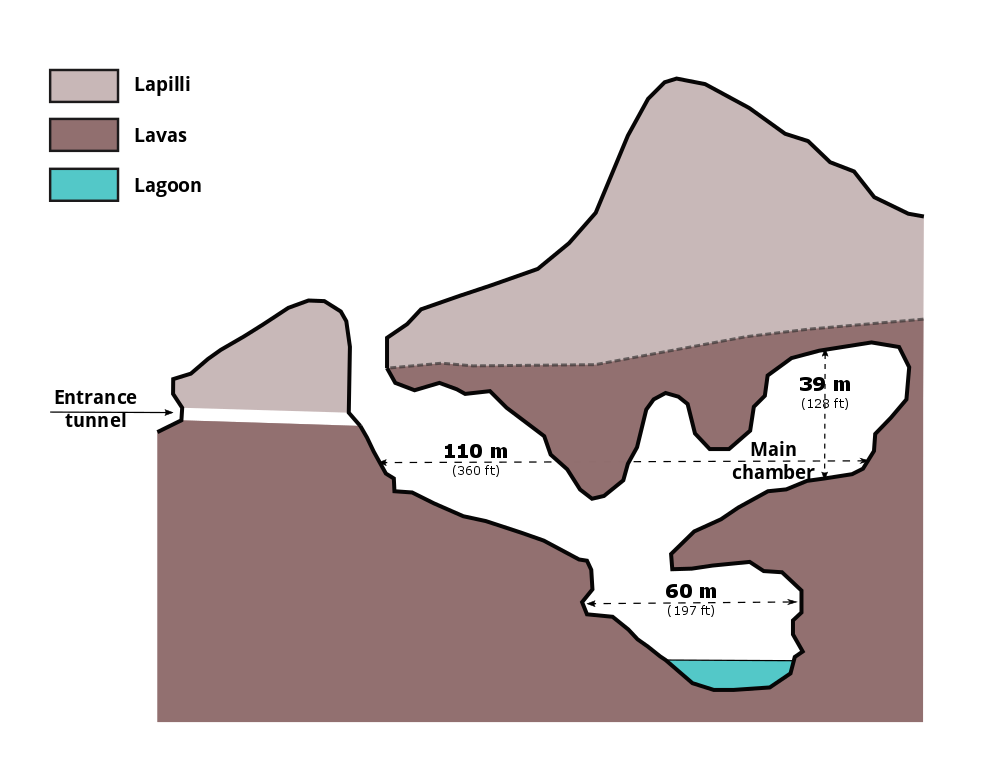
- Profile of the Algar do Carvão with entrance, chamber and lagoon
- Location: Terceira Island (Azores), Portugal
- Coordinates: 38°43′44″N 27°11′7″W
- Depth: 90 metres (300 ft)
- Length: 100 metres (330 ft)
- Discovery: 26 January 1893
- Geology: Lava tube, Basalt
- Entrances: 1
- Access: Tours are available in season

The Algar do Carvão (Cavern of Coal) is an ancient lava tube or volcanic vent located in the central part of the island of Terceira in the Portuguese archipelago of the Azores. It lies within the civil parish of Porto Judeu in the municipality of Angra do Heroísmo.

== History ==
The existence of the cavern had been known for a long time, but the depth and lack of ambient light, made any descent difficult, owing to the vertical descent, and delayed any real exploration.

On 26 January 1893, the first descent, "...with the use of a simple rope, was accomplished by Cândido Corvelo and Luis Sequeira."

The second descent was made in 1934, by Didier Couto, who produced the first rough map of the interior. This drawing, based on visual observations alone (rather than measurements), turned out to be quite accurate.

On 18 August 1963, a group of enthusiasts organized a descent using a "chair" platform suspended on a nylon line and, later, a harness.

With the advent of portable lighting systems, it was possible to re-examine the observations first-hand, including the most remote and narrow sections of the cavern. The site was open to the public in the late 20th century, through weekly organized tours (except weekends and holidays) through the summer (from May to September). Access to the site is also possible through the Montanheiros (Mountaineers) organization, the group responsible for matters associated with the Algar.

=== Toponymy ===
The word, algar, is a Portuguese word that denotes a natural cavity in the earth that, unlike most caves or caverns, is more vertical in its orientation, like a well. The Portuguese word derives from the Arabic word, al-Gar, which means "the crease", while Carvão means "coal" in Portuguese. The Algar do Carvão is not a source of coal, and the term carvão has also been used in the Portuguese vernacular akin to "blackened", "sooty" or "burnt", referring to the dark composition of the rocks.

== Geography ==
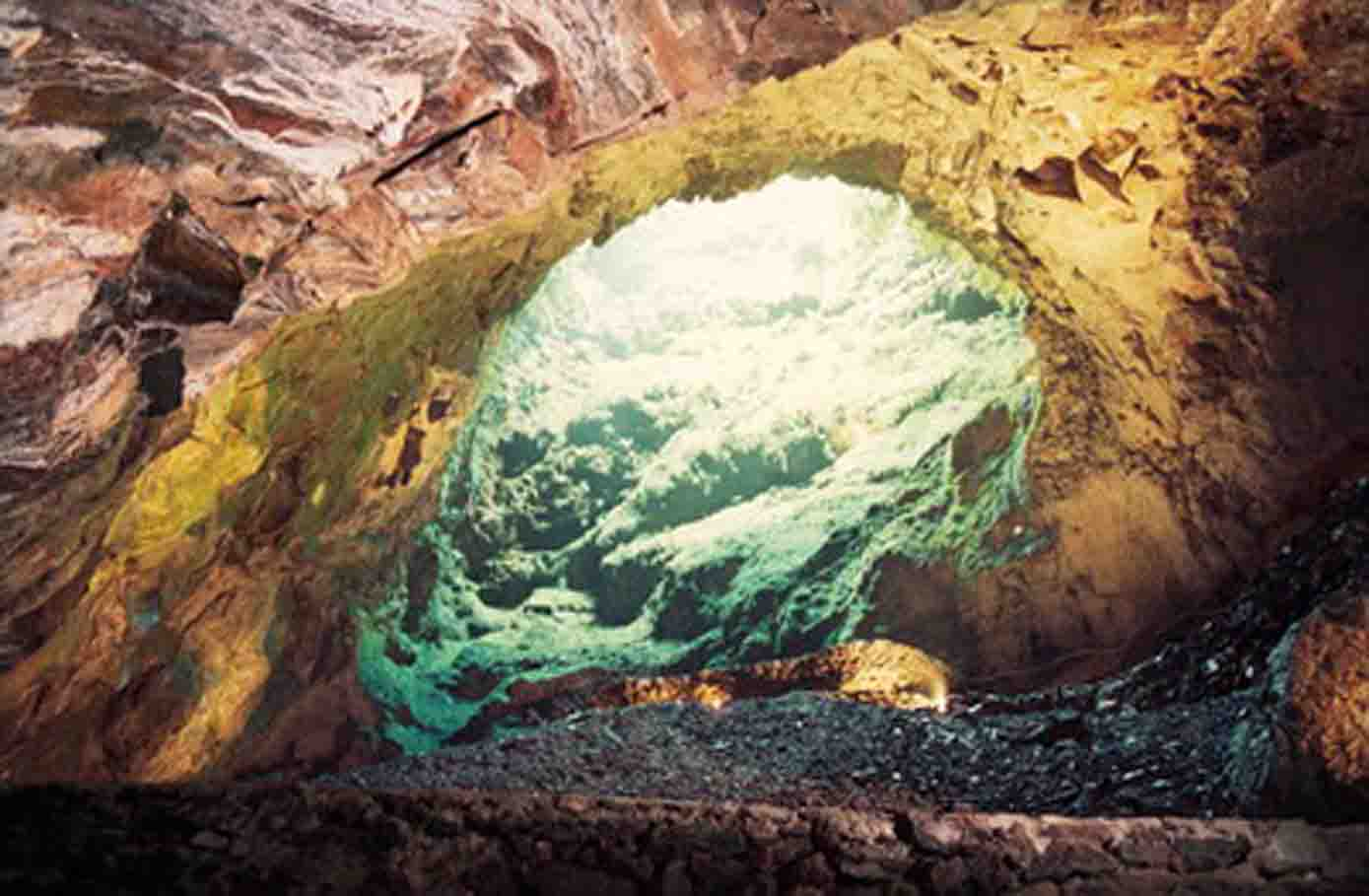
Main entrance to the cavern, as seen from with the cave

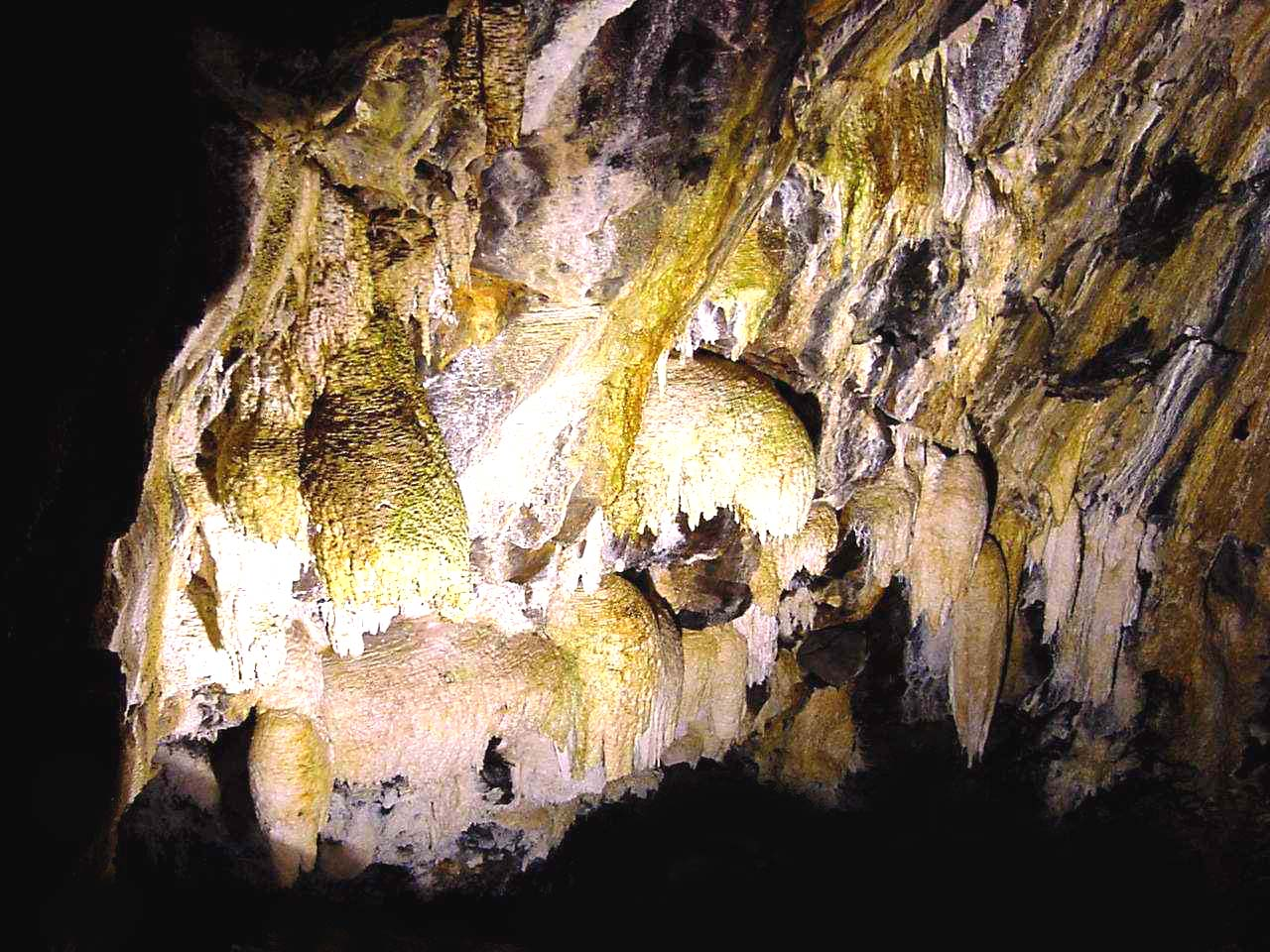
Stalactites in the Algar do Carvão

Terceira is the site of four large volcanoes (Pico Alto, Santa Bárbara, Guilherme Moniz, and Cinco Picos) grouped along a basaltic fissure zone that transects the island from northwest to southeast. The Algar do Carvão is directly associated with the caldera of the Guilherme Moniz volcano, but it is part of the same complex as Santa Barbara to the west, Pico Alto to the north, and Guilherme Moniz, which is a short distance to the south of the Algar do Carvão site. Algar do Carvão is situated at 583 metres (1,913 ft) above sea level.

The 40.5 hectares (4,360,000 ft^{2}) extent was classified as a Regional National Monument (Portuguese: Monumento Natural Regional) due to its peculiar volcanological characteristics, in addition to its environmental ecosystem. The mouth of the Algar consists of a 45 metres (148 ft) vertical passage to the interior, that reaches a ramp of debris and gravel. From here there is another decline to the clear waters of the interior pool, approximately 90 metres (300 ft) from the level surface. The pool is supported by rainwater, and can reach as deep as 15 metres (49 ft) depth or become dry in summer months, owing to little or no precipitation.

The cave itself is remarkable for the unique mineralogical characteristics of its silicate stalactites.

=== Biome ===
The Algar is populated by a rich plant tapestry, that covers the mouth of the cone structure, including various endemic species. Furthermore, there are several invertebrate species that make the cavern their homes, such as the cavernous spider Turinyphia cavernicola and other species of Troglofauna, like the centipede Lithobius obscurus azorae, the springtail Pseudosinella ashmoleorum and ground beetle Trechus terceiranus. Finally, there is a distinct presence of various moss, including those on the Red Data Book of European Bryophytes (ECCB), like the Alophosia azorica and Calypogeia azorica, among others.
