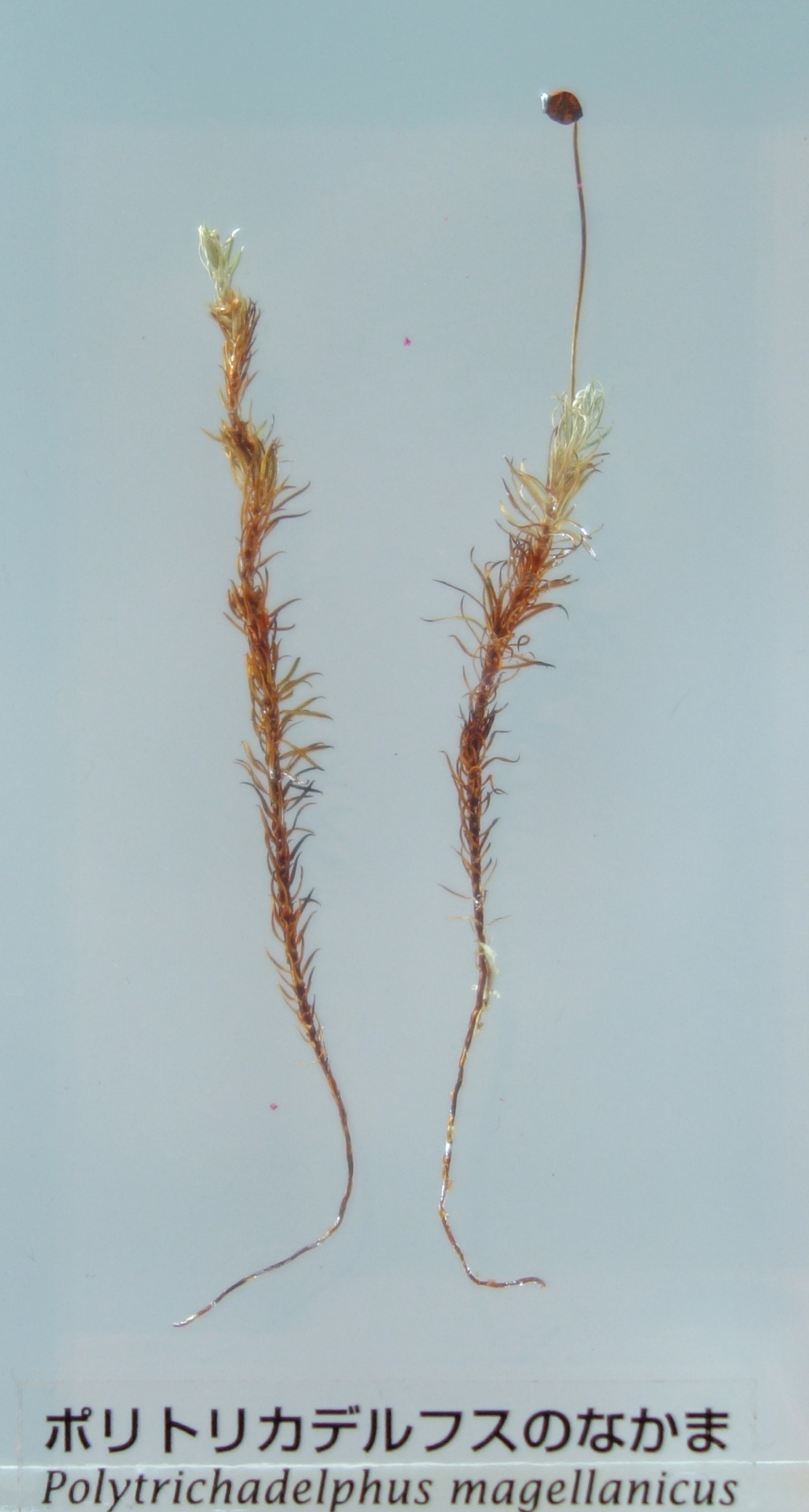
- Polytrichadelphus magellanicus

Scientific classification
- Kingdom: Plantae
- Division: Bryophyta
- Class: Polytrichopsida
- Order: Polytrichales
- Family: Polytrichaceae
- Genus: Polytrichadelphus (Müll.Hal.) Mitt.

= Polytrichadelphus =

Genus of mosses

Polytrichadelphus is a genus of mosses belonging to the family Polytrichaceae.

The species of this genus are found in Australia and America.

Species:

- Polytrichadelphus abriaquiae Jaeger, 1880
- Polytrichadelphus archboldii E.B.Bartram, 1942
- Polytrichadelphus magellanicus (Hedw.) Mitt.
