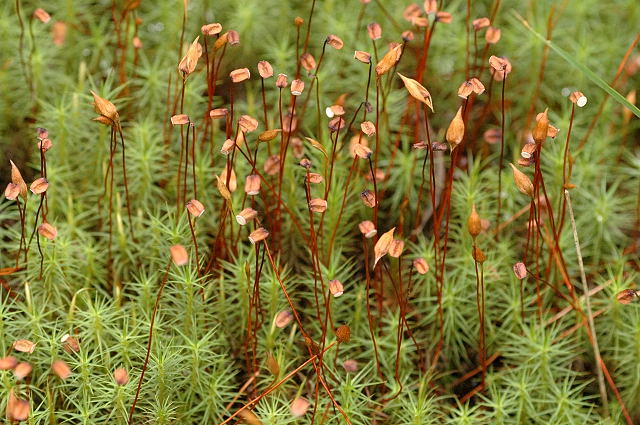
- Polytrichum commune

Scientific classification
- Kingdom: Plantae
- Division: Bryophyta
- Class: Polytrichopsida; Doweld
- Order: Polytrichales; M. Fleisch.
- Family: Polytrichaceae; Schwägr.

Genera
- See text.

= Polytrichaceae =

Polytrichaceae Temporal range: Valanginian–Recent

Family of mosses

Polytrichaceae is a common family of mosses. Members of this family tend to be larger than other mosses, with the larger species occurring in particularly moist habitats. The leaves have specialized sheaths at the base and a midrib that bears photosynthetic lamellae on the upper surface. These mosses are capable of sustaining high rates of photosynthesis in the presence of ample light and moisture. Unlike all other mosses, the hydroid-based vascular system of these mosses is continuous from stem to leaf and can extract water from the soil through transpiration. Species in this group are dioicous, though some are monoicous. In most species, the sporophytes are relatively large, the setae are rigid, and the calyptrae are hairy. Most species have nematodontous peristomes with 32–64 teeth in their sporangium; some early-diverging genera instead have a stopper mechanism, which consists of the apical section of the columella, that seals the mouth of the capsule shut prior to dehiscence.

== Classification ==
class Polytrichopsida

order Polytrichales

family Polytrichaceae

multiple genera

- - Takakiopsida
  - Sphagnopsida
  - - - Andreaeopsida
      - Andreaeobryopsida
      - - Oedipodiopsida
        - - Tetraphidopsida
          - Polytrichaceae
          - Bryopsida

The phylogenetic position of the Polytrichaceae among the eight classes of mosses, based on inferences from DNA sequence data.

=== Genera ===
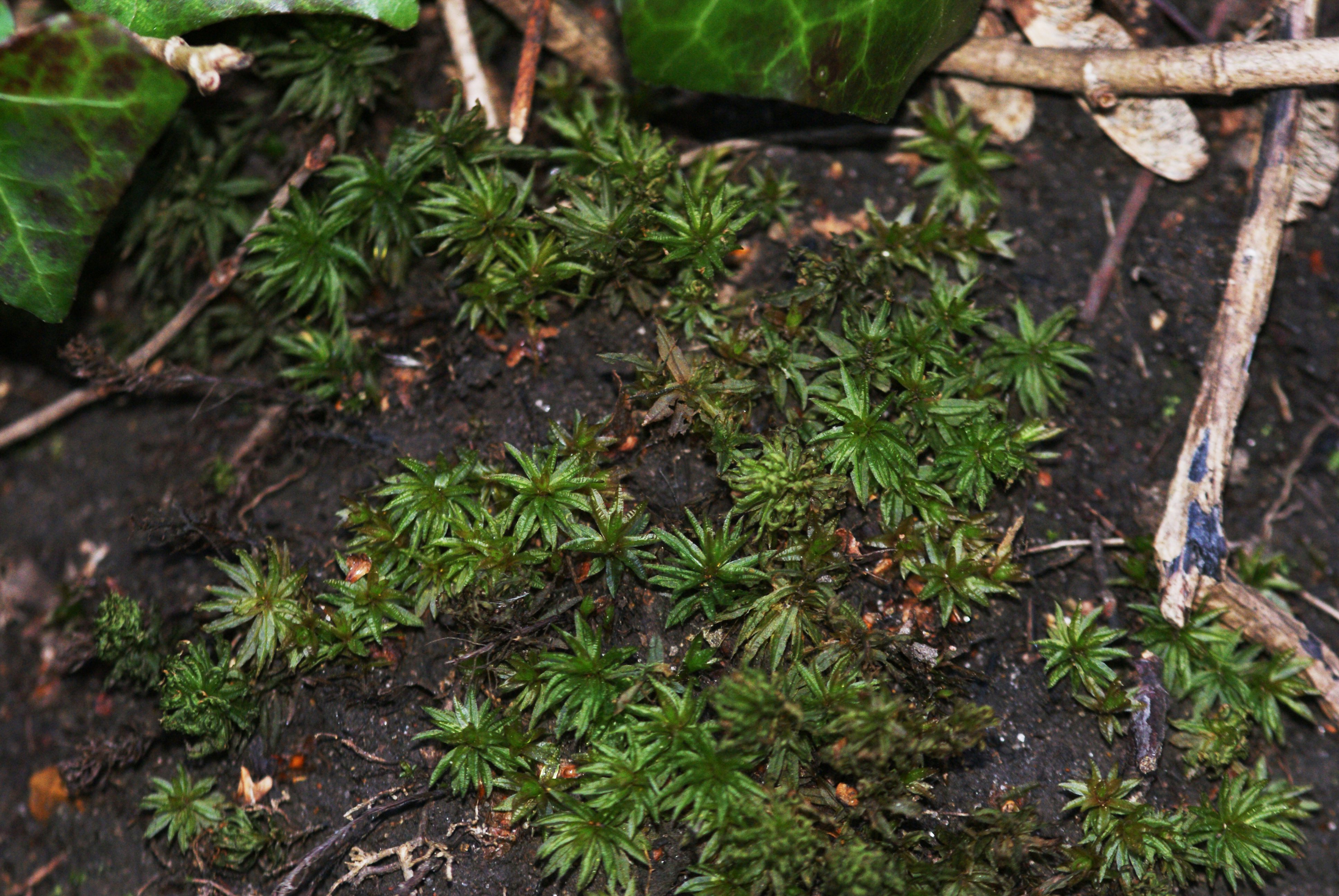
Atrichum undulatum

- Alophosia
- Atrichopsis
- Atrichum
- Bartramiopsis
- Dawsonia
- Dendroligotrichum
- Hebantia
- Itatiella
- Lyellia
- Meiotrichum
- Notoligotrichum
- Oligotrichum
- Plagioracelopus
- Pogonatum
- Polytrichadelphus
- Polytrichastrum
- Polytrichum
- Pseudatrichum
- Psilopilum
- Steereobryon

=== Extinct genera ===
- †Eopolytrichum Konopka et al., 1997 Cretaceous (Campanian); Gaillard Formation, Georgia, USA
- †Meantoinea Bippus et al., 2017 Cretaceous (Valanginian); Apple Bay locality, Vancouver Island, British Columbia, Canada
- †Polytrichites Britton, 1926 Miocene; Latah Formation, Washington, USA
