= Ditchburn =

Ditchburn is a surname. Notable people with the surname include:

- Anne Ditchburn (born 1949), Canadian ballet dancer and actress
- Barry Ditchburn, British Grand Prix motorcycle road racer
- David Ditchburn, Scottish historian
- Jim Ditchburn (1908–1964), Australian sportsman in Australian rules football and first-class cricket
- John Ditchburn, Australian cartoonist
- Robert Ditchburn (academic) (1903–1987), English physicist
- Ross Ditchburn (born 1957), former Australian rules footballer
- Ted Ditchburn (1921–2005), English professional football goalkeeper

== See also ==
- Ditchburn & Mare, British shipbuilder founded in 1837
- Ditchburn Boats, manufacturer of wooden pleasure craft launches and racing boats located in Gravenhurst, Ontario on Lake Muskoka
