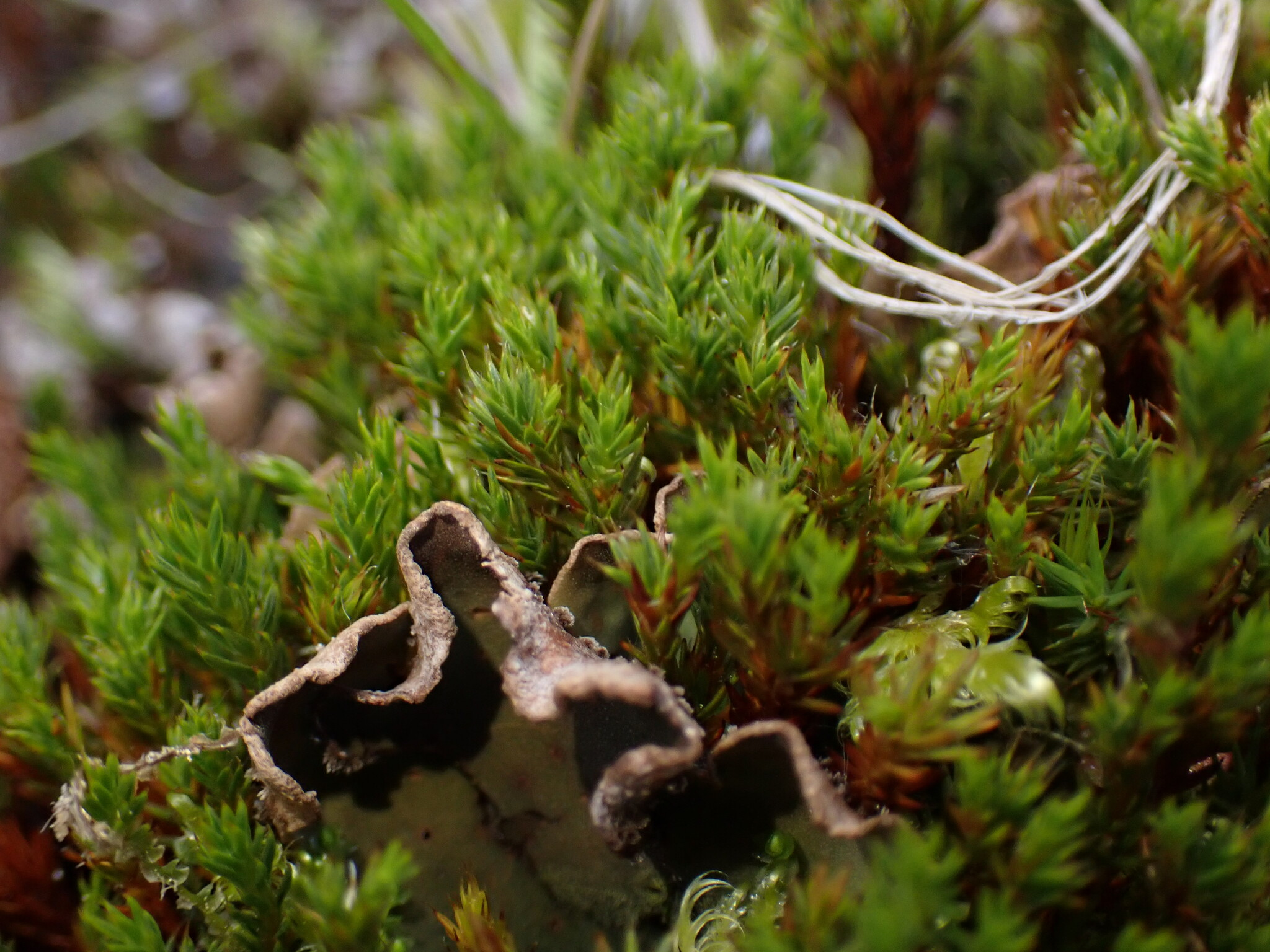

Scientific classification
- Kingdom: Plantae
- Division: Bryophyta
- Class: Polytrichopsida
- Order: Polytrichales
- Family: Polytrichaceae
- Genus: Polytrichum
- Species: P. hyperboreum

Binomial name
- Polytrichum hyperboreum R. Br.

= Polytrichum hyperboreum =

Species of moss

Polytrichum hyperboreum (commonly referred to as Arctic haircap moss) is a species of moss belonging to the genus Polytrichum, commonly found throughout arctic regions of the world. Members of this dioecious species readily produces sporophytes with their sporophytic structure, consisting of a foot, seta, capsule, and a hairy calyptra, similar to other Polytrichum species. Polytrichum hyperboreum is distinguishable by certain unique features of there gametophytic structure that sets them apart from other genus members.

== Distribution and habitat ==
Polytrichum hyperboreum has been found to inhibit arctic regions in North America including Greenland, Yukon, Alaska, Newfoundland and Labrador, Northwest Territories, Nunavut, Quebec, as well as in European and Asian countries such as Norway, Scandinavia and Russia. Ideal habitat for this species consists of acidic soil or sand, dry areas such as tundras or rocky areas, or alongside bodies of water, at elevations of roughly 0–1500 meters.

== Sporophytic features ==
The sporophytic features of P. hyperboreum are common to other members of its genus. Key features that set the Polytrichum genus apart from others, such as light brown nematodontous peristome teeth and a hairy calyptra(hence the common name for the genus "hair-cap mosses"), are found many Polytrichum species, including P. hyperboreum This species is also characterized by its relatively short, reddish setae, which is similar to the setae found on the species Polytrichum commune.

== Gametophytic features ==
Polytrichum hyperboreum has many gametophytic structures common to other members of the Polytrichum genus, however it also has certain unique structures that make this species identifiable from others. The basic structure of this plant that is visible to the naked eye consists of a stem (under 10 cm tall) containing hydroids and leptoids, with whitish rhizoids at the base, as well as a crowding of leaves in the distal portion of the stem. The leaves themselves are costate, with a linear-lanceolate shape and infolded margins. These leaves become erect and tight together when dried, or erect and spread when moist. The species ranges in color from green at youth, to a chestnut brown colour after maturing. One of the most unique characteristics of this plant that is visible in the cross section of the leaf is the laminae. Unlike other species in its genus, P. hyperboreum has marginal laminae that wrap completely around the vertical lamellae of the leaf, completely enclosing them. Other Polytrichum species have both lamellae and laminae, however the laminae are not long enough to enclose the lamellae, leaving them exposed. The most distinct features to this species that sets it apart from other Polytrichum members include the plant's branching pattern, their unique awn, the cells of the lamellae and the overlapping marginal laminae.
