= Cateran Hole =

Cave in Northumberland, England

Coordinates: 55°30′13″N 1°50′17″W

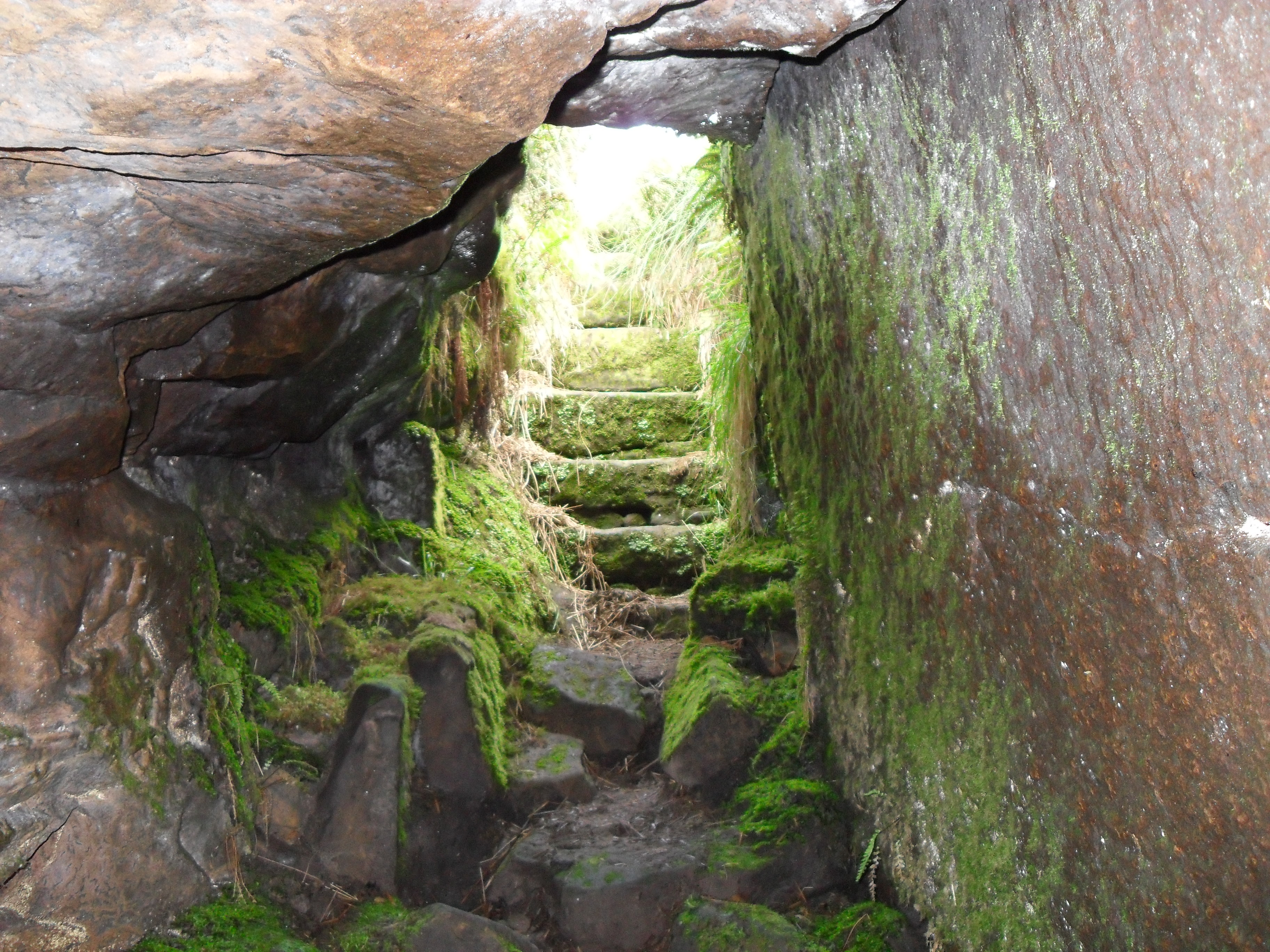
Inside Cateran Hole

Cateran Hole is a circa 35m length cave set in the Gritstone of Cateran Hill in Northumberland. It lies about 4 miles due north of Eglingham, and can be reached by lining up the tall mast behind the farm with the left-hand end of the wood to the side of the Quarry House farm (to the north of the cave), then walking on this bearing.

A shallow crater with cut steps leads down into an easy rift passage which ultimately chokes. After the initial steepness of the steps, the passage is roomy with a slight downward tilt, running between two large planes of Gritstone which close in above. After about 30m a block, protruding downwards from the ceiling, reduces the route to a crawl into a small chamber which is choked by large blocks ahead. This crawl is sandy and often completely dry, although in very wet weather it occasionally sumps. The main fault, however, continues, and it is likely that this cave could be extended by concerted digging (a dangerous activity), although it is difficult to see why this would be done in Gritstone, where there is unlikely to be found any significant lateral development.

Cateran Hole is reputed to have been a smugglers' hiding place, although locals claim that it once linked nearby Chillingham Castle with Hepburn. The latter seems unlikely as it tends in the direction of neither, while the carved stone steps favour the former.

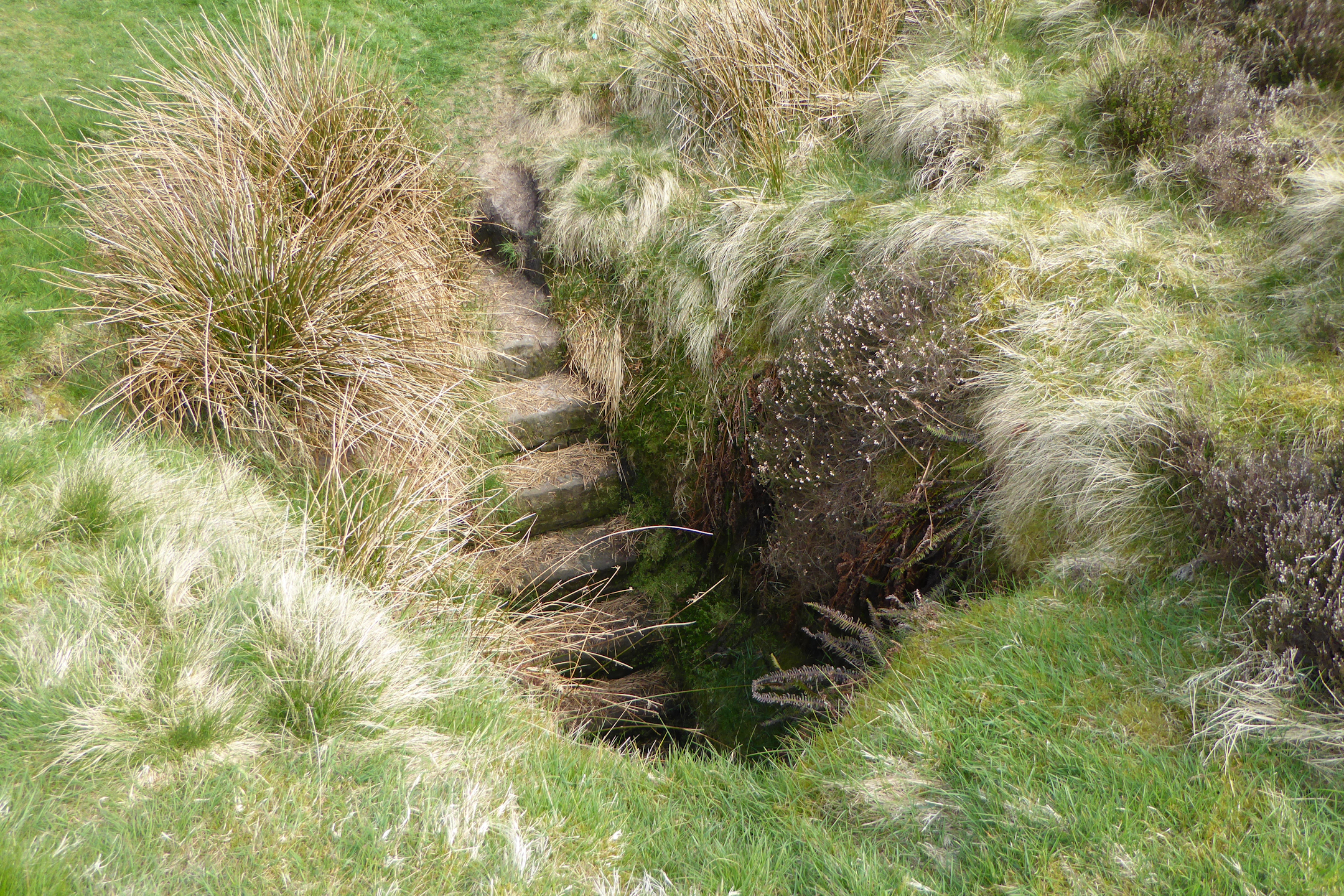
The entrance

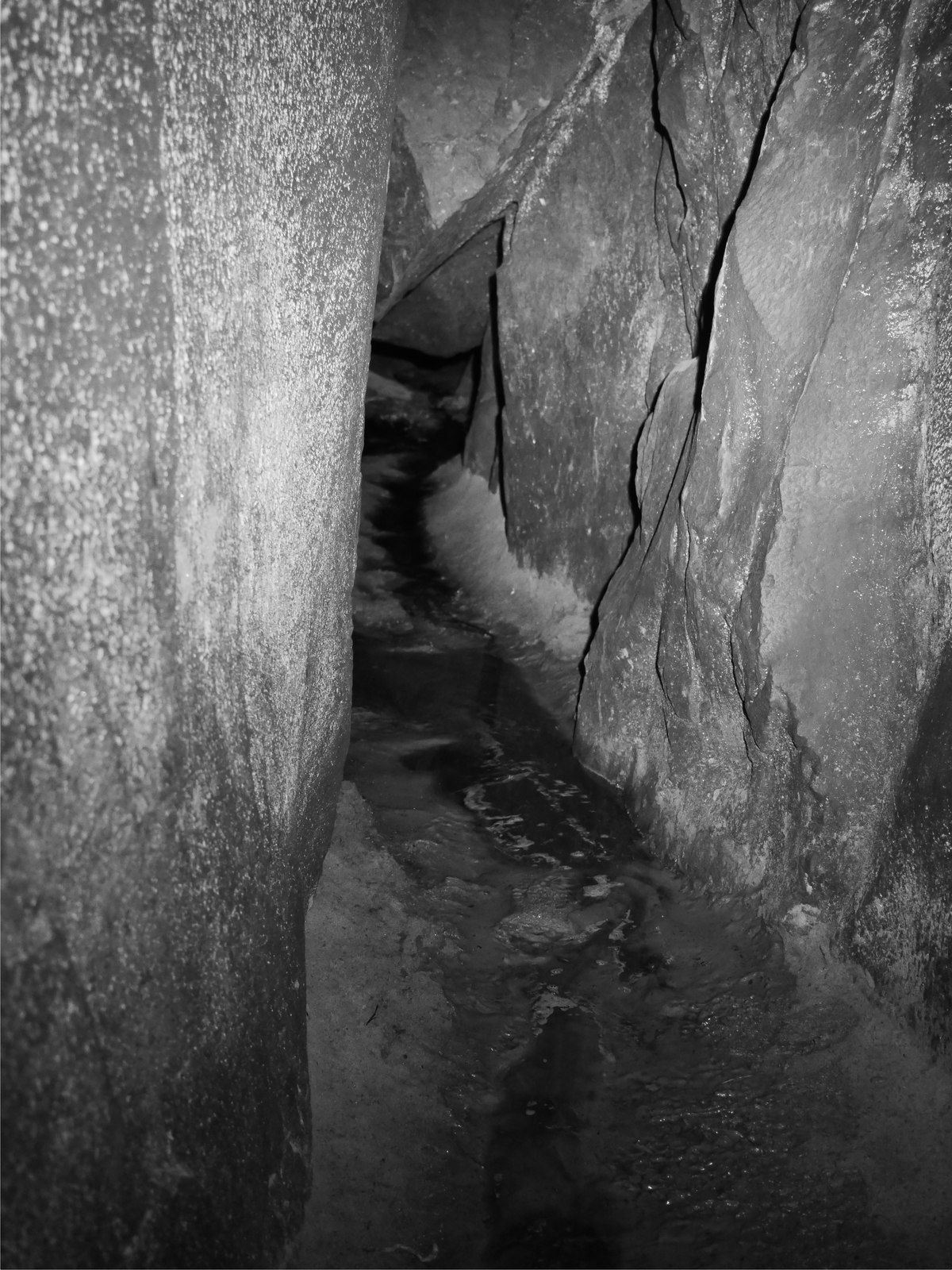
35 metres in

== See also ==
- Bewick and Beanley Moors SSSI
