= Beenleigh (disambiguation) =

Beenleigh, Queensland is a town in Australia. Beenleigh may also refer to:

- Beenleigh Rum, a brand of Australian rum
- Shire of Beenleigh, a former local government area
- Beenleigh State High School, Beenleigh, Queensland

== See also ==
- Beanley, a village in Northumberland, England
