= Duke Boats =

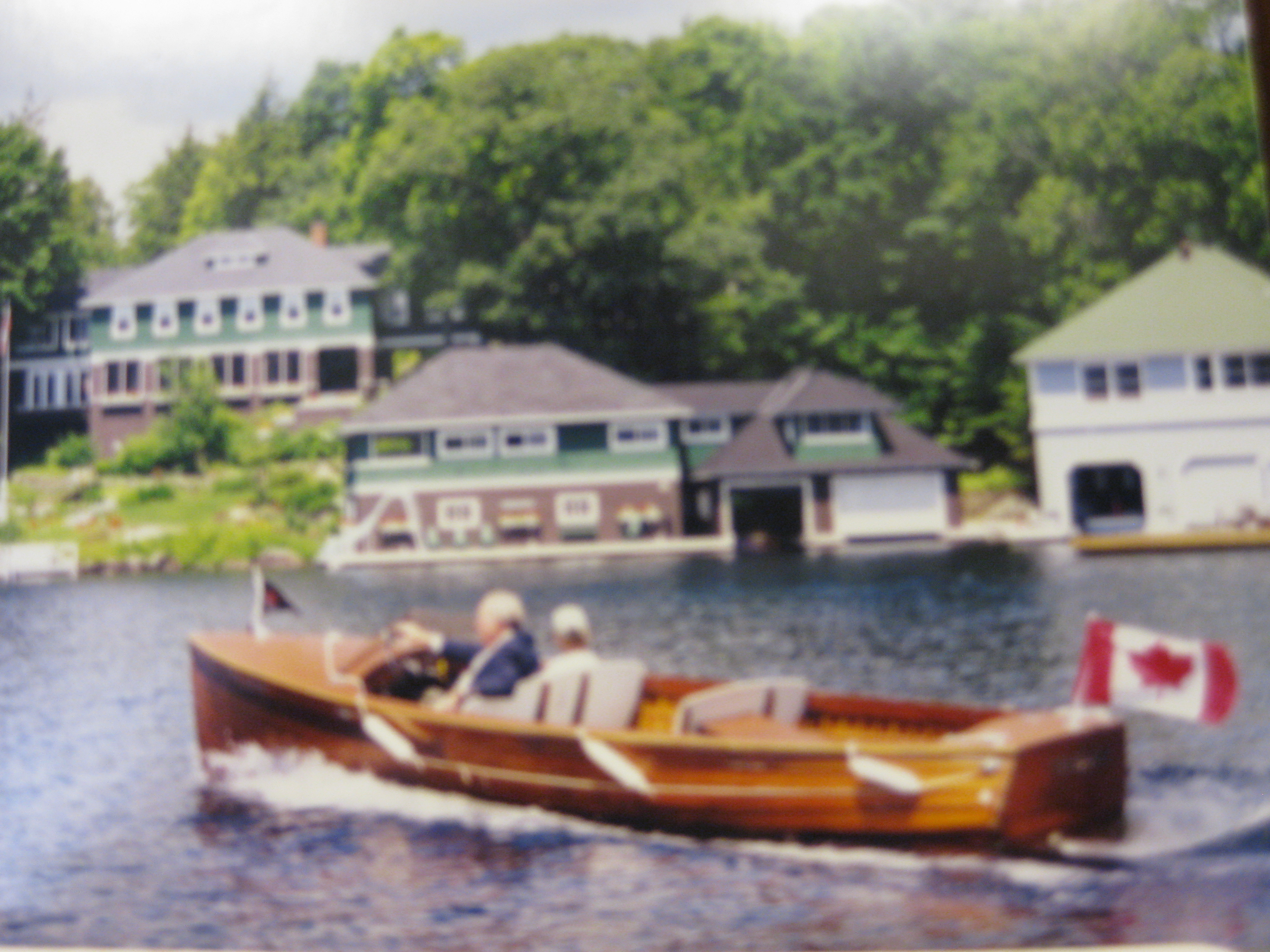
Duke Playmate underway

Duke Boats, Ltd was a manufacturer of wooden inboard runabouts located in Port Carling, Ontario.

Duke Boats was founded by Charlie Duke in 1924 under the name Duke & Greavette, after Duke had worked for the Disappearing Propeller Boat Company, manufacturer of the Dippy and Ditchburn Boats. He began in partnership with Ernie Greavette, who separated in 1926 to begin his own boat company. Duke took over the Port Carling shop and renamed the company Duke Motor Service.

Duke's first boats were 20-foot-long (6.1 m) launches powered by 15- and 45-horsepower engines. Later the company built both 20 and 25 foot mahogany boats powered by 50 h.p. Kermath engines.

In 1930 the company suffered the first of two setbacks when their storage facility was destroyed by an arsonist, along with $100,000 worth of launches. The next year the main shop was lost, also due to fire. A number of boats were rescued by being pushed out of the second floor storage area into the lake.

In 1933 Duke built the first of the popular Playmate model, which remained in production into the 1950s. The first Playmate was powered by a Buchanan Baby Four 15 horsepower motor converted from an Austin car. Four of these models were built in 1934. The Playmate was a 19-foot (5.8 m) wooden lapstrake rounded-bottom hull with all models built in 1935 and later powered by a Buchanan Midget 25-horsepower inboard engine. The boat was redesigned in 1939 with forward seats and a windshield, along with a slightly higher hull, which was the configuration it retained for the rest of the production run.

In 1940 Duke introduced two larger launches; 19 and 21 feet long, with cedar lapstrake bottoms and mahogany topsides and decks. The smaller models were powered by a 4-cylinder Buchanan 57-horsepower or Gray 75-horsepower engine. The larger boat had a Buchanan 6-cylinder Meteor 105 HP engine.

The company halted pleasure boat construction in 1942 to concentrate on producing whalers and cutters for the military, but restarted building the three models after the war. Playmate production ceased in 1953. Charlie Duke died in 1954.

In 1957 the company expanded the 19-foot model to 20 feet and installed a larger, 100-horsepower engine. Customers found, however, that the lapstrake hull did not withstand the higher speeds well, so in 1961 the design was changed to a seam and batten construction with a hard chine. This new style continued in production until 1968.
