= Eglingham =

Village in Northumberland, England

Coordinates: 55.469°N 1.835°W

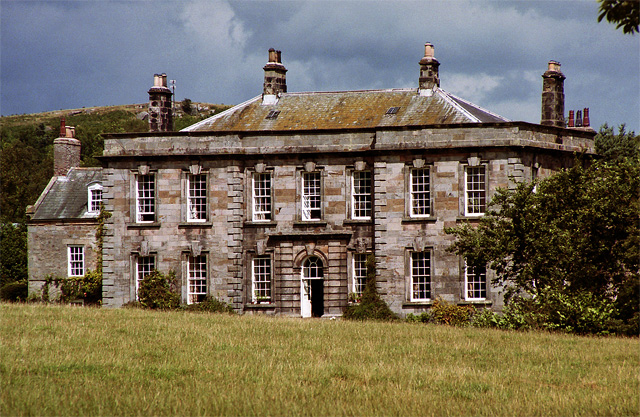
- Eglingham Hall

- Location within Northumberland
- Population: 385 (2011 census for civil parish)
- OS grid reference: NU105195
- District: Northumberland
- Shire county: Northumberland
- Region: North East
- Country: England
- Sovereign state: United Kingdom
- Post town: ALNWICK
- Postcode district: NE66
- Police: Northumbria
- Fire: Northumberland
- Ambulance: North East
- UK Parliament: North Northumberland

Eglingham is a village in Northumberland, England, situated about 7 miles (11 km) north-west of Alnwick and 10 miles (16 km) from Wooler. It lies in the sheltered valley of the Eglingham Burn, a tributary of the River Aln, about 100 metres (330 ft) above sea level, in a rural conservation area set amongst rolling countryside, within 5 miles (8 km) of the Cheviot Hills. The village is surrounded by mainly arable farmland, moorland and woodland, including an arboretum and some commercial forestry.

The village has about 60 dwellings and a population of about 100, most situated either side of the through-road, and including the local manorial property, Eglingham Hall.

Eglingham is also a parish, about nine miles (14 km) in length by four and a half in breadth, with an area of 23,361 acres (94.54 km^{2}). It comprises 2 villages: South Charlton and Eglingham; and 4 settlements – Bassington, Ditchburn, Harehope, Shipley – and several smaller places. The River Breamish, which rises in the Cheviots, runs through the parish. The geological composition of the parish includes rich gravelly loam along the path of the river; clay predominating in the centre of the parish, and unenclosed moorland in the south and east. Within the moor area is Kimmer Loch, covering 10 acres (4.0 ha), and reputed to abound in perch and pike.

The parish is largely agricultural, although gravel extraction continues to the west. Villages in the parish also serve as bases for commuters working in Alnwick and Newcastle upon Tyne.

== History ==
The earliest records of human occupation in the parish are finds of Neolithic or Bronze Age flint tools, a spearhead, and many burial sites, variously cairns, barrows and cists. A number of Iron Age settlements are evident, including a promontory fort east of Shipley moor. Settlements dating to Roman times are found on Beanley moor. It may be surmised that the parish was well populated and involved in extensive farming, from the ability to support multiple communities, a number of which – such as at South Charlton, North Charlton, and possibly in Eglingham village – had early medieval churches. A leper hospital was established at Harehope. Eglingham village was situated on the historic route from Alnwick to Wooler.

In addition to agriculture, the parish's population was also engaged in mining coal and quarrying limestone and freestone, all of which are described as being available in abundance. A nineteenth-century travellers' guide describes a stream of water which "is turned black as common ink by an infusion of galls". Eglingham colliery closed in November 1897, after becoming unprofitable owing to the costs of removing water from the main coal seams at Black Hill.

In more recent times, in 1972, the village and a considerable amount of surrounding land were declared a Conservation Area.

According to the History, Topography, and Directory of Northumberland, its population in 1801, was 1,536; in 1811, 1,538; in 1821, 1,666; in 1831, 1,805; in 1841, 1,832; and in 1851, 2,000.

The parish offered a relatively prosperous living in the form of a vicarage in the diocese of Durham, valued in 1868 at £835. The church of St Maurice is a stone structure, rebuilt after the English Restoration, having been destroyed, together with neighbouring chapels, by the Scots during the Rebellion, and was enlarged by the addition of a transept in 1836.

Some time between 1217 and 1226, Richard Marsh, the Bishop of Durham, gave the tithes of Eglingham to the Abbey of St Albans to help the monks make a better ale, "taking compassion on the weakness of the convent's drink", according to an eighteenth-century historian.

== Landmarks ==
Eglingham Hall, dating to the 16th or 17th century, built originally as the home of the Ogle family. Harehope Hall was built in 1848 as a sporting lodge for the Baker-Cresswell family.

Village facilities include a village hall, and a pub-restaurant, the highly regarded Tankerville Arms.

== Religious sites ==
The 13th-century parish church is dedicated to St Maurice and may originally have served as a fortified pele tower where the villagers could take refuge from marauding bands of cattle thieves, or Border Reivers. The church bell, cast in the Low Countries, is one of the only two foreign bells in the Diocese of Newcastle; the other is at Lambley.

== Notable people ==
- Henry Baker Tristram (1822–1906), English clergyman, Biblical scholar, traveller and ornithologist born at Eglingham vicarage
- Vera Stanley Alder (1898–1984), portrait painter, born at Eglingham

== See also ==
- Bewick and Beanley Moors SSSI
- Cateran Hole
- Hunterheugh Crags
- Jenny's Lantern
