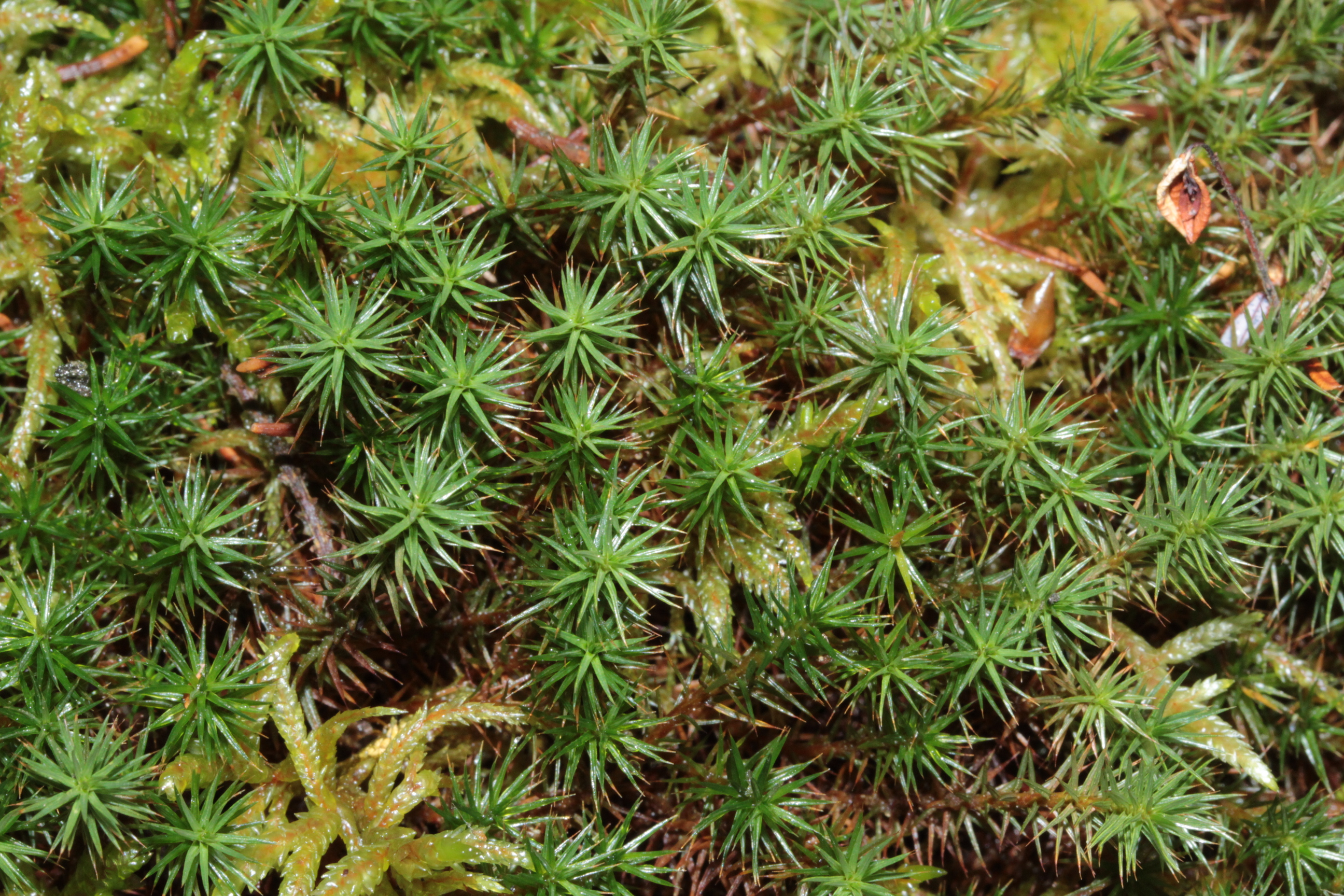

Scientific classification
- Kingdom: Plantae
- Division: Bryophyta
- Class: Polytrichopsida
- Order: Polytrichales
- Family: Polytrichaceae
- Genus: Polytrichum
- Species: P. strictum

Binomial name
- Polytrichum strictum Bridel, J. Bot. (Schrader)

= Polytrichum strictum =

Species of moss

Polytrichum strictum, commonly known as bog haircap moss or strict haircap, is an evergreen and perennial species of moss native to Sphagnum bogs and other moist habitats in temperate climates. It has a circumboreal distribution, and is also found in South America and Antarctica.

== Description ==
Like other species in the Polytrichaceae, Polytrichum strictum has leaves with a single costa, vertical lamellae, a water-repelling cuticle, and rhizoids that appear to facilitate external water movement in addition to anchoring the plant. Dense tufts of slender stems from 6–12 cm form 20–40 cm hummocks in bogs and similar substrates. Leaves are narrowly lanceolate, appressed to the stem when dry and spreading to erect when moist. The reddish awn (formed by the slightly excurrent costa) and smooth, inrolled leaf margins separate P. strictum from other Polytrichum species; only juniper haircap moss (P. juniperinum) shares these attributes. P. strictum, however, can be easily distinguished by the wooly-tomentose white rhizoids that extend up its stems (absent in P. juniperinum), as well as its boggy habitat and predilection for organic soils (in contrast to the weedy nature and preference for mineral soils that characterize P. juniperinum).

== Distribution ==
Polytrichum strictum is found throughout Canada, the northern half of the United States, Greenland, Iceland, the Faroe Islands, northern Europe and Asia, as well as Antarctica and the southern half of South America. It is characteristic of boggy peatland habitats dominated by Sphagnum mosses, but can also be found in wet heaths, tundra, sedge meadows, and peaty forests from low to high elevations; in warmer climates, it is largely confined to relict bogs. Its microhabitat is at the top of peat hummocks, which it often helps to form.

== Reproduction ==
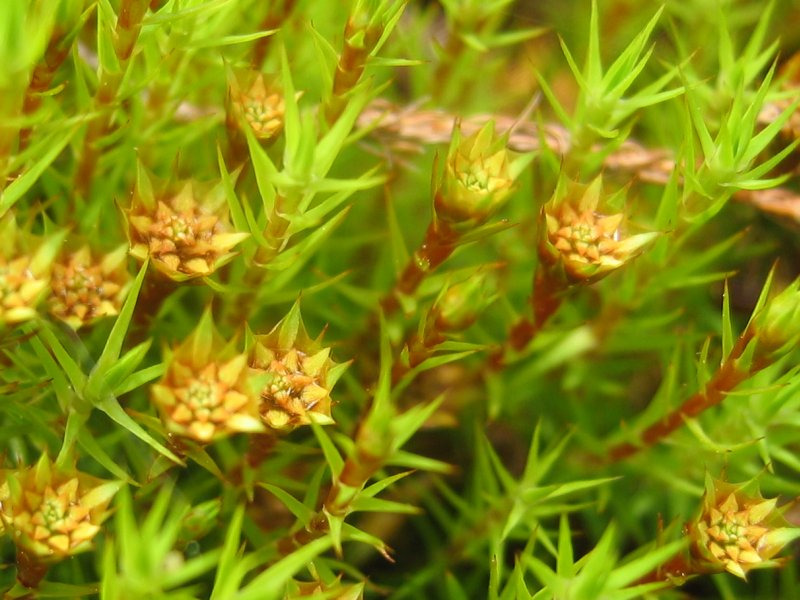
The male reproductive structures of P. strictum, featuring splash cups.

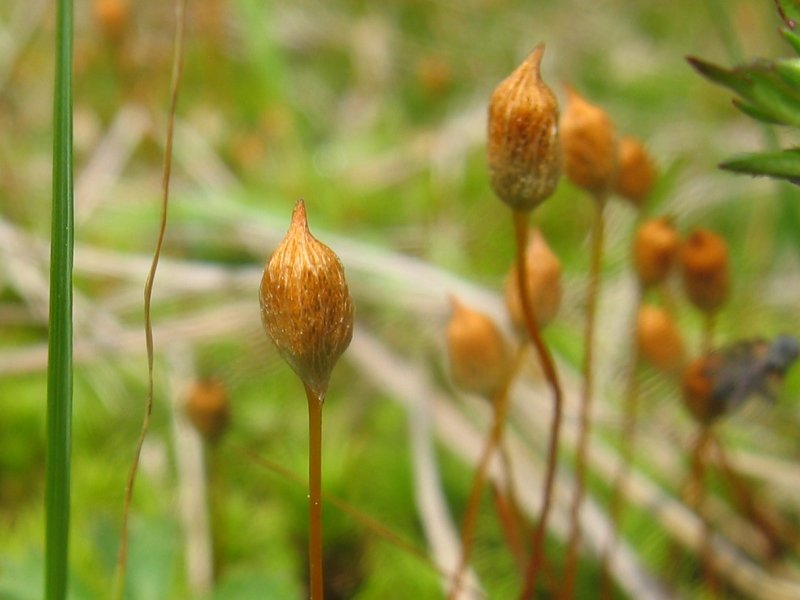
Immature sporophytes of P. strictum, with calyptra clearly visible.

Polytrichum strictum is dioicous, with male and female reproductive structures produced separately by male and female gametophytes, which are haploid (1n). As in other Polytrichum species, the antheridia are borne terminally on male plants and swell and burst when mature, launching sperm into the air; in addition, they develop in splash cups, which further facilitate sperm dispersal by catching and harnessing the energy of rain drops. The lucky few sperm to land near the archegonia of a female plant (also borne terminally) use their two whiplash flagella to swim down the neck and into the venter, where one will fertilize the ovum. Once fertilisation takes place, the zygote develops into the diploid (2n) sporophyte, which consists of a foot (embedded in the tissue of the gametophyte), a seta (or stalk), and a capsule. The capsule, which is covered by a dirty-white calyptra, matures after the seta elongates, at which point the calyptra is shed. Within the capsule, each sporoctye undergoes meiosis to produce four haploid (1n) spores; when these are mature, the operculum is projected and the spores are released through the peristome, which is joined by the epiphragm and ringed by 64 nematodontous teeth. When the proper conditions and substrate are available, the spores germinate into a filamentous protonema, from which the gametophytes emerge, completing the cycle.

== Use in restoration ==
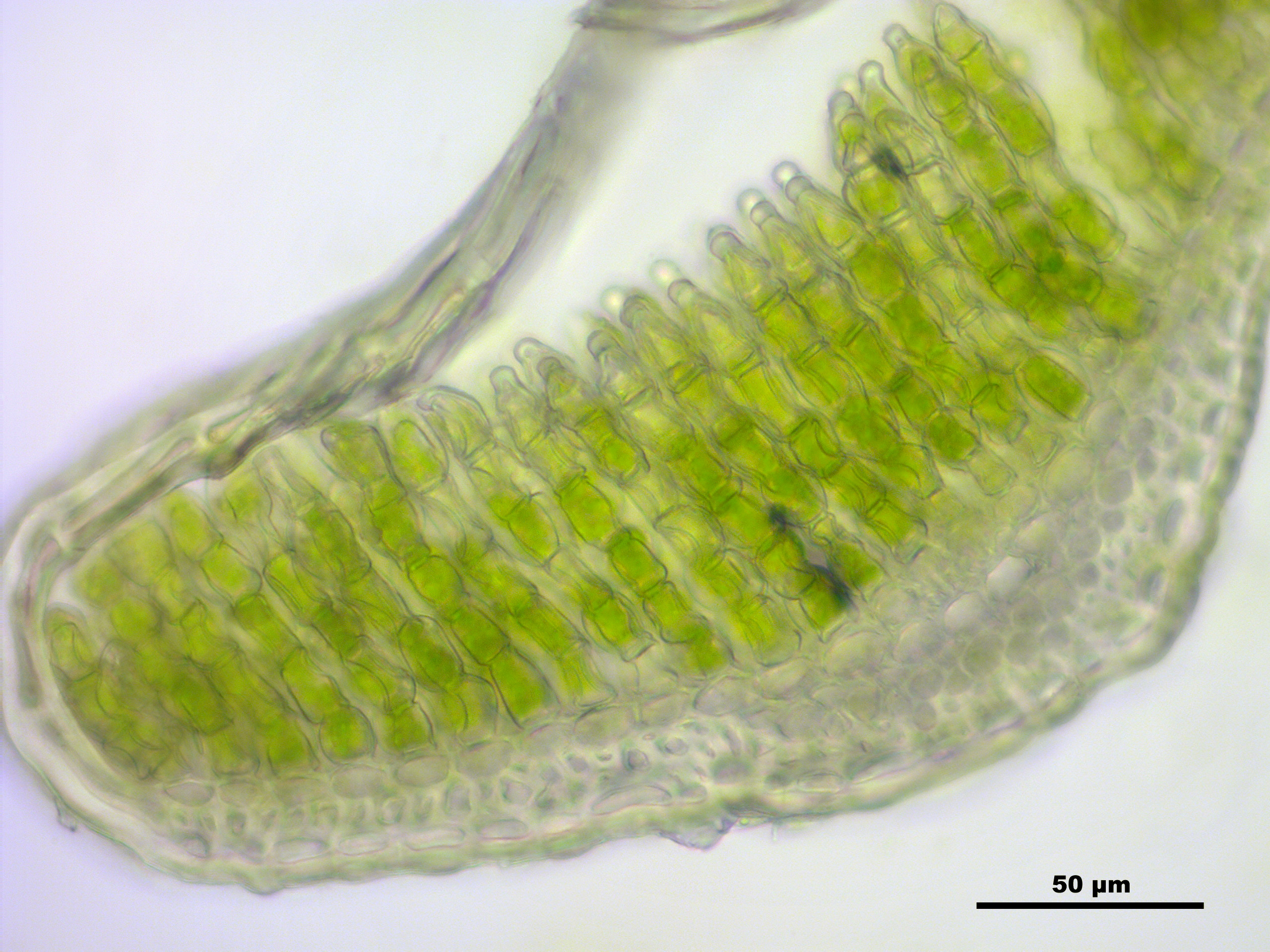
P. strictum leaf cross section, showing lamellae, costa, and inrolled leaf margin

Polytrichum strictum is considered an important pioneer species in peatlands, able to tolerate a wide range of environmental conditions and disturbance regimes. It is instrumental in preventing frost heaving in harvested peatlands, and research suggests it can be used in the restoration of unstable peat areas, although little is known about whether it aids or hinders Sphagnum growth.
