= Bewick and Beanley Moors =

Protected area in Northumberland, England

- Site of Special Scientific Interest
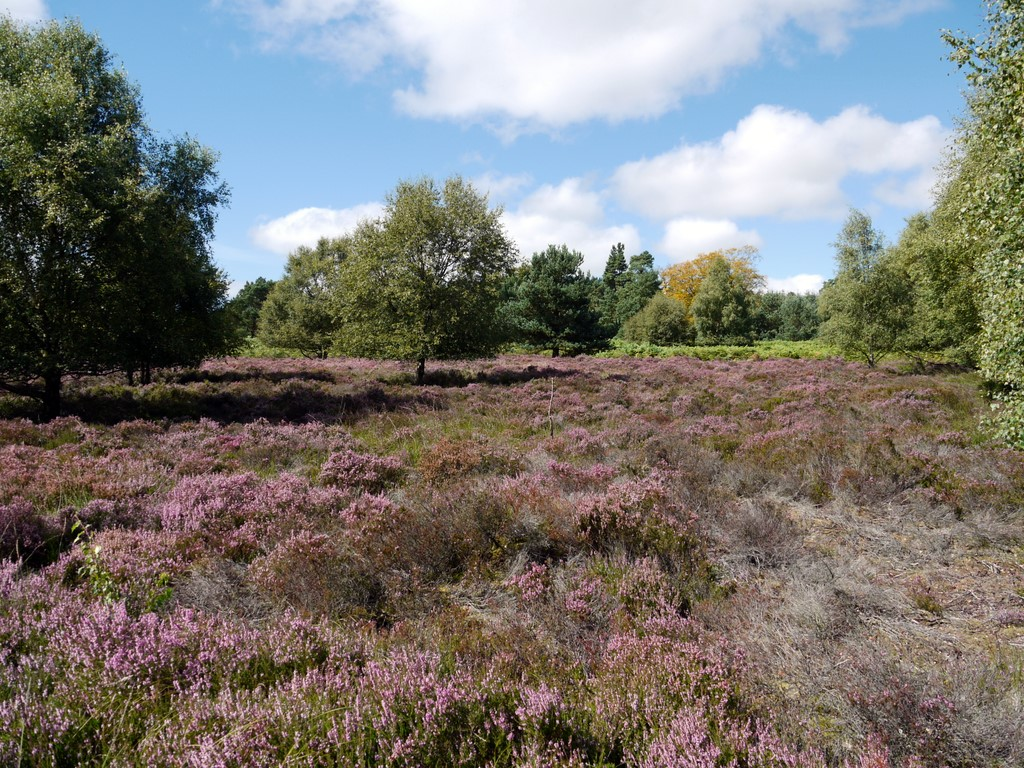
- Forestry enclosure on Beanley Moor

- Location within Northumberland
- Location of Bewick and Beanley Moors.
- Area of search: Northumberland
- Grid reference: NU102225
- Coordinates: 55.498205°N 1.853601°W
- Interest: Biological
- Area: 3,434.95 hectares (8,500 acres)
- Notification date: 2010
- Location map: DEFRA MAGIC map

Bewick and Beanley Moors is the name given to a Site of Special Scientific Interest (SSSI) in north Northumberland, in the north-east of England. The moors are asserted to be of national importance by Natural England for the extent, quality and diversity of upland types including heaths, fens, wet grassland, flushes, mires and blanket bogs, together creating an extensive mosaic habitat supporting an exceptional community of amphibians. The moors are important, too, for their relict juniper woodland and scrub.

Designated in 2010, Bewick and Beanley Moors incorporates within its boundaries two now denotified SSSIs, Hannah's Hill, Harehope (first notified in 1968) and Quarryhouse Moor Ponds (first notified in 1986).

== Location and natural features ==
Bewick and Beanley Moors, as defined for the purposes of the SSSI, are three distinct and non-contiguous moorland areas in north Northumberland, located to the north and north-west of Alnwick, and to the south-east of Wooler, extending to about 8.6 miles (13.8 km) north to south, and up to 3.8 miles (6.1 km) east to west. The moors are to the west of the A1, east of the A697 and south of the B6348 roads.

- The southernmost section, south-east of Beanley, south of Eglingham and the B6346 road, and north of Bolton and Titlington, is an irregularly shaped area of moorland, some 2.3 miles (3.7 km) north to south, and 3.0 miles (4.8 km) east to west. It is composed of, from the west,
  - Titlington Pike, a round hill rising from circa 170 metres (560 ft) to 288 metres (945 ft) above sea level;
  - Titlington and Beanley Plantations and Beanley Moss, wetlands falling gently to the east from about 200 metres (660 ft) to 175 metres (574 ft);
  - Beanley Moor, making up the majority of the area, wetlands falling very slowly from 175 metres (574 ft) to 125 metres (410 ft) before descending to about 90 metres (300 ft) at Kimmer and Hunterheugh Crags, a semicircle escarpment of steeply descending land with rock outcrops; and
  - Kimmer Lough, a 3.2 hectares (7.9 acres) ovaloid kettle hole (a deep pond formed in the void remaining after a submerged glacial calf block melted) at circa 75 metres (246 ft) above sea level. Kimmer Crags, at the centre of the area, is 5.2 miles (8.4 km) north-east of Alnwick and 1.25 miles (2.01 km) south of Eglingham.
- The middle and largest section, north of Eglingham and south-east of Chillingham and Hepburn, extends to some 3.5 miles (5.6 km) north to south, and 3.8 miles (6.1 km) east to west, and is composed of
  - in the south, Bewick Moor;
  - in the north west, Hepburn Moor; and
  - in the north east, Quarryhouse Moor,

which rise from about 100 metres (330 ft) in the south-east at Harehope in a series of escarpments to a wetland plateau area starting at about 210 metres (690 ft) with Cateran Hill, a 267 metres (876 ft) local peak, at the centre. At the far north west, the site includes Ross Castle, a 315 metres (1,033 ft) hill just east of Chillingham Castle. Cateran Hill (notable locally for the Cateran Hole) is about 2.3 miles (3.7 km) north of Eglingham.

- The northernmost section, situated on the east-falling slopes of moors from 2 miles (3.2 km) east of Chillingham and south of the B6348 road, is again irregularly shaped, extending some 3.2 miles (5.1 km) north to south, and 2.8 miles (4.5 km) east to west. It is composed of parts of Chatton Moor in the north, Sandyford Moor in the centre and to the south-east, Rossbrough Moor and Wandylaw Bog; the site incorporates part of Wandylaw Wind Farm, and the Chatton transmitting station.

The moors rise very slowly from about 150 metres (490 ft) and 180 metres (590 ft) at the eastern boundary, to a number of local maxima ranging from 189 metres (620 ft) to 215 metres (705 ft).

Bewick Moor is drained by Harehope Burn. The river at Bewick Moor is marked by a sandstone river ghyll or gorge known as Harehope Canyon. The canyon is marked at its northernmost end by Dove Crags. The river drains, via the Eglingham Burn, into the River Aln.

== Vegetation ==
Bewick and Beanley Moors sit on Fell Sandstone of the Border Group, falling from 315 metres (1,033 ft) in the west to 70 metres (230 ft) in the east, and are a nationally important example of a mosaic of habitats supporting a wide range of vegetation types associated with the transition from lowland to upland moors. The SSSI citation for the moors defines the principal vegetation and describes a number of specific landforms and transitional areas occurring throughout the site which give rise to specific local flora communities.

The dominant flora of the site is characterised as a wet heath composed of heather (Calluna vulgaris), purple moor-grass (Molinia caerulea), cross-leaved heath (Erica tetralix), deergrass (Trichophorum cespitosum), bilberry (Vaccinium myrtillus) and tormentil (Potentilla erecta), and occasional bog-moss (Sphagnum capillifolium).

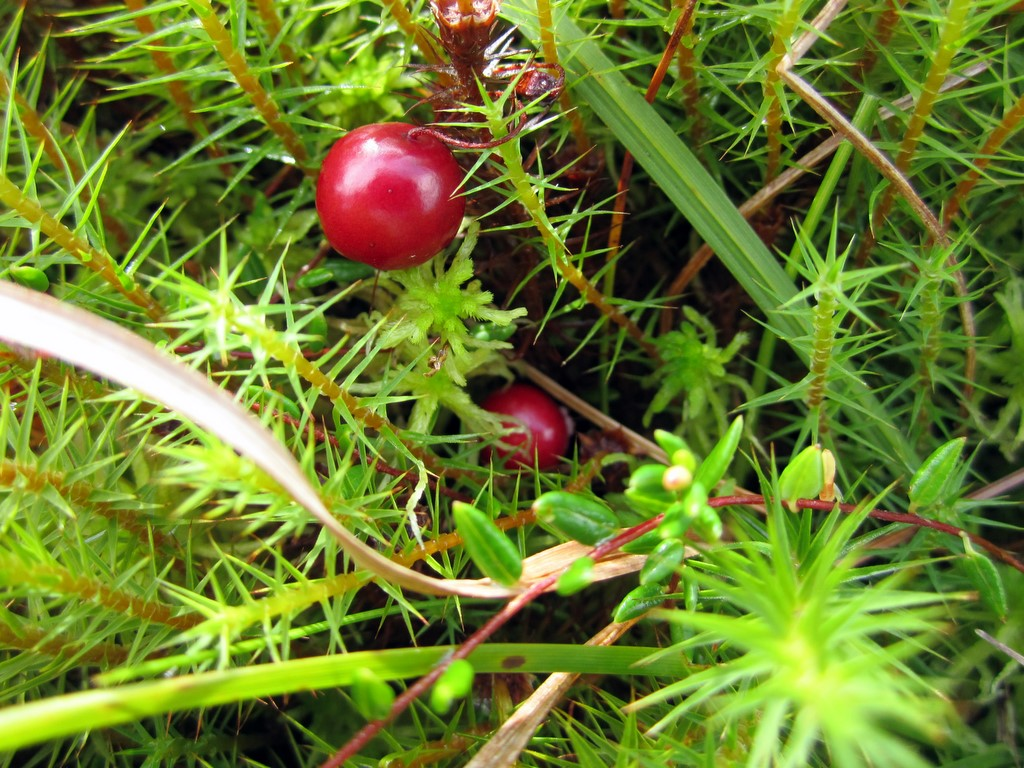
Cranberry (Vaccinium oxycoccos) on Beanley Moor

A repeated feature of the moors, notably found in the central parts of Bewick Moor and at Beanley Moss, are bogs formed in the depressions and basins abounding throughout the site, and on flat land found on higher ground above valleys. The bogs - waterlogged peat accumulations - fall in type between basin mires and blanket bogs, and are an important factor in the significance of the site on their own account, as they transition to other landforms, and because they are the easternmost examples in Britain of such habitats. Bog sites on the moors give rise to heather, cross-leaved heath, common and hare’s-tail cotton-grasses (Eriophorum angustifolium and E. vaginatum) amongst a variety of bog-mosses including (Sphagnum papillosum), (S. capillifolium) and (S. magellanicum). Less common are crowberry (Empetrum nigrum ssp. nigrum), cranberry (Vaccinium oxycoccos), bog asphodel (Narthecium ossifragum) and round-leaved sundew (Drosera rotundifolia).

Transitional bog sites of the sort found on the moors, within heathland, are uncommon and give rise to noteworthy flora. At a bog site west of Cateran Hill there is a transition into a fen supporting bottle-sedge (Carex rostrata), marsh cinquefoil (Potentilla palustris), and the bog-moss (Sphagnum fallax). A Quarryhouse Moor example shows a transition from bog to an area of purple moor-grass, bottle sedge, star and carnation sedges (Carex echinata and C. panicea), bog-moss (Sphagnum palustre), and related species.

Watercourses across the site support soft or sharp-flowered rush (Juncus effusus and J. acutiflorus), haircap moss (Polytrichum commune), and occasional associated flora such as star-sedge, marsh pennywort (Hydrocotyle vulgaris) and bogbean (Menyanthes trifoliata).

Rich wetlands occur especially at the east of the moors, and have species mixes arising in part out of the effects of a limestone understratum dominated by purple moor-grass with, in less-grazed areas, bog-myrtle (Myrica gale), and in more-grazed areas, cross-leaved heath and tormentil, with sweet vernal-grass (Anthoxanthum odoratum), Yorkshire fog (Holcus lanatus), compact rush (Juncus conglomeratus), sneezewort (Achillea ptramica), marsh thistle (Cirsium palustre) and wild angelica (Angelica sylvestris), and limestone indicators including carnation, glaucous and flea sedges (Carex panicea, C. flacca and C. pulicaris), fen bedstraw (Galium uliginosum), tufted vetch (Vicia cracca) and moss (Hylocomium splendens).

The site has local wetland areas strongly influenced by limestone, with marsh valerian (Valeriana dioica), butterwort (Pinguicula vulgaris), lesser club-moss (Selaginella selaginoides), grass-of-Parnassus (Parnassia palustris), dioecious sedge (Carex dioica), few-flowered spike-rush (Eleocharis quinqueflora) and black bog-rush (Schoenus nigricans). Dry limestone flora are for the most part not found on the moors, with the exception of areas of mat-grass (Nardus stricta).

Rocky outcrops on the site, when accompanied by free draining soil, provide habitat for heather, bilberry and bell-heather (Erica cinerea), with local dry-heath cowberry (Vaccinium vitis-idaea) and petty-whin (Genista anglica). Lesser twayblade (Listera cordata) is found in association with old collapsing heather bushes.

Conifer plantations aside, the moors have little woodland cover; what exists is found on the boundaries and following the paths of streams at lower elevations. Species include alder (Alnus glutinosa), hawthorn (Crataegus monogyna), brown birch (Betula pubescens), rowan (Sorbus aucuparia) and occasional ash (Fraxinus excelsior), and ground-cover of yellow pimpernel (Lysimachia nemorum), wood sorrel (Oxalis acetosella) and smooth-stalked sedge (Carex laevigata). As with the bogs, so the woodland also provide transition locations, such as from wet birch-wood to purple moor-grass or to bogs of lesser pond-sedge (Carex acutiformis). Other wood species found include scrubs of eared sallow (Salix aurita), acid oakwood (Quercus petraea), and, notably one of the largest stands of juniper (Juniperus communis ssp. communis) in the county at Hannah's Wood, 1.1 miles (1.8 km) west of Eglingham.

Kimmer Lough, the largest of the many waterbodies across the moors, supports yellow water-lily (Nuphar lutea) and reed (Phragmites communis), surrounded by a willow woodland with bog-myrtle. Quarryhouse Moor Ponds, to the north-east of the middle section of the site, is notable as habitat for amphibians including great crested, palmate and smooth newts (Triturus cristatus, T. helveticus and T. vulgaris), the common frog (Rana temporaria) and the common toad (Bufo bufo).

Additional notable features of the site are the presence of the large heath butterfly (Coenonympha tullia), the upland bird population, and stands of bracken (Pteridium aquilinum) with chickweed wintergreen (Trientalis europaea).

Condition

Bewick and Beanley Moors SSSI is divided into 25 units for monitoring purposes. Inspections in 2009 and 2014 found the condition of the majority of units to be 'unfavourable-recovering', with over-grazing and unfavourable heather-burning regimes being the main causal issues.

== See also ==
- List of Sites of Special Scientific Interest in Northumberland
