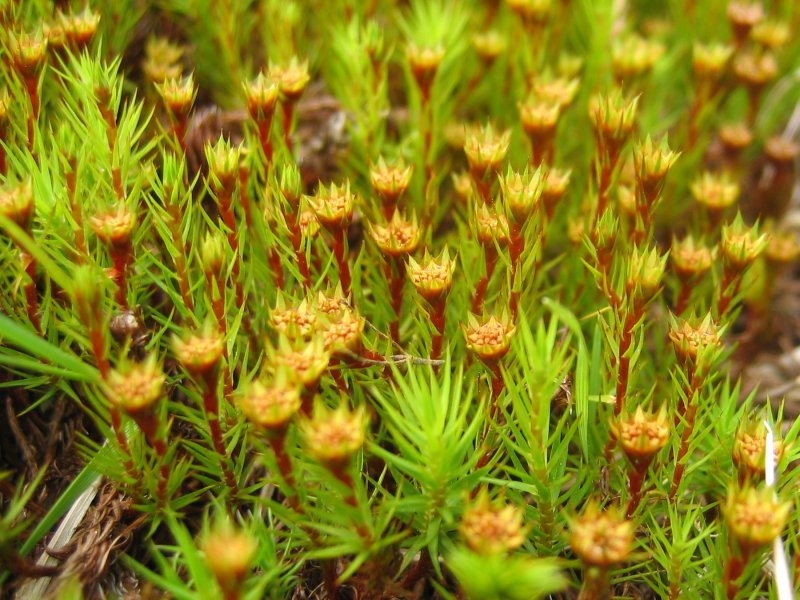
- Male gametophytes bearing antheridia

Scientific classification
- Kingdom: Plantae
- Clade: Embryophytes
- Division: Bryophyta
- Class: Polytrichopsida
- Order: Polytrichales
- Family: Polytrichaceae
- Genus: Polytrichum; Hedw.

= Polytrichum =

Genus of mosses in the family Polytrichaceae

Polytrichum is a genus of mosses — commonly called haircap moss or hair moss — which contains approximately 70 species that have a cosmopolitan distribution. The genus Polytrichum has a number of closely related sporophytic characters. The scientific name is derived from the Ancient Greek words polys, meaning "many", and thrix, meaning "hair". This name was used in ancient times to refer to plants with fine, hairlike parts, including mosses, but this application specifically refers to the hairy calyptras found on young sporophytes. A similar naming related to hair appears in Old Norse, haddr silfjar, "hair of Sif", goddess from Norse Mythology, wife of the god Thor. There are two major sections of Polytrichum species. The first — section Polytrichum — has narrow, toothed, and relatively erect leaf margins. The other — section Juniperifolia — has broad, entire, and sharply inflexed leaf margins that enclose the lamellae on the upper leaf surface.

Anatomy of Polytrichum formosum.

== Appearance ==
Haircap moss gets its name from the hairs that cover, or cap, the calyptra where each spore case is held. Looking down, haircap moss has a star-shaped appearance due to its pointed leaves arranged spirally at right angles around a stiff stem. It is generally dark green in color and grows 4 – 20 cm tall, with only a couple species growing past that, such as P. commune.The average life span of this moss is three to five years, though the longest have lived up to ten, and the moss can remain intact for long periods after death.

== Physiology ==
Mosses in the genus Polytrichum are endohydric, meaning water is conducted from the base of the plant. While mosses are considered non-vascular plants, those of Polytrichum show clear differentiation of water conducting tissue. One of these water conducting tissues is termed the hydrome, which makes up the central cylinder of stem tissue. It consists of cells with a relatively wide diameter called hydroids, which conduct water. This tissue is analogous to xylem in higher plants. The other tissue is called leptome, which surrounds the hydrome, contains smaller cells and is analogous to phloem.

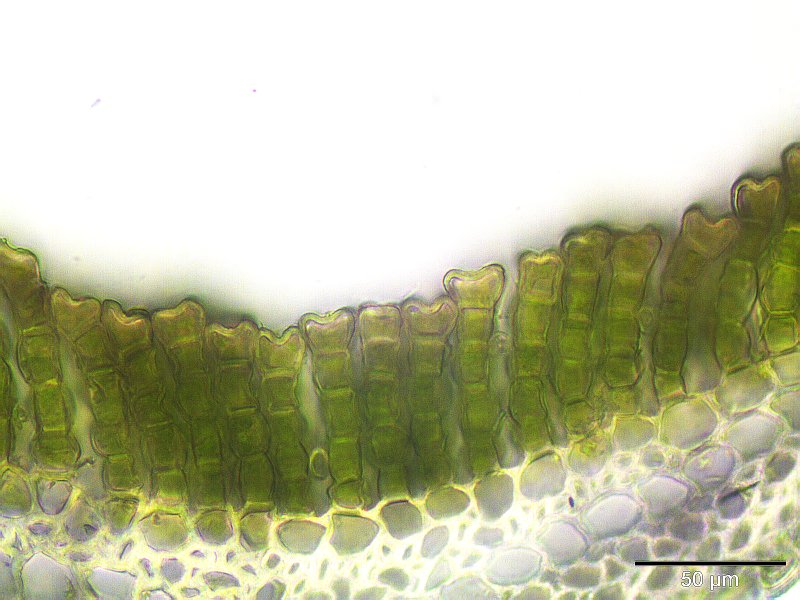
Cross section of a leaf of Polytrichum commune showing parallel photosynthetic lamellae at 400x magnification. The green cells contain chloroplasts.

Another characteristic feature of the genus is its parallel photosynthetic lamellae on the upper surfaces of the leaves. The leaves of most mosses are simply a single plate of cells, but those of Polytrichum have more highly differentiated photosynthetic tissue. This is an example of a xeromorphic adaption, an adaptation for dry conditions. Moist air is trapped in between the rows of lamellae, while the larger terminal cells act to contain moisture and protect the photosynthetic cells. This minimises water loss as relatively little tissue is directly exposed to the environment, but allows for enough gas exchange for photosynthesis to take place. The microenvironment between the lamellae can host a number of microscopic organisms such as parasitic fungi and rotifers. Additionally, the leaves will curve and then twist around the stem when conditions become too dry, this being another xeromorphic adaptation. It is speculated that the teeth along the leaf's edge may aid in this process, or perhaps also that they help discourage small invertebrates from attacking the leaves.

Polytrichum species are dioicous, having separate male and female plants. The reproductive branches arise from the apex of the main gametophyte axis.

== Classification ==
The genus Polytrichastrum was separated from Polytrichum in 1971 based on the structure of the peristome (which controls spore release). However, molecular and morphological data from 2010 support moving some species back into Polytrichum.

== Species ==
- Polytrichum appalachianum
- Polytrichum alpinum
- Polytrichum commune
- Polytrichum formosum
- Polytrichum hyperboreum
- Polytrichum juniperinum
- Polytrichum longisetum
- Polytrichum lyallii
- Polytrichum ohioense
- Polytrichum pallidisetum
- Polytrichum papillatum
- Polytrichum piliferum
- Polytrichum sexangulare
- Polytrichum sphaerothecium
- Polytrichum strictum
- Polytrichum swartzii
