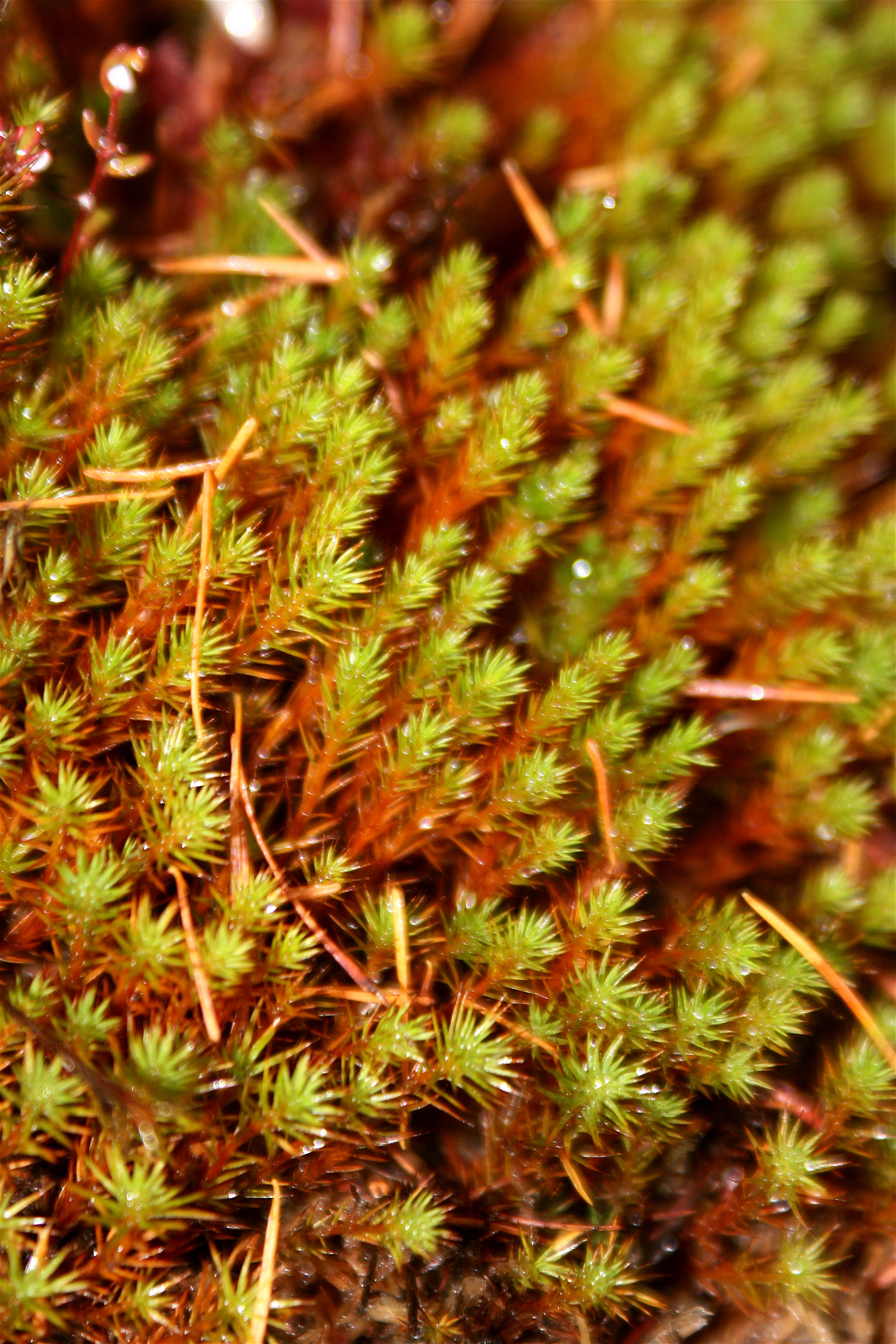

Scientific classification
- Kingdom: Plantae
- Division: Bryophyta
- Class: Polytrichopsida
- Order: Polytrichales
- Family: Polytrichaceae
- Genus: Polytrichum
- Species: P. longisetum

Binomial name
- Polytrichum longisetum Brid.

= Polytrichum longisetum =

Species of moss

Polytrichum longisetum is a species of Polytrichaceae. It is found in cooler areas of both the Southern and Northern hemispheres.
