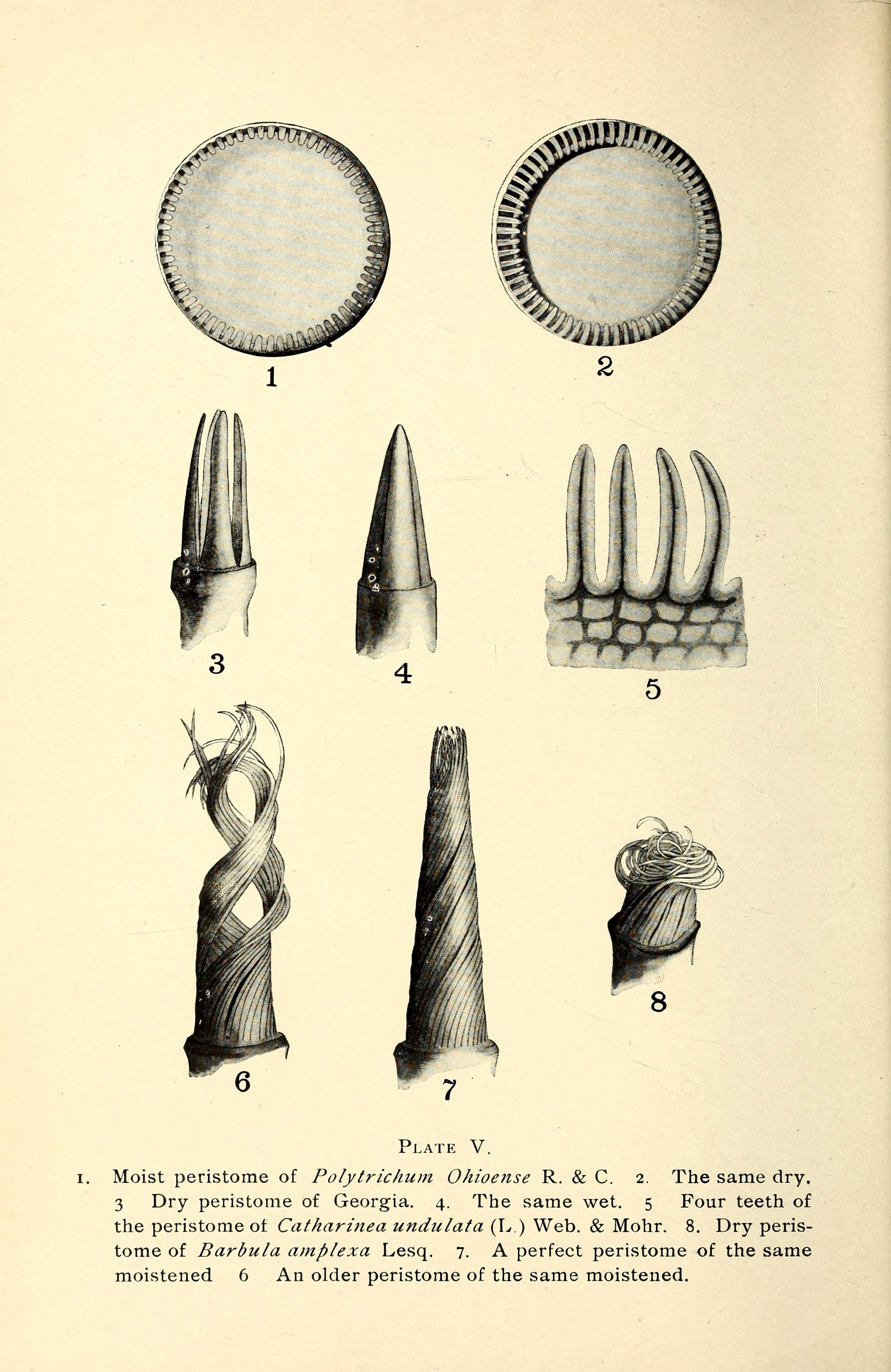

Scientific classification
- Kingdom: Plantae
- Division: Bryophyta
- Class: Polytrichopsida
- Order: Polytrichales
- Family: Polytrichaceae
- Genus: Polytrichum
- Species: P. ohioense

Binomial name
- Polytrichum ohioense Ren. & Card.

= Polytrichum ohioense =

Species of moss

Polytrichum ohioense is a species of Polytrichaceae, commonly referred to as Ohio polytrichum moss or Ohio hair-cap moss. It is found on soil and rocks of dry to moist hardwood forests of Eastern North America, New Mexico and Europe.
