= Harold Fawcus =

English cricketer and British Army officer (1876–1947)

Lieutenant-General Sir Harold Fawcus KCB CMG DSO
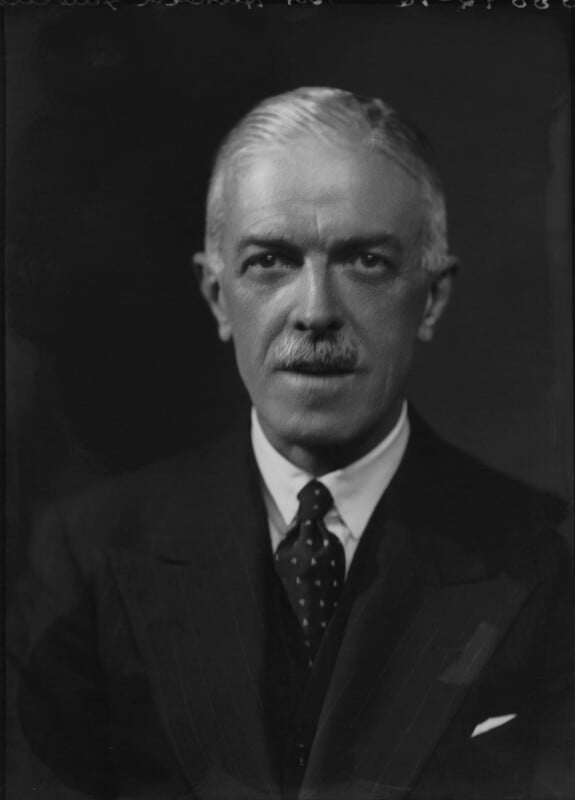
- Fawcus in 1937
- Born: Harold Ben Fawcus; 20 May 1876; South Charlton, Northumberland, England
- Died: 24 October 1947 (aged 71); Hillingdon, Middlesex, England
- Cricket career

Cricket information
- Batting: Right-handed
- Bowling: Right-arm medium

Domestic team information
- Years: Team
- 1898–1906: Northumberland
- 1910/11: Orange Free State

Career statistics
Competition	First-class
Matches	9
Runs scored	276
Batting average	18.40
100s/50s	0/1
Top score	56
Balls bowled	1,579
Wickets	45
Bowling average	13.75
5 wickets in innings	3
10 wickets in match	2
Best bowling	7/19
Catches/stumpings	6/–
- Source: Cricinfo, 26 May 2019

Lieutenant-General Sir Harold Ben Fawcus KCB CMG DSO (20 May 1876 – 24 October 1947) was a British Army officer and an English first-class cricketer. After studying medicine at Durham University, Fawcus was commissioned into the Royal Army Medical Corps. He would serve with the corps from 1900 to 1934, serving in the Second Boer War, the First World War and the Third Anglo-Afghan War, for which he was highly decorated. He eventually rose to the rank of lieutenant-general. During his time in the military, he played first-class cricket in South Africa for Orange Free State and in England for the British Army cricket team. In retirement he served as the director-general of the British Red Cross.

== Early life and military career ==
The son of John Fawcus, he was born at South Charlton in Northumberland. He was educated at Durham College, before studying medicine at the Durham University College of Medicine. During this time he played rugby union for Durham and Northumberland, as well as debuting in minor counties cricket for Northumberland in the 1898 Minor Counties Championship. After completing his studies at Durham, Fawcus was commissioned into the British Army as a lieutenant with the Royal Army Medical Corps in May 1900. He served in the Second Boer War, taking part in operations in Natal, Cape Colony, Orange Free State and Transvaal Colony. He was awarded both the Queen's South Africa Medal and the King's South Africa Medal. He was promoted to the rank of captain in May 1903, and obtained a diploma in public health in 1905. At his examination for promotion to major in 1907 he obtained a first-class certificate enabling him to year's acceleration of promotion, something only two other officers in the British Army had achieved to that point.

He had played his final minor counties matches for Northumberland in 1906. He served in South Africa around 1910, during which he made his debut in first-class cricket for Orange Free State against Transvaal in the 1910/11 Currie Cup. Fawcus appeared for Orange Free State on five more occasions during the competition, scoring 184 runs with a high score of 48, while taking 33 wickets with his right-arm medium pace, with his 33 wickets costing 12.72 apiece. His best figures were 7 for 19 and he twice took a five wicket haul and ten wickets in a match. He was promoted to the rank of major in May 1911, He was appointed to the position of deputy assistant professor of hygiene at the Royal Army Medical College, a role he undertook from 1912 to 1914. Fawcus played first-class cricket for the British Army cricket team in 1913–14, making three appearances. In these he scored 92 runs with a high score of 56, while with the ball he took 12 wickets with best figures of 5 for 11, which came against the Royal Navy in 1913. He was appointed to the Army School of Sanitation at Aldershot Garrison prior to the First World War.

== Later military career and life ==
Fawcus served during the war and was promoted to the rank of lieutenant colonel in March 1915. He was made a Companion of the Order of St Michael and St George (CMG) in the 1915 Birthday Honours. He was made a temporary colonel in April 1917. He awarded the Croix de guerre by France in June 1917. Throughout the course of the war, Fawcus was mentioned in dispatches six times.

Following the war, he was promoted to the rank of brevet colonel in June 1919, and in the same year he served in the Third Anglo-Afghan War. He served as an assistant director-general at the War Office from June 1922 – July 1926. He was appointed as the honorary physician to George V in January 1923, following the retirement of Sir Alfred Blenkinsop. He was promoted to the full rank of colonel in June 1926, with appointment in the same month as a deputy director-general at the War Office. He was promoted to the rank of major-general in October 1926. He was appointed a Companion of the Order of the Bath (CB) in the 1928 Birthday Honours. He was appointed as the director-general of Army Medical Services in September 1929, at which point he was promoted to the rank of lieutenant-general. He was promoted to Knight Commander of the Order of the Bath (KCB) in the 1931 New Year Honours. Fawcus was presented with an honorary degree in civil law by Durham University in 1930. He served as the director-general of Army Medical Services until his retirement from active service in March 1934. Following his retirement he was replaced as the personal physician for George V by J. W. L. Scott. While serving as director-general, he won the General's Cup in golf at Sandwich in 1931.

He became the director-general of the British Red Cross in 1934, a position he would hold until 1938. He was appointed as the colonel commandant of the Royal Army Medical Corps in December 1938, a ceremonial role he would hold until he relinquished it in August 1941 on account of ill health. He was instrumental in developing professional opportunities for Royal Army Medical Corps personal and in revising the status of the Royal Army Medical College, both endeavours he self-funded at no cost to the state. He was a commissioner for the Royal Hospital Chelsea. He also presided over the Duke-Fingard Inhalation Treatment Centre in Kensington, where he sought to make advancements in the treatment of asthma. He died at the age of 71 at Hillingdon in October 1947, with his funeral service carried out in the Guards Chapel, Wellington Barracks.
