= South Charlton =

Village in Northumberland, England

Coordinates: 55.473600°N 1.742363°W

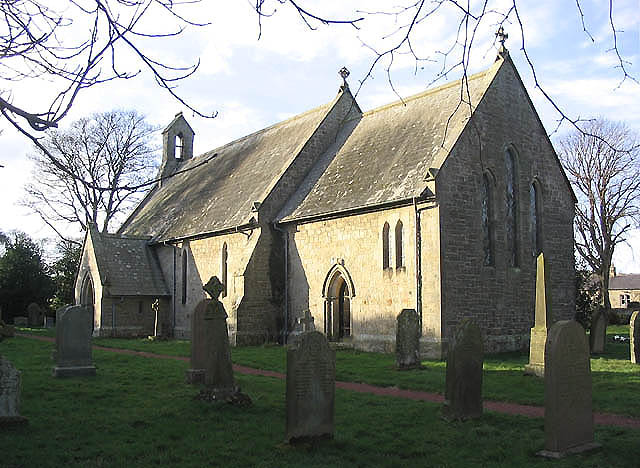
- South Charlton Church

- Location within Northumberland
- Civil parish: Eglingham
- Unitary authority: Northumberland
- Ceremonial county: Northumberland
- Region: North East
- Country: England
- Sovereign state: United Kingdom

South Charlton is a small village and former civil parish, now in the parish of Eglingham, in the county of Northumberland, England, five miles (8 km) north-west of Alnwick. In 1951 the parish had a population of 82.

The parish church of St. James, South Charlton was built in 1862 by James Deason of London for the 4th Duke of Northumberland, in an Early English style. It is a Grade II listed building.

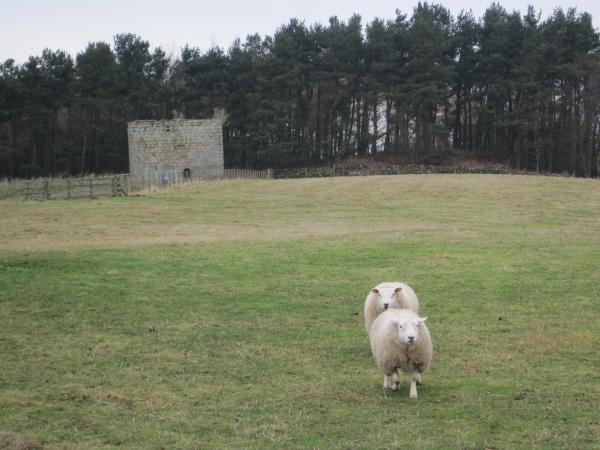
Heiferlaw Tower

Two miles (3.2 km) south-east of the village, on the slopes of Heifer Law, is Heiferlaw Tower, a ruined fifteenth-century pele tower built by the monks of Alnwick Abbey.

== Governance ==
South Charlton was formerly a township and chapelry in Ellingham parish, from 1866 South Charlton was a civil parish in its own right until it was abolished on 1 April 1955 and merged with Eglingham.

== Notable people ==
- Harold Fawcus (1876–1947), British Army general and first-class cricketer
