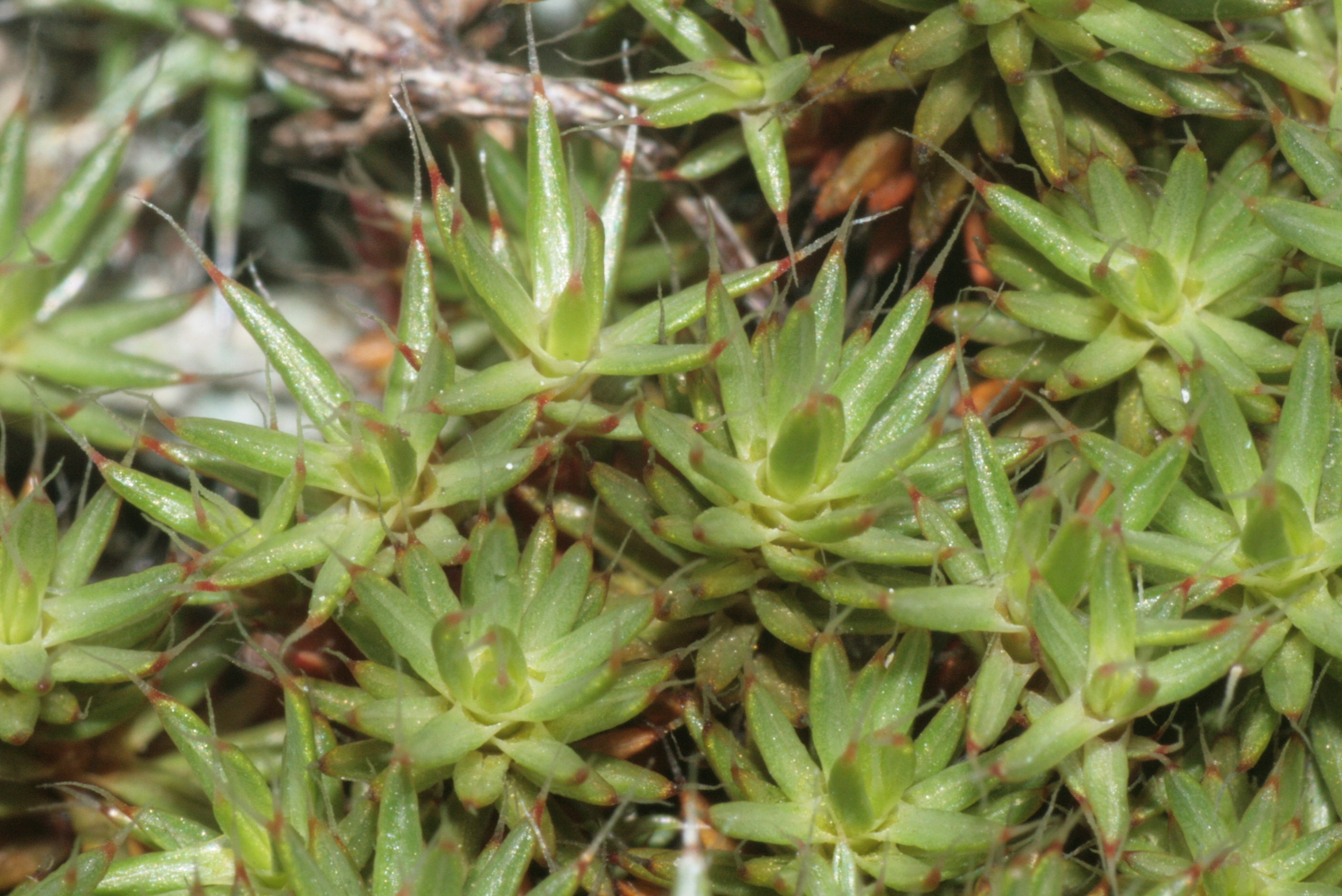

Scientific classification
- Kingdom: Plantae
- Division: Bryophyta
- Class: Polytrichopsida
- Order: Polytrichales
- Family: Polytrichaceae
- Genus: Polytrichum
- Species: P. piliferum

Binomial name
- Polytrichum piliferum Hedw.

Synonyms
- Synonyms: Polytrichum piliferum var alpestre Wulfsb.; Polytrichum piliferum var elegans Baur; Polytrichum piliferum var hoppei (Hornsch.) H.C. Hall; Polytrichum piliferum var hyperboreus (R.Br.) Müll. Hal.; Polytrichum piliferum var longisetum Bauer; Polytrichum piliferum var tectorum Warnst.; Polytrichum piliferum f Schiffneri Baur

= Polytrichum piliferum =

Species of moss

Polytrichum piliferum, the bristly haircap, is an evergreen perennial species of moss in the family Polytrichaceae. The bristly haircap moss is small-sized to medium-sized and forms loose tufts with wine-reddish stems. It is an acrocarpous moss that appears bluish-green to grey. This moss grows in clumps on erect shoots and becomes a red-brown colour as it grows older. The most distinguishing feature of P. piliferum is the long, white awn at the tips of the leaves, which also give this moss its grey colour. It is the only species in its genus where the awn is completely hyaline.

== Common names ==
In English the species goes by the common names polytrichum moss, bristly haircap, or bristly haircap moss. In Finnish its common name is karvakarhunsammal, while in German it is called Glashaar-Frauenhaarmoos, Glashaar-Haarmützenmoos, Glashaar-Widertonmoos, Haartragendes Frauenhaar-Moos, or Haartragendes Frauenhaarmoos.

== Distribution ==
Polytrichum piliferum has a bipolar, cosmopolitan distribution, occurring in suitable habitats on all continents including Antarctica. P. piliferum is less common than Polytrichum juniperinum and it often occurs in association with species of Cladonia. In sandy dry grass lands the species prevents higher plants from growing.

=== Habitat ===
It is found in similar habitats to Polytrichum juniperinum, however, P. piliferum prefers more open and exposed areas. P. piliferum also prefers a drier environment and is able to withstand temperatures as high as 90°C to 100°C. P. piliferum can also be frequently found in areas that are acidic and low in nutrients, therefore, they can be an excellent gauge for nutrient levels.

The habitat of P. piliferum includes shallow soil over outcrops, exposed sandy soils of banks, gravel cover, and disturbed areas. Other habitats of P. piliferum includes rocks on road banks or pastures. It is also found in shallow and drained sand or gravel, like in ground over rocks and boulders.

== Reproduction ==
P. piliferum is dioicous, meaning that it has separate male and female plants. To sexually reproduce, this moss utilizes the splash-cup mechanism to disperse the sperm it produces from its antheridia. The splash-cup mechanism occurs when raindrops splash onto the antheridia, collect sperm, and are hopefully splashed onto the female plant, where the sperm can swim to the archegonia.

== Gametophytic characteristics ==
=== Overall structure ===
Polytrichum piliferum grows close to the ground (about 4 cm or less) and forms dense clusters near the tip of the shoot, forcing the stem to be somewhat bare. The stem is tall, wiry, unbranched, and a dark-red colour. The calyptra of P. piliferum is hairy and a whitish-brown color.

=== Leaf structure ===
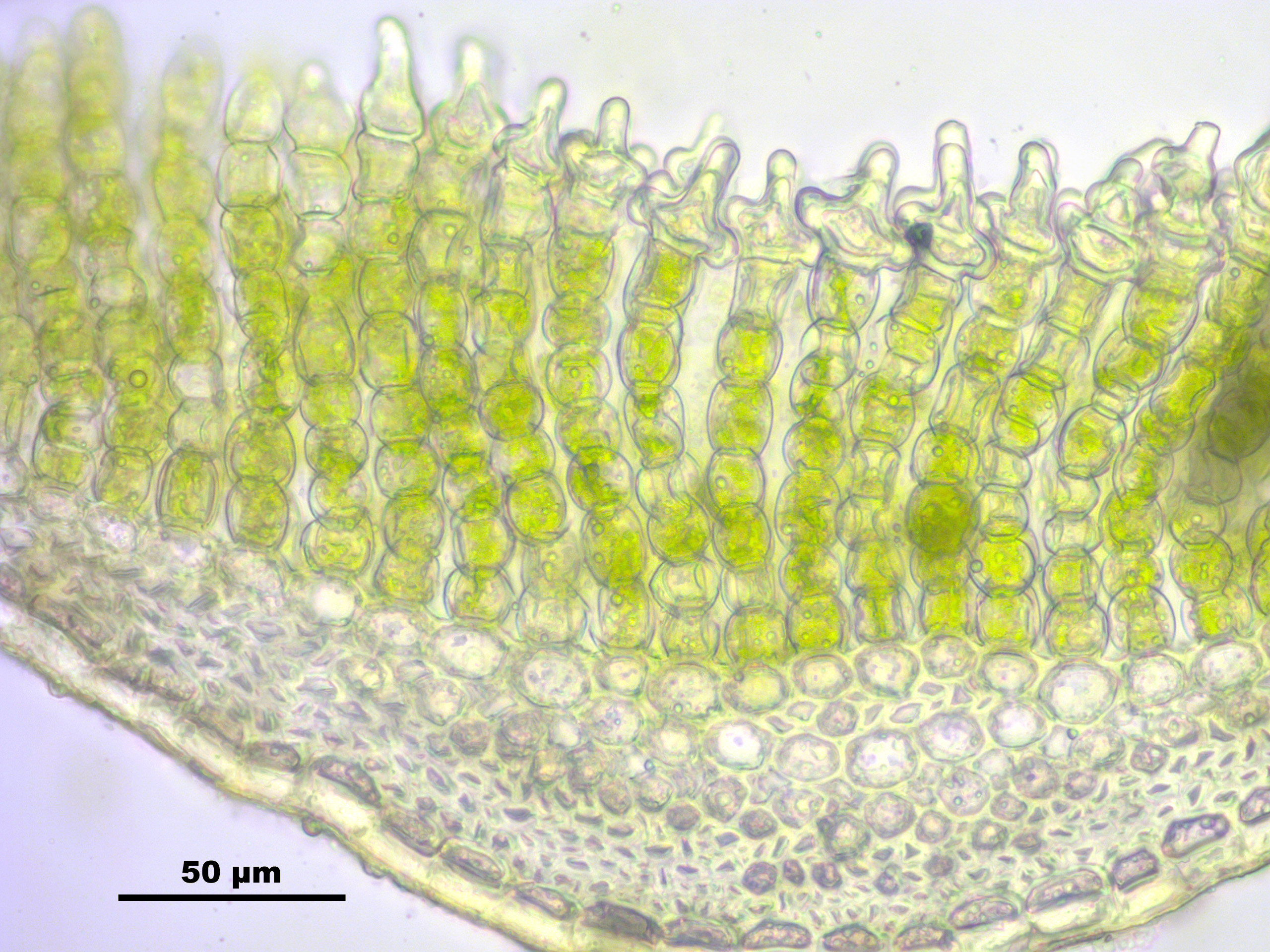
A cross section of the leaf photosynthetic lamellae of Polytrichum piliferum Male shoots of Polytrichum piliferum showing the reddish terminal 'flowers' that contain the antheridia A female plant of Polytrichum piliferum with attached sporophyte showing the hyaline leaf points

In P. piliferum, shorter leaves are located close together towards the tip of its red stems, giving the shoot a characteristic tapered shape. The leaves have a distinct white, hair-like awn at the leaf tip, in contrast to the short red-brown awns of P. juniperinum. These leaves can be anywhere from 4 mm to 7 mm long, although they may be shorter in dry areas. The leaves of P. piliferum are costate and often stand erect, straight, and slightly in-curved when dry, and erect-spreading when moist.

Polytrichum piliferum leaves possess parallel, longitudinal lamellae of photosynthetic tissue on their upper surfaces, which are a unique characteristic associated with the Polytrichopsida. Another distinguishing feature of P. piliferum are the in-curved leaf blades over the photosynthetic lamellae. The topmost cells of the lamellae in P. piliferum are smooth, and under a microscope, the cross section of each lamella appears 1 cell wide and 5 to 7 cells high.

=== Male gametophyte ===
In this species, the antheridia develop from cells below the leaves. The male shoots produce a dark-red, terminal antheridia that is surrounded by a cup-shaped whorl of perigonial leaves that resembles a flower.

== Sporophytic characteristics ==
The sporophytes of P. piliferum are common and usually reach maturity during the summer. The sporangia are cube-like and inclined, but become more horizontal when mature. They are borne on the red-brown seta that is approximately 1 cm to 3 cm in height.

== Conservation status ==
P. piliferum is ranked globally as secure (G5) as of 1/26/2015, meaning that this species is at a very low risk of becoming globally extinct due to an abundant population. In Canada, Polytrichum pilifeurm is ranked as secure (N5), meaning that this species has a very low risk of becoming extinct in Canada due to a high presence in an extensive habitat.
