= Beanley =

Village in Northumberland, in England

Coordinates: 55.460°N 1.867°W

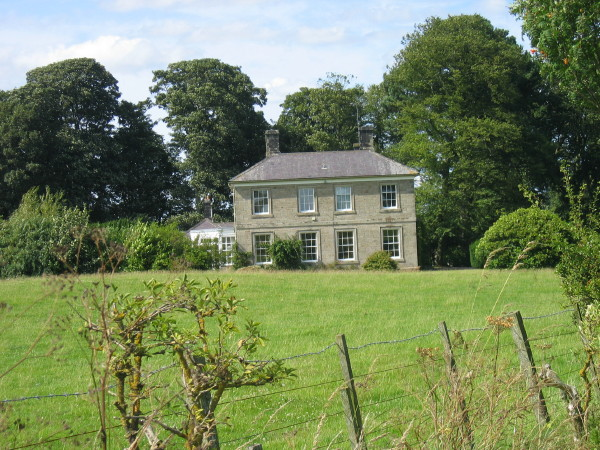
- Beanley Hall

- Location within Northumberland
- OS grid reference: NU085185
- Civil parish: Hedgeley
- Unitary authority: Northumberland
- Shire county: Northumberland
- Region: North East
- Country: England
- Sovereign state: United Kingdom
- Post town: ALNWICK
- Postcode district: NE66
- Police: Northumbria
- Fire: Northumberland
- Ambulance: North East
- UK Parliament: Berwick-upon-Tweed

Beanley is a village and former civil parish, now in the parish of Hedgeley in the county of Northumberland, England. It is situated to the north-west of Alnwick, near Eglingham. In 1951 the parish had a population of 53.

In 1870–1872, John Marius Wilson's Imperial Gazetteer of England and Wales described Beanley as "a township in Eglingham parish, Northumberland; on the river Breamish, 7 miles NW of Alnwick. Acres, 2,341. Pop., 116. Houses, 23. The earls of Dunbar anciently held it on the tenure of maintaining a road into Scotland. A cross stands on Hedgeley-moor, at a short distance from the village, erected to the memory of Sir Ralph Percy, who fell in 1464 in a battle with the Yorkists."

== Governance ==
Beanley is in the parliamentary constituency of Berwick-upon-Tweed. Beanley was formerly a township in Eglingham parish, from 1866 Beanley was a civil parish in its own right until it was abolished on 1 April 1955 and merged with Hedgeley.

== See also ==
- Bewick and Beanley Moors SSSI
