= Bassington =

Township in Eglingham parish, Northumberland, England

Coordinates: 55.442°N 1.772°W

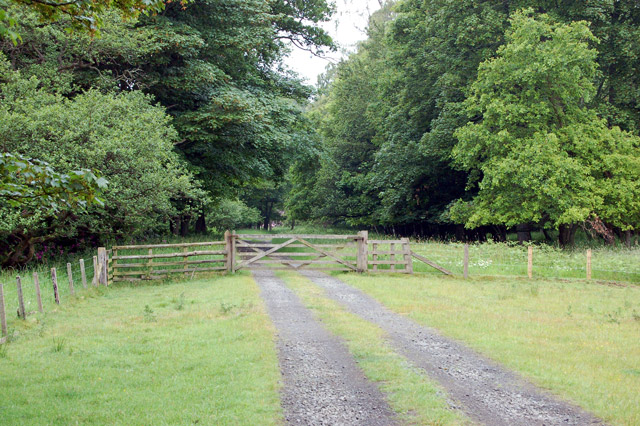
- Near Cat Heugh

- Location within Northumberland
- OS grid reference: NU145165
- Civil parish: Eglingham
- Unitary authority: Northumberland
- Shire county: Northumberland
- Region: North East
- Country: England
- Sovereign state: United Kingdom
- Post town: ALNWICK
- Postcode district: NE66
- Police: Northumbria
- Fire: Northumberland
- Ambulance: North East
- UK Parliament: Berwick-upon-Tweed

Bassington is a former civil parish, now in the parish of Eglingham, in the county of Northumberland, England. It is located about 3 miles (5 km) northwest of Alnwick. Bassington is traversed by the River Aln. In 1951 the parish had a population of 2.

== Governance ==
Bassington is in the parliamentary constituency of Berwick-upon-Tweed. Bassington was formerly a township in Eglingham parish, from 1866 Bassington was a civil parish in its own right until it was abolished on 1 April 1955 and merged with Eglingham.
