= John Ditchburn =

Australian cartoonist

John Ditchburn is an Australian cartoonist who has contributed to the Ballarat Courier, Eureka Street, the Independent Monthly, Border Mail, and the Australasian Post. Ditchburn is a two-time winner of the Quill Award for Best Cartoon (2006 and 2013).
