= Hepburn, Northumberland =

Hamlet in Northumberland, England

Coordinates: 55°30′51″N 1°53′55″W

Hepburn
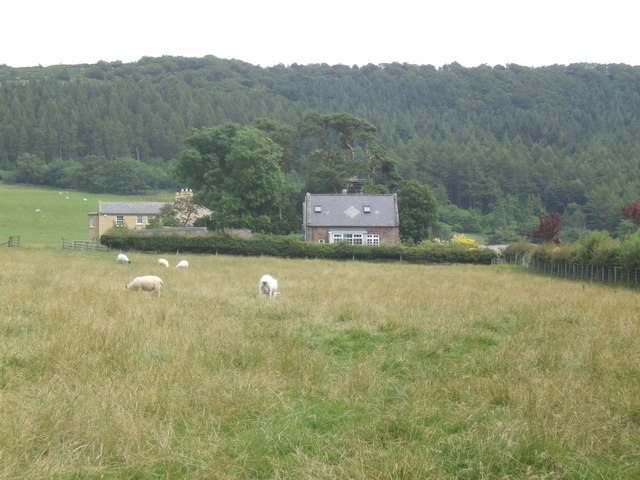

- Location within Northumberland
- Civil parish: Chillingham
- Unitary authority: Northumberland
- Ceremonial county: Northumberland
- Region: North East
- Country: England
- Sovereign state: United Kingdom

Hepburn is a hamlet and former civil parish, now in the parish of Chillingham in the county of Northumberland, England. In 1951 the parish had a population of 43.

== Toponymy ==
The standard authorities give Hepburn as in origin an Old English name deriving from heah 'high' + byrgen 'burial mound'.

== Governance ==
Hepburn was formerly a township in the parish of Chillingham, in 1866 Hepburn became a separate civil parish, on 1 April 1955 the parish was abolished and merged with Chillingham. From 1974 to 2009 it was in Berwick-upon-Tweed district.

== See also ==
- Bewick and Beanley Moors SSSI
