= Jim Ditchburn =

- Born: Albert James Ditchburn; 24 August 1908; Boulder, Western Australia
- Died: 7 March 1964 (aged 55); Perth, Western Australia
Australian rules football career
Personal information
- Original team: Midland "B" Grade
Playing career^{1}
Years	Club	Games (Goals)
1929–1931	Subiaco	
1932–1936	South Fremantle	93
1937–1939	Swan Districts	52 (65)
- ^{1} Playing statistics correct to the end of 1939.
- Cricket career

Cricket information

Domestic team information
- Years: Team
- 1933–1934: Western Australia
- FC debut: 10 February 1933 Western Australia v South Australia
- Last FC: 31 October 1934 Western Australia v MCC

Career statistics
Competition	First-class
Matches	9
Runs scored	127
Batting average	12.70
100s/50s	0/0
Top score	27*
Balls bowled	1,839
Wickets	22
Bowling average	30.63
5 wickets in innings	0
10 wickets in match	0
Best bowling	4/46
Catches/stumpings	9/–
- Source: CricketArchive (subscription required), 16 September 2017

Albert James Ditchburn (24 August 1908 – 7 March 1964) was an Australian sportsman who represented Western Australia in both Australian rules football and first-class cricket. He played and coached in the Western Australian National Football League (WANFL) during the 1930s.

Ditchburn, who was born in the Western Australian goldfields, started his league career in 1929 with Subiaco. He crossed to South Fremantle in 1932 and put together 93 games for the club, during which time he made the first of his ten interstate football appearances with Western Australia. Used by his state both in the ruck and as a half forward flanker, Ditchburn twice captained Western Australia to wins over South Australia in 1938. By then he was at his third WANFL club, Swan Districts, who had secured his services as captain-coach prior to the 1937 season. He had played his early football in Midland and was thus the first local to coach Swan Districts. In the three years he was in charge of the club, Ditchburn twice steered them to finals, with third-place finishes in 1937 and 1938. He briefly coached South Fremantle in 1946, after the sudden resignation of Neil Lewington.

A right-arm medium pace bowler, Ditchburn played nine first-class matches for the Western Australian cricket team, all in 1934 and 1935. He took 22 wickets at 30.63, with his best innings and match figures coming in his final appearance, against the Marylebone Cricket Club at the WACA Ground. His first innings figures of 4 for 46 consisted entirely of present and future England Test cricketers, James Langridge, Joe Hardstaff, Jim Parks and Wilf Barber.
