= Hunterheugh Crags =

- Moorland
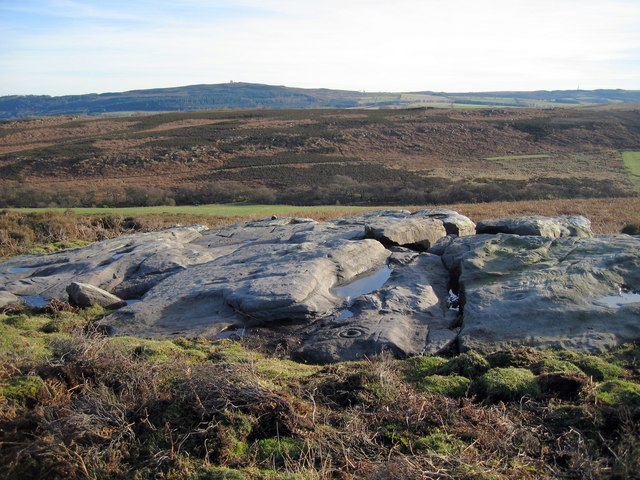
- The cup-and-ring marked outcrop at Hunterheugh Crags

- Location in Northumberland
- Coordinates: 55.446°N 1.816°W
- Grid position: NU117168
- Location: Northumberland, England, UK

Hunterheugh Crags are part of the Fellsandstone escarpment, 5 miles (8 km) north west of Alnwick, Northumberland, England and 9 miles (14 km) from the coast. The site is moorland forming part of the Bewick and Beanley Moors SSSI, although before the Bronze Age it is likely to have been thickly forested with broadleaf deciduous trees. This site is most famous for the cup and ring mark art present on the outcrop.

== Place-name meaning ==
Hunterheugh derives from Old English huntor "hunter" and hoh "hill-spur".

== Rock art ==
The first phase of the carvings is all on the natural rock surface and these are now very heavily weathered. The motifs incorporate undulations of the surface into their design so that most are connected by artificial grooves or by a natural rock slope which allows water to flow from one design to the next. This phase is believed to be Neolithic, and probably early Neolithic at that. This is supported by the discovery of what appears to be a broken sandstone axehead 1.2 m from the carved rock outcrop at the base of the topsoil. Such ground and polished axeheads are known from elsewhere in Northumberland.

Phase 1 of the carvings was broken through when the rock dome was quarried at a later date. New carvings were then made on the surfaces exposed by quarrying. These show no attempt to take undulations and variations in the rock (with one exception), none of the designs are inter-connected, and the shapes are more varied and more crudely executed. This phase is believed to be Early Bronze Age in date and appears to imitate the earlier tradition, but does not share the same sense of positioning.

== See also ==
- Ballochmyle cup and ring marks
