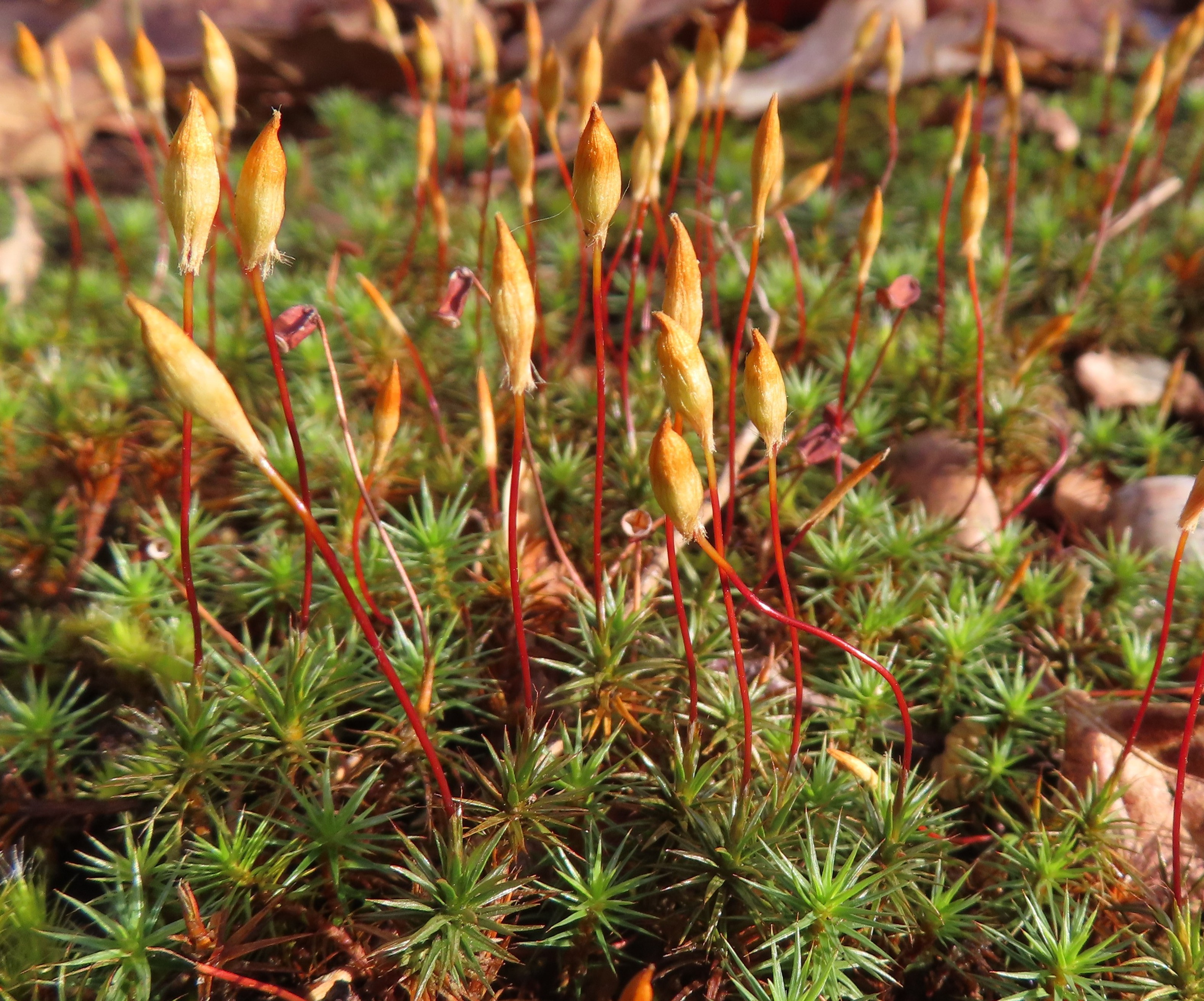

Scientific classification
- Kingdom: Plantae
- Clade: Embryophytes
- Division: Bryophyta
- Class: Polytrichopsida
- Order: Polytrichales
- Family: Polytrichaceae
- Genus: Polytrichum
- Species: P. juniperinum

Binomial name
- Polytrichum juniperinum Hedw.

= Polytrichum juniperinum =

Species of moss

Polytrichum juniperinum, commonly known as juniper haircap or juniper polytrichum moss, is an evergreen and perennial species of moss that is widely distributed, growing on every continent including Antarctica.

== Description ==
The stems are reddish with grey-green leaves that have a distinctive red-brown tip. This characteristic allows them to be separated from the bristly haircap (Polytrichum piliferum), a plant that the juniper haircap moss closely resembles. The difference is that the bristly haircap has a clear (white) leaf tip. The leaves of juniper haircap moss are lanceolate and upright-spreading when dry, and wide-spreading when moist. Although their growth form can vary, they generally form thin, interwoven mats rather than growing as closely associated individual plants. Juniper haircap moss have a well-developed system of tiny tubes for carrying water from the rhizoids to leaves that is uncharacteristic of mosses, resembling the system that has evolved in vascular plants such as ferns, gymnosperms and angiosperms. As a result of this developed system, stems have greater potential for height than in typical mosses.

== Habitat and ecology ==
Juniper haircap moss grows across a wide range of habitats but it is most commonly found on dry, acidic, exposed habitats. It is frequent in areas previously disturbed by fire and logging. Other areas they occupy are mineral soil, humus and rocks, stumps, banks, trailsides and dry open woods. Although Juniper haircap moss is not usually found in moist or wet environments, it has been found growing on moist woods and other moist sites such as streambanks.

In Britain, it is common in upland grassland such as U1 Festuca ovina community as well as in acid woodlands, especially W16 Quercus petraea woods. It is also found in various types of heathland.

== Reproduction ==
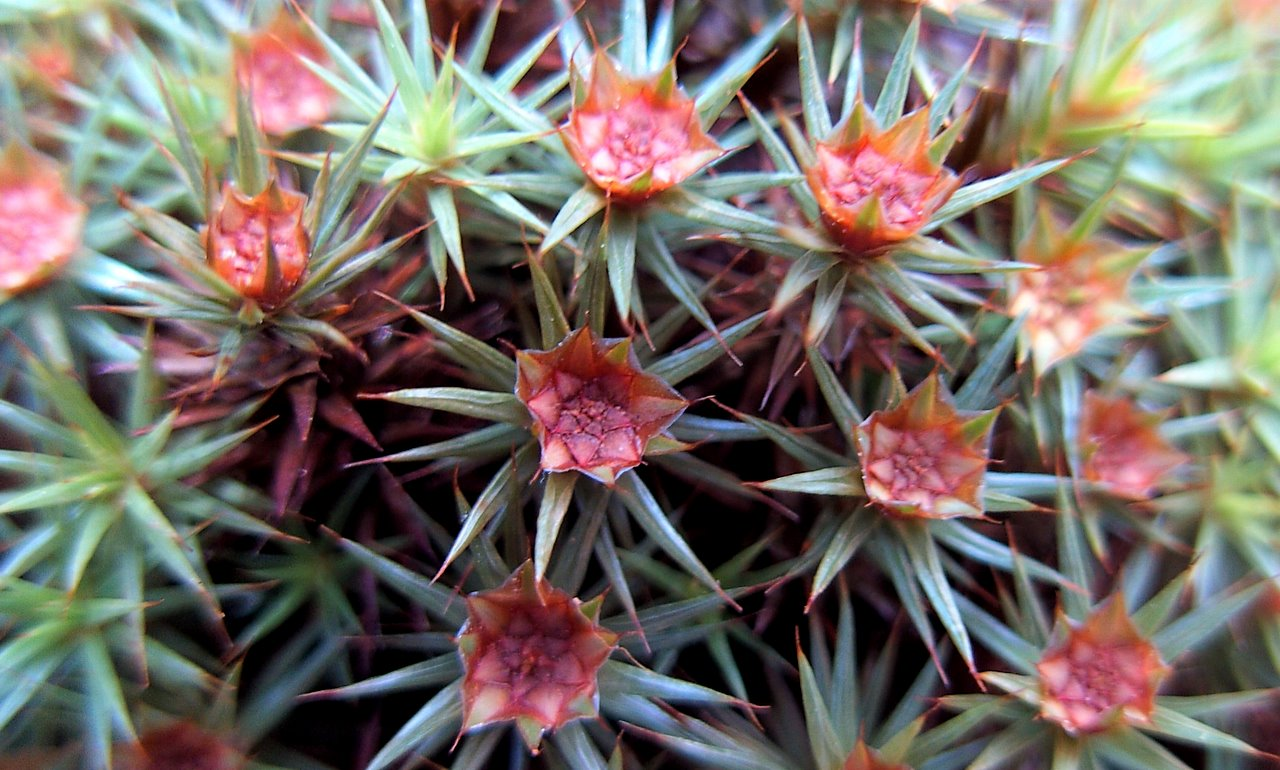
The male reproductive structures of Polytrichum juniperinum.

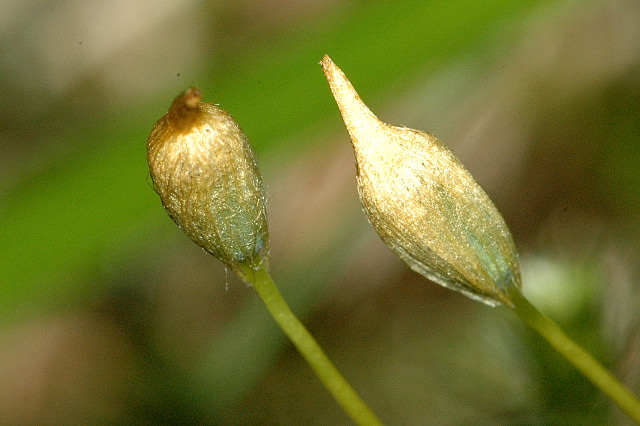
The sporophyte of Polytrichum juniperinum.

It is a dioecious plant, meaning that the male and female gametophytes are on separate plants. Juniper haircap moss have very obvious male and female parts. Male plants are said to be unusual because they continue growing without losing the old male organs. The male plants are very noticeable due to their bright reddish orange modified leaves that form small terminal 'flowers' at the shoot ends. The plant has a gametophyte dominant life cycle similar to other mosses. Water is required for reproduction to take place, to enable the sperm to swim down the neck of the archegonia to reach the egg. After fertilization, the sporophyte of the juniper haircap moss grows on the female gametophyte, emerging from the archegonia. The sporophyte consists of a foot, which anchors it to the archegonia, a stalk, and a spore capsule. There are 64 short blunt teeth at the top surrounding the capsule mouth and the hood of the capsule, the calyptra, has long hairs that extends down the entire length of the capsule, hence the name 'haircap moss'.
