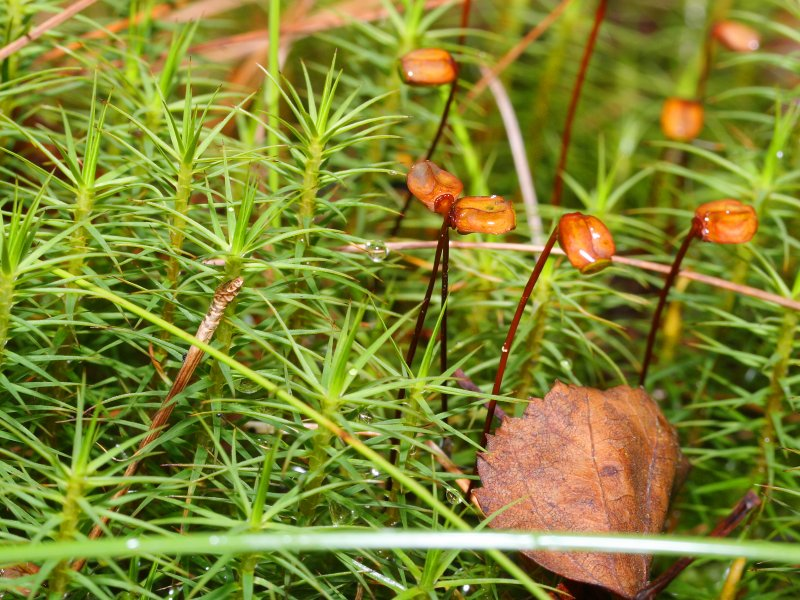
- Plants of Polytrichum commune

Conservation status
- Secure (NatureServe)

Scientific classification
- Kingdom: Plantae
- Clade: Embryophytes
- Division: Bryophyta
- Class: Polytrichopsida
- Order: Polytrichales
- Family: Polytrichaceae
- Genus: Polytrichum
- Species: P. commune

Binomial name
- Polytrichum commune Hedw.

= Polytrichum commune =

Species of moss

Polytrichum commune (also known as common haircap, great golden maidenhair, great goldilocks, common haircap moss, or common hair moss) is a species of moss found in many regions with high humidity and rainfall. The species can be exceptionally tall for a moss with stems often exceeding 30 cm (12 in) and rarely reaching 70 cm (27.5 in), but it is most commonly found at shorter lengths of 5 to 10 cm (2 to 4 in). It is widely distributed throughout temperate and boreal latitudes in the Northern Hemisphere and also found in Mexico, several Pacific Islands including New Zealand, and also in Australia. It typically grows in bogs, wet heathland and along forest streams. Additionally, class Polytrichopsida has been shown to thrive in partially open habitats that have been recently disturbed by human activities or even livestock.

== Description ==
Polytrichum commune is a medium to large moss. It is dark green in colour, but becomes brownish with age. The stems can occur in either loose or quite dense tufts, often forming extensive colonies. The stems are most typically found at lengths of 5 to 10 cm (2.0 to 3.9 in), but can be as short as 2 cm (0.79 in) or as long as 70 cm (28 in). They range in stiffness from erect to decumbent (i.e. reclining) and are usually unbranched, though in rare cases they may be forked. The leaves occur densely to rather distantly, and bracts are present proximally.

The leaves typically measure 6 to 8 mm (0.24 to 0.31 in) in length, but may be up to 12 mm (0.47 in) long. When dry they are erect, but when moist they are sinuous with recurved tips and are generally spreading to broadly recurved, or sharply recurved from the base. The leaf sheath is oblong to elliptic in outline, forming an involute (i.e. with inward rolling margins) tube and clasping the stem. This sheath is typically golden yellow and shiny, and it is abruptly contracted to the narrowly lanceolate blade. Using a microscope, the marginal lamina can be seen to be level or erect, narrow, and typically 2 to 3 cells wide, though sometimes as many as 7 cells wide. It is toothed from the base of the blade up to the apex, with the teeth being unicellular and embedded in the margin. The costa, or central stalk of the leaf, is toothed on the underside near the apex, and is excurrent, meaning it extends beyond the end of the apex, ending in a short, rough awn.

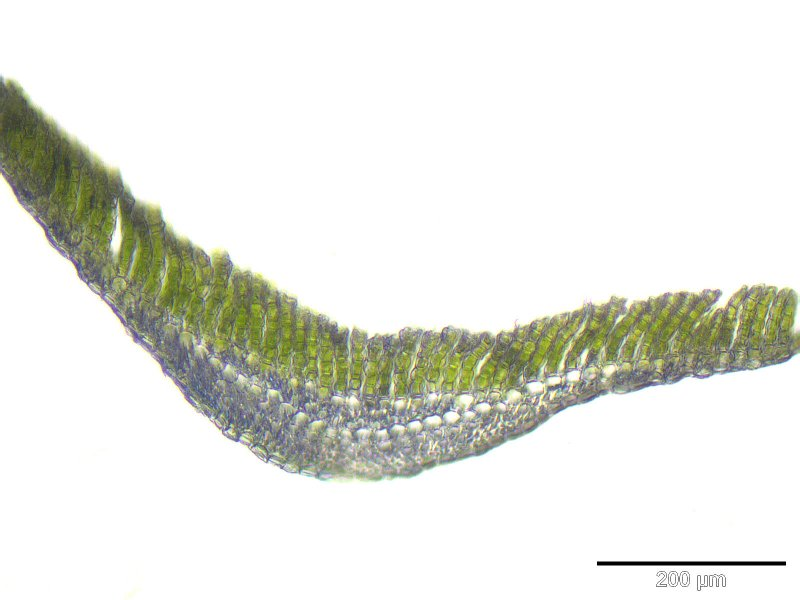
Cross section of a leaf showing parallel lamellae (perpendicular to leaf surface) at 125x magnification

The lamellae, ridges of cells that run along the leaf surface, are crenulate (i.e. with small rounded teeth) in profile and are 5 to 9 cells high. Their margins are distinctly grooved with 2 rows of paired, projecting knobs. The marginal cells, when observed in section, may be narrow, but are more typically enlarged and wider than those beneath. They are retuse (i.e. with a rounded apex with a central shallow notch) to deeply notched, and in rare cases are divided by a vertical partition. These cells are smooth and brownish in colour and have relatively thick cell walls. The sheath cells measure 60 to 90 μm (0.0024 to 0.0035 in) long by 10 to 13 μm (0.00039 to 0.00051 in) wide. These cells may be elongated rectangles or strongly linear structures up to 20 times long as wide. They become narrower toward the margins. Marginal lamina cells are 10 to 15 μm (0.00039 to 0.00059 in) wide and are subquadrate (i.e. nearly square).

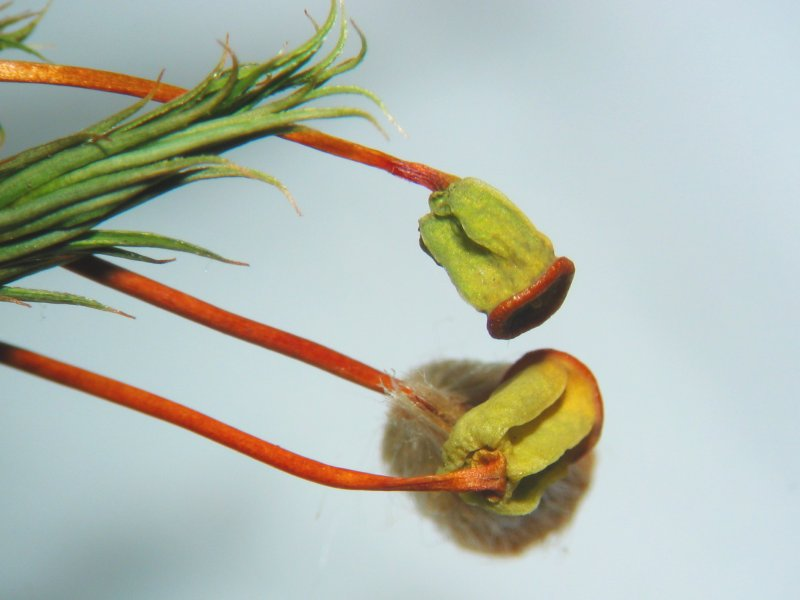
Close-up of capsules (after shedding of calyptra)

The plants are sexually dioicous. Fertilization occurs when raindrops splash sperm from male splash-cups onto female plants containing eggs. The fertilized egg develops into a sporophyte, which contains a spore capsule high above a stalk. The leaves of the perichaetium have a long sheath with a scarious (i.e. membranous) margin, while the blades themselves are greatly reduced, gradually narrowing to a finely acuminate tip. These blades have toothed margins, are denticulate to subentire in outline, roughened to almost smooth, and have a costa that is excurrent. The seta, or capsule stalk, is 5 to 9 cm (2.0 to 3.5 in) long, and is stout and yellowish to reddish brown in colour. The capsule is 3 to 6 mm (0.12 to 0.24 in) long, slightly rectangular to cubic in shape, and brown to dark reddish brown in colour. It is sharply 4 winged, inclined to horizontal, and glaucous when fresh. The peristome measures 250 μm, is pale in colour and has 64 teeth. The peristome of the Haircap Moss is specifically known as nematodontous, meaning it consists of multiple layers of intact cells. The calyptra is golden yellow to brownish and completely envelops the capsule. The spores measure 5 to 8 μm (0.00020 to 0.00031 in), but may be up to 12 μm (0.00047 in).

== Physiology ==
Polytrichum commune is an endohydric moss, meaning water must be conducted from the base of the plant. While mosses are considered non-vascular plants, Polytrichum commune shows clear differentiation of water conducting tissue. One of these water conducting tissues is termed the hadrom, which makes up the central cylinder of stem tissue. It consists of cells with a relatively wide diameter called hydroids, which conduct water. This tissue is analogous to xylem in higher plants. The other tissue is called leptom, which surround the hadrom and contains smaller cells. This tissue is, on the other hand, analogous to phloem. When these two tissue types are taken into account along with the species' exceptional height, it becomes clear that common haircap moss is quite a unique moss considering that the majority of species show little differentiation of conducting tissue and are restricted to much smaller stem lengths.

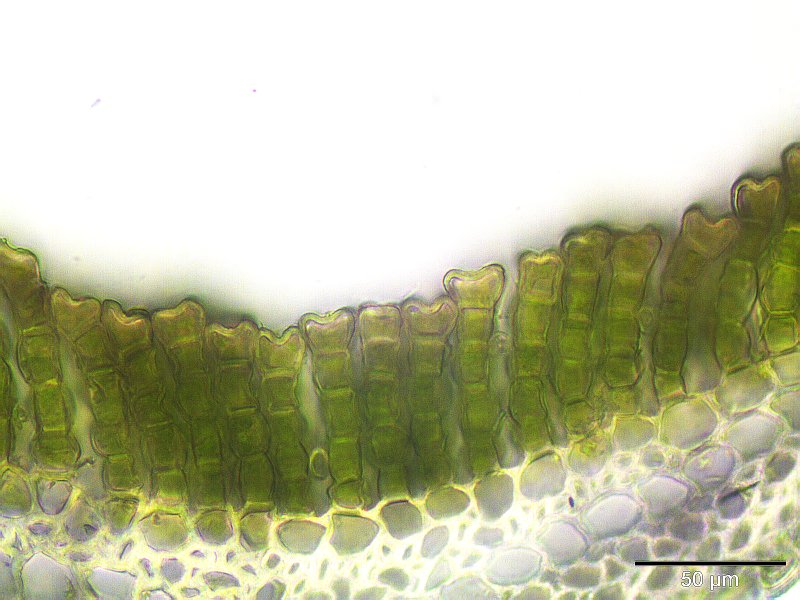
Cross section of a leaf showing parallel photosynthetic lamellae at 400x magnification. The green cells contain chloroplasts.

Another characteristic feature of the species (and the genus) is its parallel photosynthetic lamellae on the upper surfaces of the leaves. Most mosses simply have a single plate of cells on the leaf surface, but common haircap moss has more highly differentiated photosynthetic tissue. This is an example of a xeromorphic adaption, an adaptation for dry conditions. Moist air is trapped in between the rows of lamellae, while the larger terminal cells act to contain moisture and protect the photosynthetic cells. This minimises water loss as relatively little tissue is directly exposed to the environment, but allows for enough gas exchange for photosynthesis to take place. The microenvironment between the lamellae can host a number of microscopic organisms such as parasitic fungi and rotifers. Additionally, the leaves will curve and then twist around the stem when conditions become too dry, this being another xeromorphic adaptation. It is speculated that the teeth along the leaf's edge may aid in this process, or perhaps also that they help discourage small invertebrates from attacking the leaves.

== Variety ==
- Polytrichum commune var. commune
- Polytrichum commune var. jensenii (I. Hagen) Mönk. ex Frye
- Polytrichum commune var. perigoniale (Michx.) Hampe
