= Ditchburn Boats =

Ditchburn Boats is the popular name for a manufacturer of wooden pleasure craft launches and racing boats located in Gravenhurst, Ontario, on Lake Muskoka. At one time the company was the largest boat manufacturer in the lake region. Ditchburn operated from 1871 until approximately the 1930s building wooden rowboats and canoes early in its history, and later gasoline-powered launches.

== Early history ==
The Ditchburn Pleasure Boats Ltd was established in 1871 on Lake Muskoka by Henry Ditchburn to build wooden pleasure boats and launches. Joined by his brothers, William, John, and Arthur began by building wooden rowboats in Lake Rosseau, and moved to in Gravenhurst, Ontario, in 1890. The company began building gasoline launches in 1898 along with rowboats.

== Launches ==
In 1904 the enterprise was run by Henry's nephew, Herb Ditchburn, who partnered with Tom Greavette to reorganize the firm as the H. Ditchburn Boat Manufacturing Company. The firm built many custom-built gasoline launches along with some stock models, mostly consisting of rear-cockpit configuration with engine forward. In 1910 the company's line included 26 to 30 foot launches. In the late 1920s Ditchburn began selling forward-cockpit designs. His was the largest operation on Lake Muskoka, employing 30 men in 1921, expanding to 60 by 1923; sales building on the success of the company's Rainbow racing boats. Ditchburn met the ever-increasing demand for gasoline-powered launches by opening a second plant in Orillia, Ontario, in the mid-1920s, increasing employment to 130 men. It expanded its market to the United States, where eventually half the company's production was shipped.

The company was impacted by the Great Depression, experiencing its first layoff in July 1930. Slow orders were compounded by the opening of Greavette's boats in 1931, dividing a smaller market between two competitors. That year, two-thirds of the Gravenhurst plant had been laid off as orders declined, and a potentially lifesaving government order was produced at the larger Orillia shop because Gravenhurst was too small. The company succumbed to the Great Depression, folding in April 1932. It reorganized and reopened 9 March 1933 in a smaller plant. The company survived for a few years, but failed again in 1936, and was again reorganized. The company failed for a third and final time in 1938.

Herb Ditchburn later went to work with Gar Wood during World War II, and died in 1950.

== Ditchburn racing boats ==
Ditchburn was known for building a number of internationally known racing boats named Rainbow, having been commissioned by Harry Greening in 1919. Greening ran the Rainbow series in the Gold Cup races. Rainbow III, developed as Greening's entry into the 1923 Gold Cup was a 25-foot boat powered by a Packard Six engine. While the boat failed to win the race due to a malfunctioning rudder, Greening later set a distance record with it on Lake Muskoka running 1,064 miles in 24 hours.

Some controversy surrounded Greening's Rainbow IV, built in 1924. The Gold Cup Race rules barred hydroplanes, but allowed lapstrake hulls. Rainbow IV was a lapstrake boat, but was planked crosswise rather than fore-aft, thereby giving her a number of steps on the bottom of her hull. While the design was challenged, it was eventually allowed and Greening ran the race, winning on points. However, the victory was overturned when the American Power Boat Association upheld the challenge to the design. The Rainbow VII built in 1928 was a 38-foot racer powered by two engines developing 1,200 horsepower and won the Lipton Trophy in Detroit while carrying eight people.

In 1927 the company built a 28-foot racer for circus magnate John Ringling of the Ringling Bros. and Barnum & Bailey Circus fame named Silver Queen. This became the model of one of the company's most popular line of launches, the Viking built between 1928 and 1931. At the same time the company developed a 31-foot line known as the Commodore model. Both models sported a raised deck over the engine to accommodate the larger engines then coming into use.

In 1926 the company build six patrol boats for the Canadian government for use on the Atlantic coast based on the company's "Viking" model.
