= D. longiseta =

D. longiseta may refer to:

- Dawsonia longiseta, a species of moss native to Australia
- Diaphorus longiseta, a species of long-legged fly
- Dichaetomyia longiseta, a species of muscid fly
- Dichelachne longiseta, a taxonomic synonym of the grass species Pentapogon crinitus
- Drosophila longiseta, a species of fruit fly
