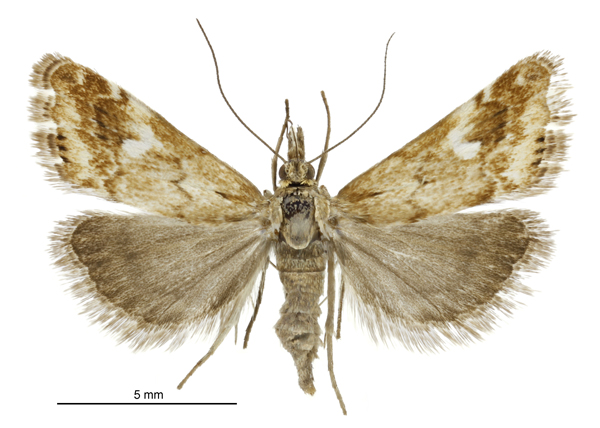
- Female
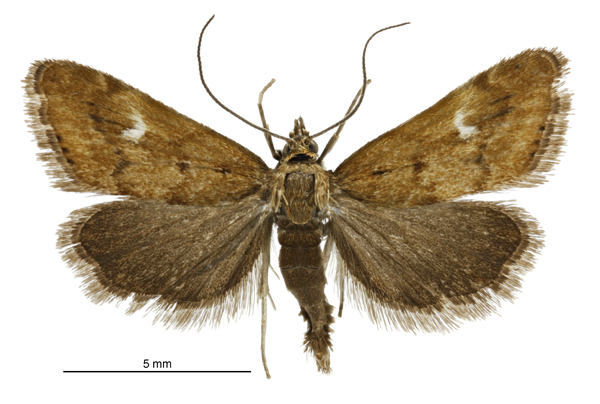
- Male

Scientific classification
- Kingdom: Animalia
- Phylum: Arthropoda
- Clade: Pancrustacea
- Class: Insecta
- Order: Lepidoptera
- Family: Crambidae
- Subfamily: Crambinae
- Tribe: Diptychophorini
- Genus: Glaucocharis
- Species: G. helioctypa

Binomial name
- Glaucocharis helioctypa (Meyrick, 1882)

Synonyms
- Diptychophora helioctypa Meyrick, 1882; Pareromene helioctypa (Meyrick, 1882)

= Glaucocharis helioctypa =

Species of moth endemic to New Zealand

Glaucocharis helioctypa is a moth in the family Crambidae. It was first described by Edward Meyrick in 1882. It is endemic to New Zealand and is only found in the South Island. It can be found throughout the South Island and inhabits native forest in lowland to subalpine altitudes. It has an affinity for damp grassy open situations near native forest or scrub. Larvae of Glaucocharis species feed on mosses and liverworts. Adults are on the wing from November until February. It is dayflying and has been observed flying low over cushion bogs and moss fields. Adults have also been observed flying actively in the hottest sunshine.

== Taxonomy ==
This species was first described by Edward Meyrick in 1882 and named Diptychophora helioctypa. Meyrick gave a fuller description of this species in 1883. George Hudson discussed and illustrated this species under that name in his 1928 book The butterflies and moths of New Zealand. In 1971 David Edward Gaskin placed this species in the genus Pareromene. However in 1985 Gaskin recognised that Glaucocharis must take precedence over Pareromene and placed G. helioctypa into that genus. The male lectotype, collected at Lake Wakatipu by R. W. Fereday is held at the Natural History Museum, London.

== Description ==
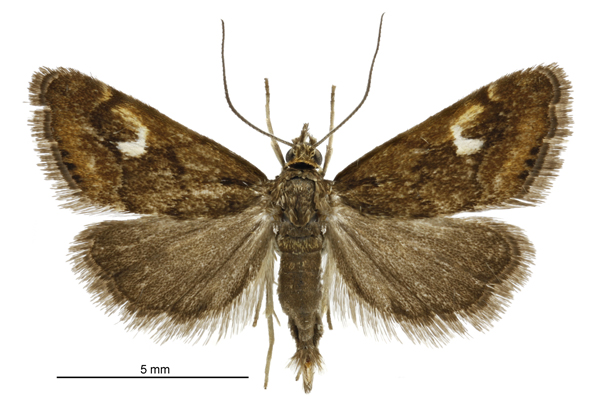
Darker version of male specimen

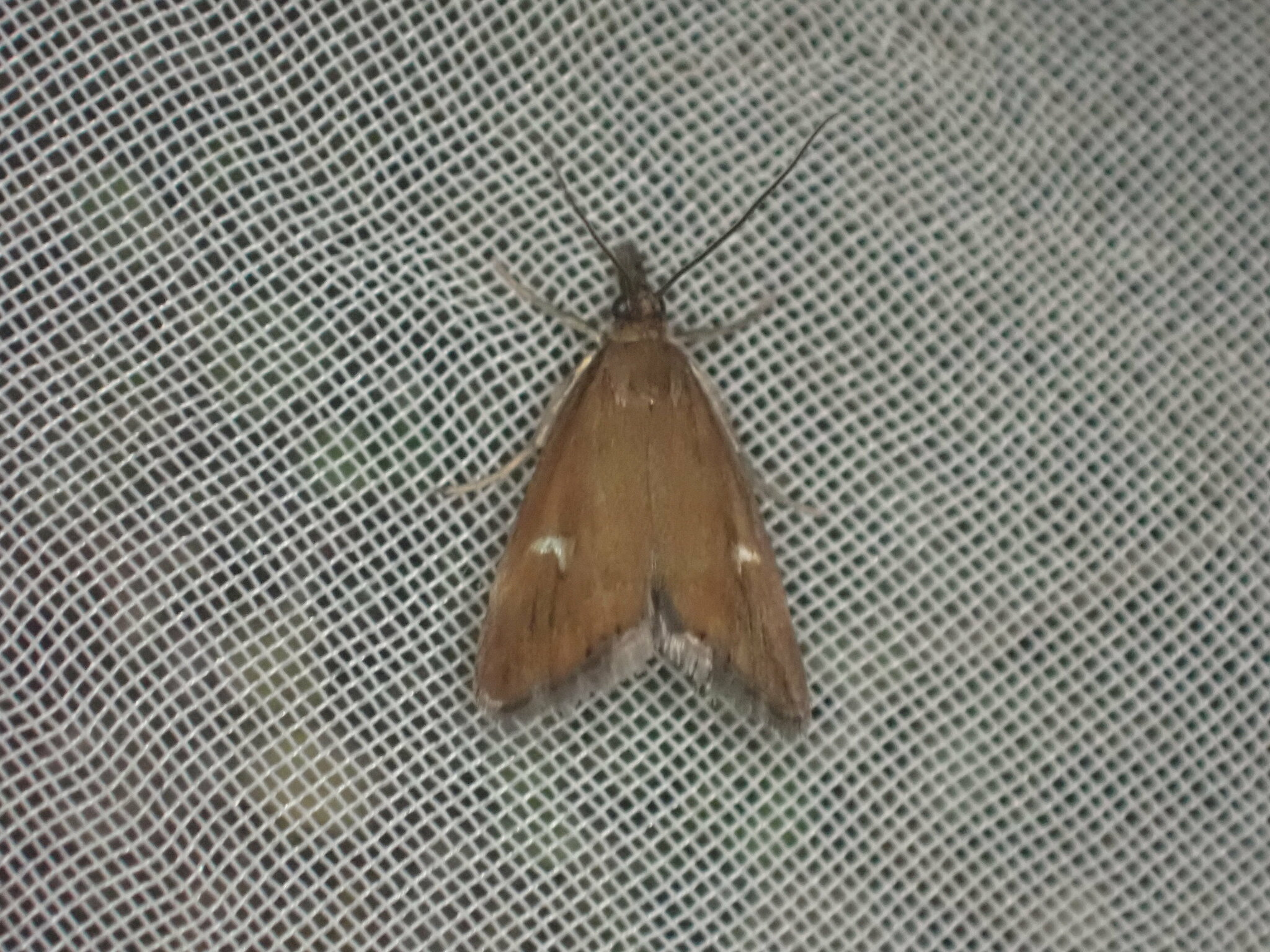
Brown colouring extends over the surface of the forewings.

Meyrick described this species as follows:

Male, female. — 14-15 mm. Head, palpi, and thorax rather dark greyish-fuscous mixed with whitish-ochreous, palpi white at base beneath. Antennae dark fuscous. Abdomen fuscous-grey, irrorated with ochreous towards base, apex whitish-ochreous. Legs grey, posterior pale whitish-grey. Forewings triangular, moderate, not very strongly dilated, costa nearly straight, slightly sinuate in middle, apex rounded, hindmargin oblique, both sinuations slight; very pale whitish-ochreous, almost wholly irregularly suffused with ochreous-fuscous, except an ill-defined patch in disc before first line, another on costa beyond middle, and a third extending along lower two-thirds of hindmargin; a well-defined slender dark fuscous transverse line from costa at 2/5 to inner margin before middle, hardly curved outwards, thrice rather strongly and irregularly dentate; a second dark fuscous transverse line from costa at 3/4 to inner margin a little before anal angle, followed by a pale line of the ground-colour, margined posteriorly by the ochreous-fuscous suffusion, upper half irregularly curved outwards, lower half curved inwards, slightly sinuate above inner margin; a small irregularly oval clear white spot in disc beyond middle, suffusedly connected above with the pale costal patch; three small dark ochreous-fuscous spots near together on hindmargin below middle : cilia ochreous-grey-whitish, with a fuscous line near base, and an ill-defined white spot in each sinuation. Hindwings dark fuscous-grey; cilia grey-whitish, with a dark grey line near base.

Meyrick stated that this species could be distinguished from its sister species as a result of its dark fuscous-grey hindwings, the slightness of the hindmarginal sinuations and that there are no metallic markings on the forewings.

Hudson explained that this species varies considerably in the extent of the warm brown colouring, which occasionally extends over the entire surface of the fore-wings.

Dark specimens of G. helioctypa can possibly be confused with G. epiphaea but this latter species has a metallic apical mark on the forewing which is lacking in G. helioctypa specimens.

== Distribution ==
This species is endemic to New Zealand. This species can be found throughout in the South Island with Hudson saying he came across it frequently in the grassy flats in the Routeburn Valley, beyond the head of Lake Wakatipu.

== Habitat and hosts ==
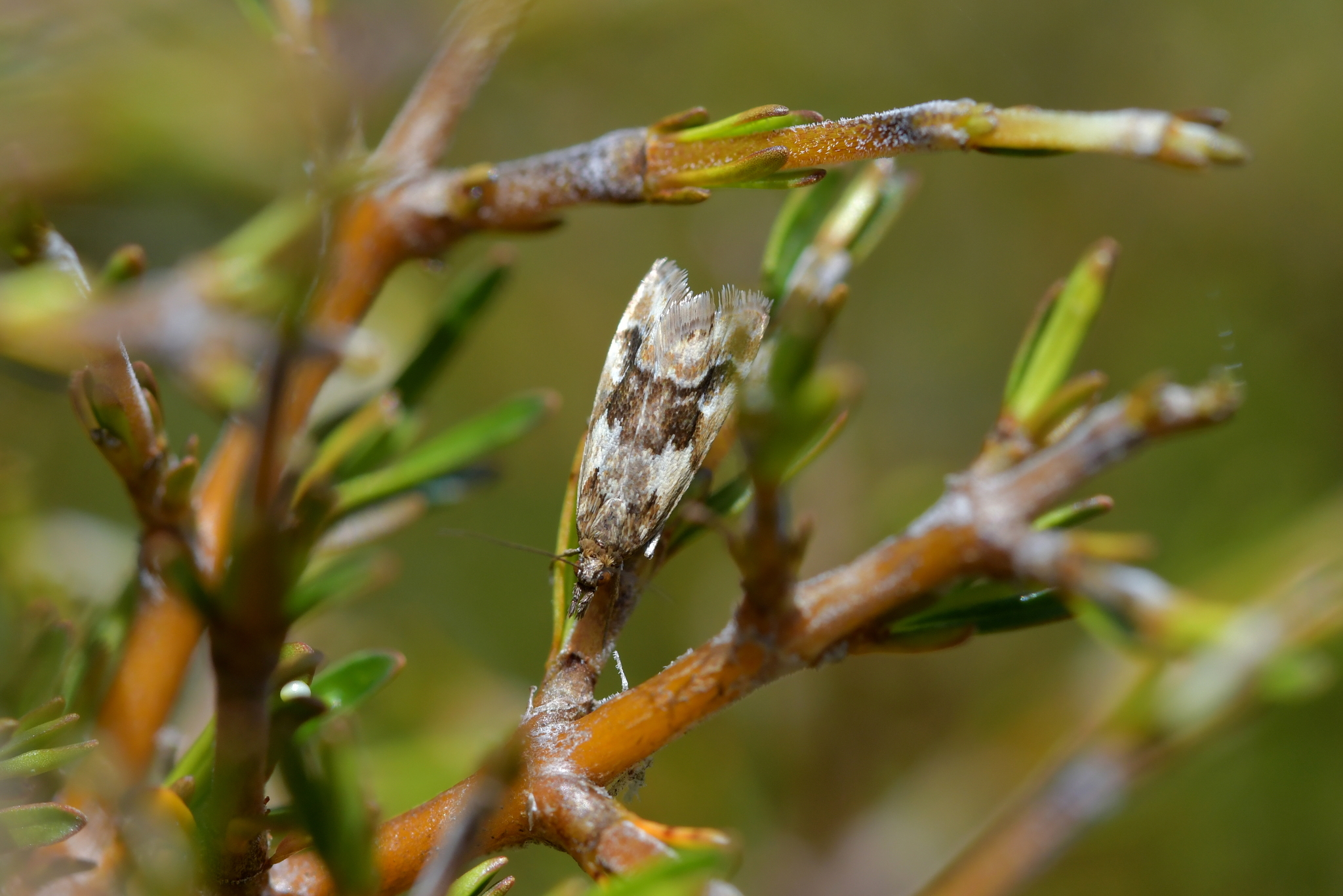
Live specimen of G. helioctypa.

G. helioctypa inhabits native forest in lowland to subalpine altitudes. It has an affinity for damp grassy open situations near native forest or scrub. Larvae of Glaucocharis species feed on mosses and liverworts.

== Behaviour ==
Adults are on the wing from November until February. It is day flying and has been observed flying low over cushion bogs and moss fields. Adults have been observed flying actively in the hottest sunshine.
