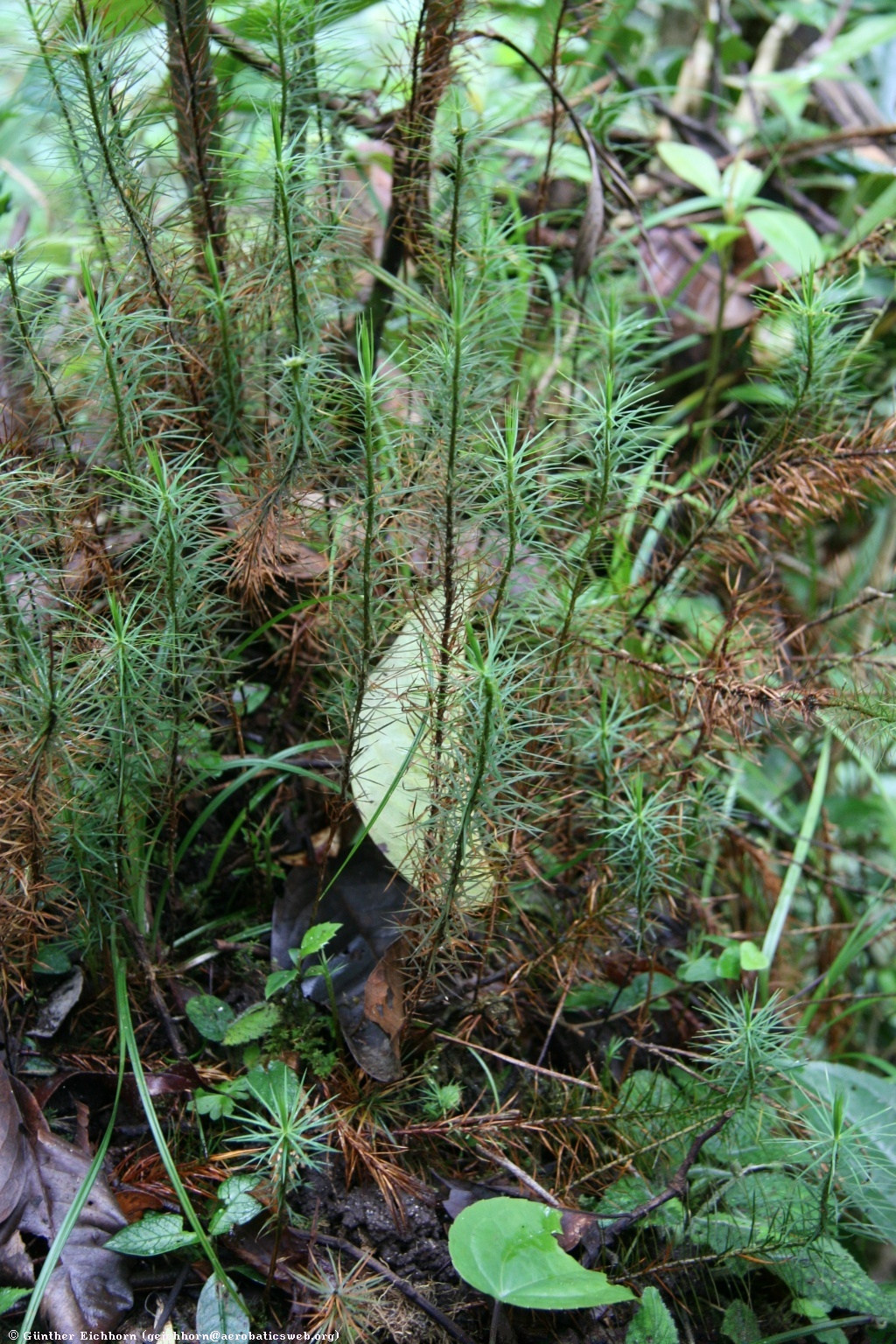
- Dawsonia longifolia at Mount Kinabalu, Borneo, Malaysia

Scientific classification
- Kingdom: Plantae
- Division: Bryophyta
- Class: Polytrichopsida
- Order: Polytrichales
- Family: Polytrichaceae
- Genus: Dawsonia
- Species: D. longifolia

Binomial name
- Dawsonia longifolia (Bruch & Schimp.) Zanten

= Dawsonia longifolia =

Species of moss

Dawsonia longifolia is a tall moss, growing to ~60 cm in height. This species may be a synonym of D. superba.

== Distribution ==
Dawsonia longifolia may be found in the Philippines, Indonesia, Malaysia, and Australia.
