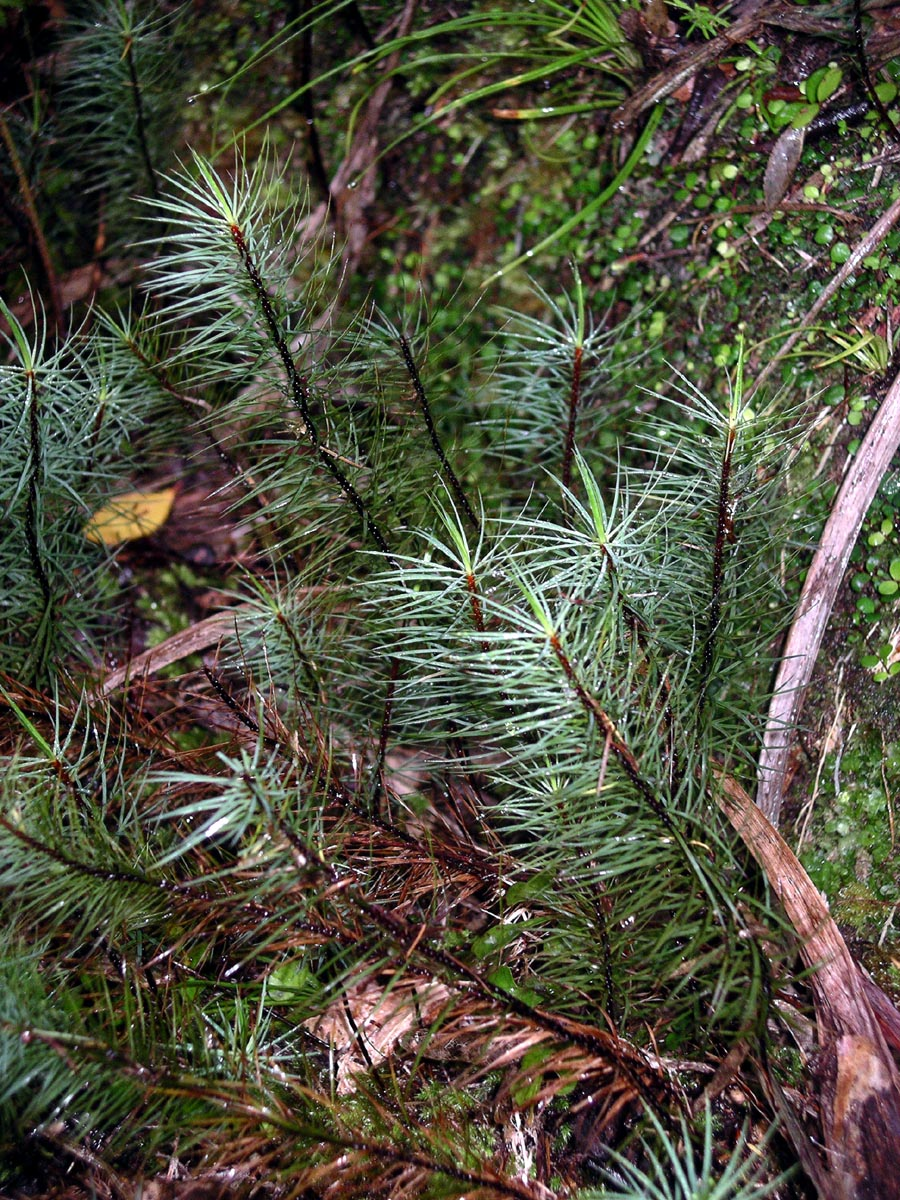
- Dawsonia superba in Abel Tasman National Park, New Zealand

Scientific classification
- Kingdom: Plantae
- Division: Bryophyta
- Class: Polytrichopsida
- Order: Polytrichales
- Family: Polytrichaceae
- Genus: Dawsonia; R.Br., 1811

Species
- D. polytrichoides R.Br., 1811 (type) synonym Triplocoma polytrichoides; D. longiseta Hampe, 1860 synonyms D. adpressa, D. longisetacea, D. victoriae; D. superba Grev., 1847 synonyms D. pulchra, D. intermedia, D. longifolia, Polytrichum longifolium

= Dawsonia (plant) =

Genus of plants, specifically moss

Dawsonia is a genus of acrocarpous mosses. Dawsonia, along with other members of the order Polytrichales, are taller than most mosses and have thicker leaves. Their sporophytes have conducting systems analogous to those of vascular plants. Dawsonia superba is found in New Zealand, Australia and New Guinea. D. longifolia is found in the Philippines, Indonesia, Malaysia, and Australia. There is uncertainty as to whether D. superba and D. longifolia are actually distinct species.

== Etymology ==
Dawsonia was named in honor of Dawson Turner (1775–1858), distinguished cryptogamist and friend of Robert Brown, who named the genus in 1811.

== Description ==
=== Height ===
Moss gametophytes lack internal transport tissues, which, coupled with the absence of cuticles, leads to the water-loss characteristic of bryophytes. As bryophytes can only grow when hydrated, the lack of conducting tissue restricts most mosses, even in relatively wet habitats, to a low stature.

However, Dawsonia (along with other genera in the Polytrichales order) reaches heights comparable to those of vascular plants. Polytrichales are acrocarpous mosses – they have vertical stems with terminal reproductive structures, with the sporophyte growing vertically (along the same axis as the gametophyte stem).

The tallest moss in the world is D. superba, which can have a stem up to 50 centimetres (20 in) tall.

=== Leaves ===
The leaves of Polytrichum and Dawsonia (and related moss) differ from those of most mosses, which are only one or two cells thick. The Polytrichaceae have lamellae – upright sheets of small, photosynthetic cells on the upper surface of the leaves with a function analogous to the mesophyll cells of vascular plant leaves. They increase the surface area of cell walls available for CO_{2} uptake, while at the same time maintaining layers of moist air between lamellae, reducing water loss. Lamella margins have a surface wax layer which prevents water from flooding into the interlamellar spaces.

=== Stems ===
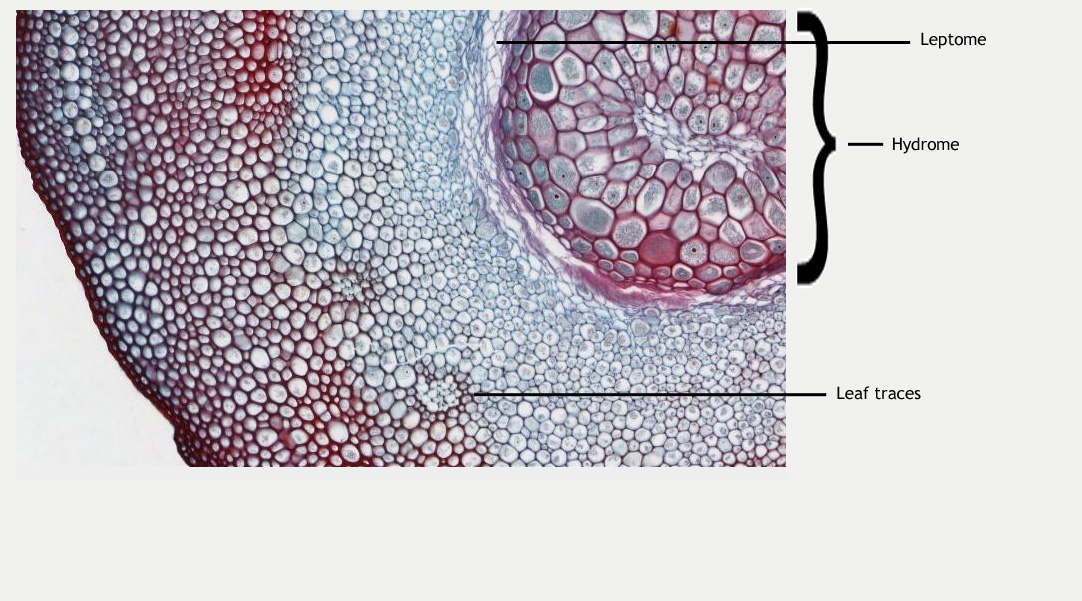
Section of a Dawsonia stem. The cylinder of hydrome can be seen in the centre, and a ring of leaf traces can be seen outside the cylinder

The stems of Polytrichales have conducting systems which are analogous to the xylem and phloem of vascular plants. The water-conducting tissue is the hydrome, made up of elongated cells known as hydroids. Unlike the xylem of vascular plants, there is no secondary thickening of cell walls, as bryophytes lack lignin. The phloem analogue in Polytrichales is the leptome, made up of leptoids, they are similar to sieve cells. Hydrome and leptome are well-developed in Polytrichales, and also appear in a number of other bryophytes.
