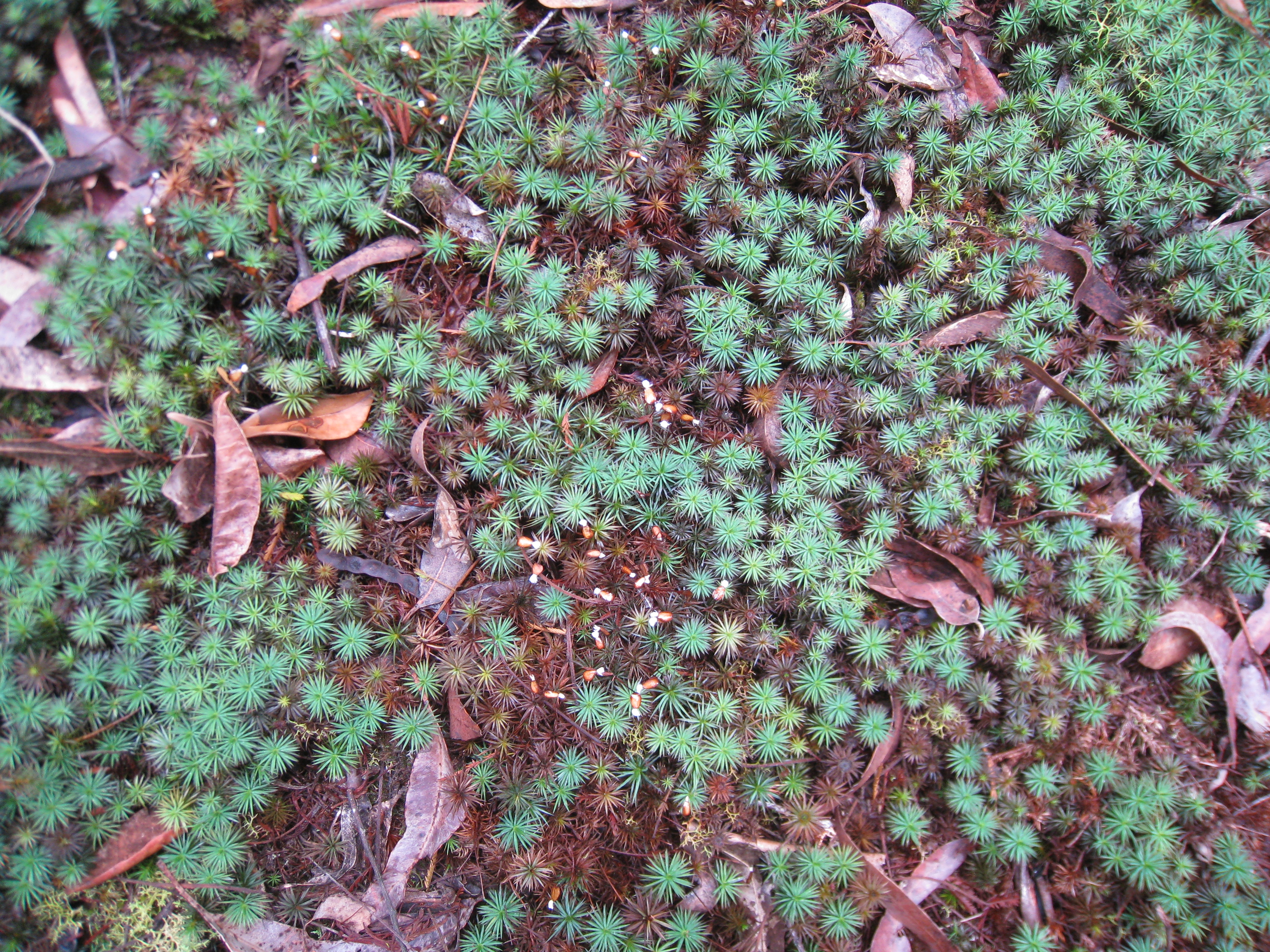

Scientific classification
- Kingdom: Plantae
- Division: Bryophyta
- Class: Polytrichopsida
- Order: Polytrichales
- Family: Polytrichaceae
- Genus: Dawsonia
- Species: D. polytrichoides

Binomial name
- Dawsonia polytrichoides R.Br., 1811

= Dawsonia polytrichoides =

Species of moss

Dawsonia polytrichoides is a species of moss found in Australia. The stem is up to 20cm long, the calyptra is very large.
