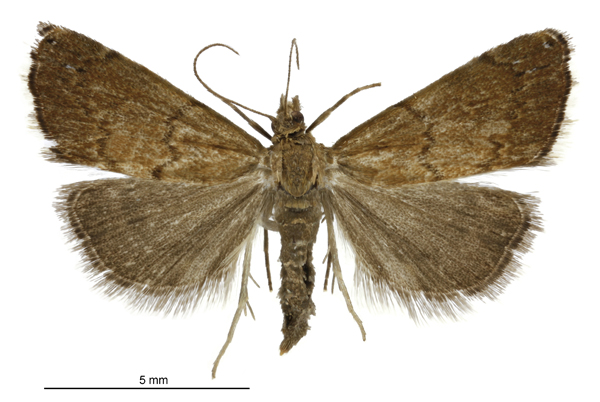
- Female

Scientific classification
- Kingdom: Animalia
- Phylum: Arthropoda
- Clade: Pancrustacea
- Class: Insecta
- Order: Lepidoptera
- Family: Crambidae
- Subfamily: Crambinae
- Tribe: Diptychophorini
- Genus: Glaucocharis
- Species: G. epiphaea

Binomial name
- Glaucocharis epiphaea (Meyrick, 1885)

Synonyms
- Diptychophora epiphaea Meyrick, 1885; Pareromene epiphaea (Meyrick, 1885)

= Glaucocharis epiphaea =

Species of moth

Glaucocharis epiphaea is a species of moth in the family Crambidae. It was described by Edward Meyrick in 1885. It is endemic to New Zealand and has been observed in both the North and South Islands. G. epiphaea prefers mountainous habitat and frequents very damp spots including alpine and subalpine moss bogs. Larvae feed on the moss Dawsonia superba. Adults are on the wing from September until March and are diurnal.

== Taxonomy ==
This species was first described by Edward Meyrick in 1885 using specimens collected at Arthur's Pass in January and named Diptychophora epiphaea. George Hudson discussed and illustrated this species under that name in his 1928 book The butterflies and moths of New Zealand. In 1929 Alfred Philpott studied the male genitalia of this species. In 1971 David Gaskin placed this species in the genus Pareromene. In 1985 Gaskin again discussed this species and placed it in the genus Glaucocharis. The male lectotype is held at the Natural History Museum, London.

== Description ==
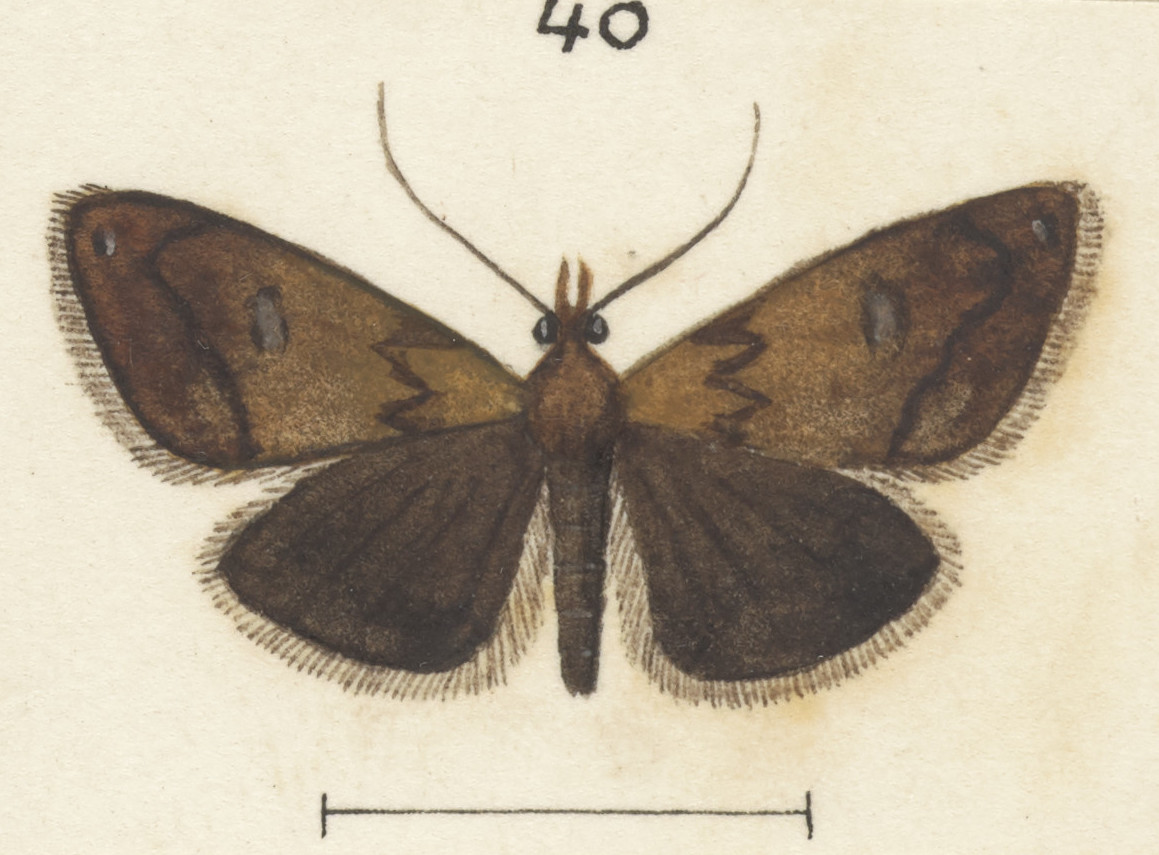
Illustration by G. Hudson

Meyrick described this species as follows:

Male, female. — 12-14 mm. Head, palpi, antennae, thorax, abdomen, and legs fuscous. Forewings broad, triangular, costa hardly arched, apex rounded, hindmargin oblique, slightly rounded, once indented below apex; fuscous, with green reflections; lines slender, irregularly denticulate, dark fuscous; first line from beyond 1/3 of costa to before middle of inner margin, angulated above middle and bent inwards below middle; discal spot obsolete or represented by a faint darker suffusion; second line from 3/4 of costa to 3/4 of inner margin, angulated above middle, thence tolerably straight; sometimes two or three whitish longitudinal streaks towards hindmargin above middle; a small black apical spot : cilia whitish, with a shining dark grey basal and lighter median line. Hindwings grey or dark grey, with greenish reflections; cilia light grey, with a dark grey basal line.

Meyrick stated that G. epiphaea can be distinguished from the similar in appearance species G. bipunctella as G. epiphaea has less distinct markings and no white discal spot.

== Distribution ==
This species is endemic to New Zealand and is found in both the North and South Islands.

== Habitat and hosts ==
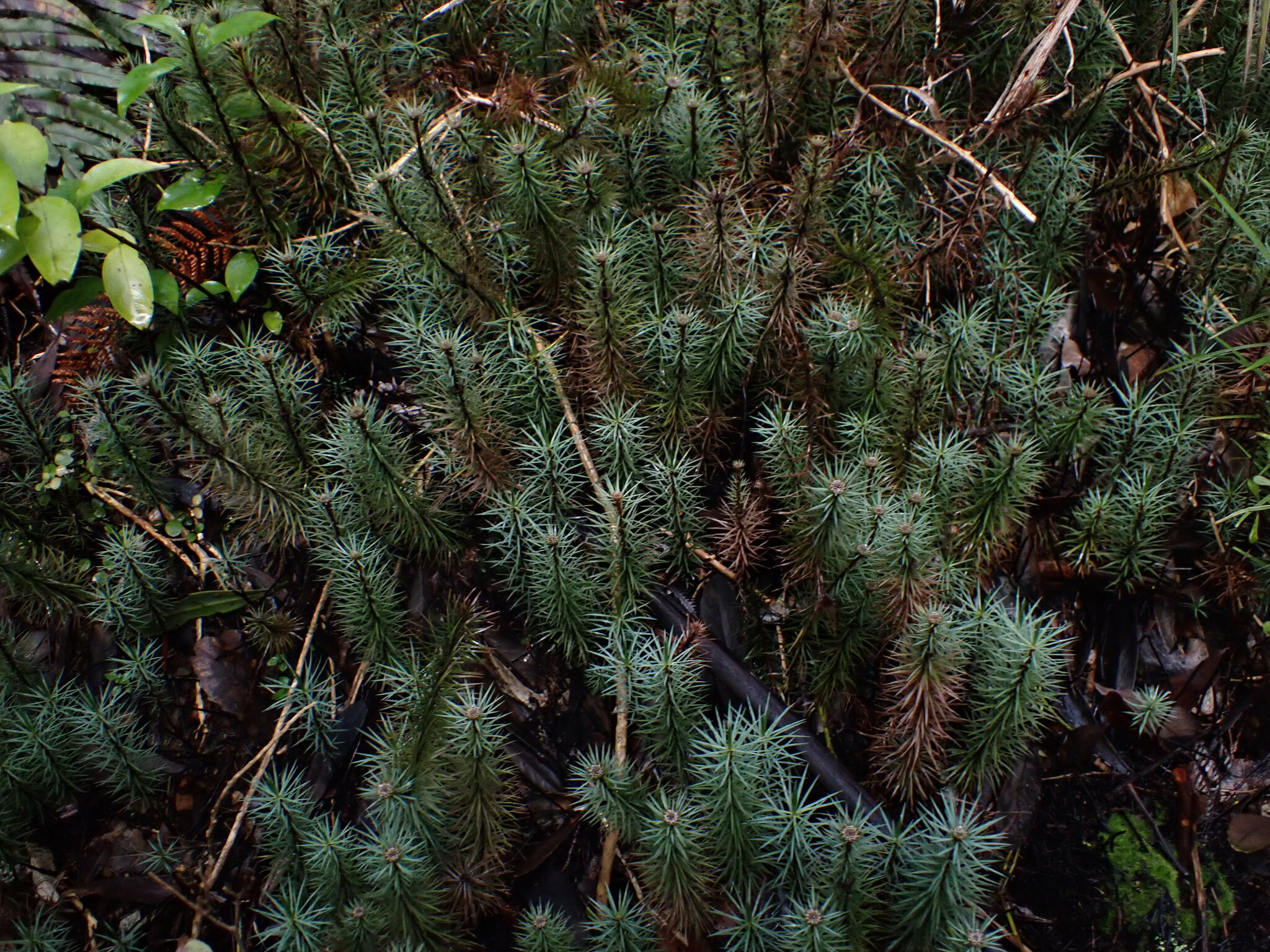
Larval host Dawsonia superba.

This species prefers mountainous habitat and can be found near or just above the upper limit of native forest and frequents very damp spots. It has been observed at the North Island central plateau and also in South island alpine and subalpine moss bogs. Larvae of G. epiphaea feed on the moss Dawsonia superba. As D. superba does not occur above the tree line in the mountains it has been hypothesised that the larvae of G. epiphaea does not exclusively feed on D. superba but has other hosts. Larvae have also been raised to maturity using Polytrichadelphus magellanicus as a supplementary food source.

== Behaviour ==
Larvae feed from silk refuge tunnels covered in leaf fragments and frass. The adult moths are day flying and are on the wing from September until March.
