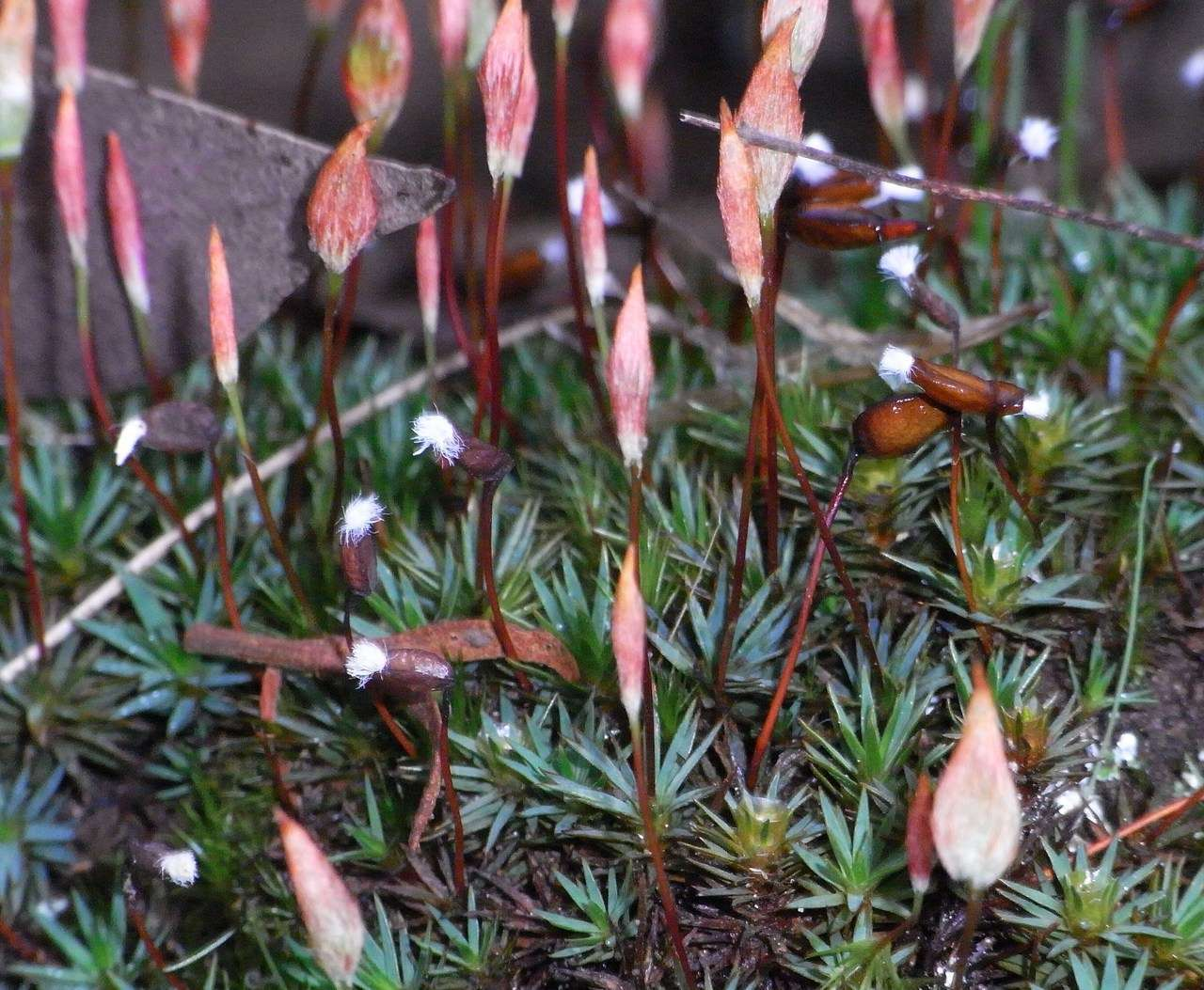
- Dawsonia longiseta with mature and immature capsules visible

Scientific classification
- Kingdom: Plantae
- Division: Bryophyta
- Class: Polytrichopsida
- Order: Polytrichales
- Family: Polytrichaceae
- Genus: Dawsonia
- Species: D. longiseta

Binomial name
- Dawsonia longiseta Hampe

Synonyms
- Dawsonia longisetacea F.Muell; Dawsonia appressa Hampe; Dawsonia victoriae Müll.Hal

= Dawsonia longiseta =

Species of moss

Dawsonia longiseta is a species of moss in the family Polytrichaceae endemic to eastern Australia.

== Distribution and habitat ==
Dawsonia longiseta can be found in south-eastern South Australia, eastern Queensland, New South Wales, Australian Capital Territory, and Victoria. It grows in shaded situations on clay, sandy, or rocky soil across a range of habitats including river banks, roadsides, gullies, and sclerophyll forests. It can be found from sea level up to 1000 metres.

== Description ==
Dawsonia longiseta is an erect moss with bluish green leaves that grows in open colonies or as scattered individuals reaching 1–3 cm (0.39–1.18 in) tall. The leaves are stiff and pointed, measuring approximately 5–7 mm (0.20–0.28 in) long, with a broad nerve and slightly serrated edge. In dry conditions, the leaves turn brown and rest alongside the stem pointing upwards. When in the sporophyte stage, plants produce capsules on stalks that grow to 2–4 cm (0.79–1.57 in) tall. Developing capsules are covered by hairy, pinkish calyptrae, while mature capsules are small and dark, sometimes with the white hairs of the peristome visible.
