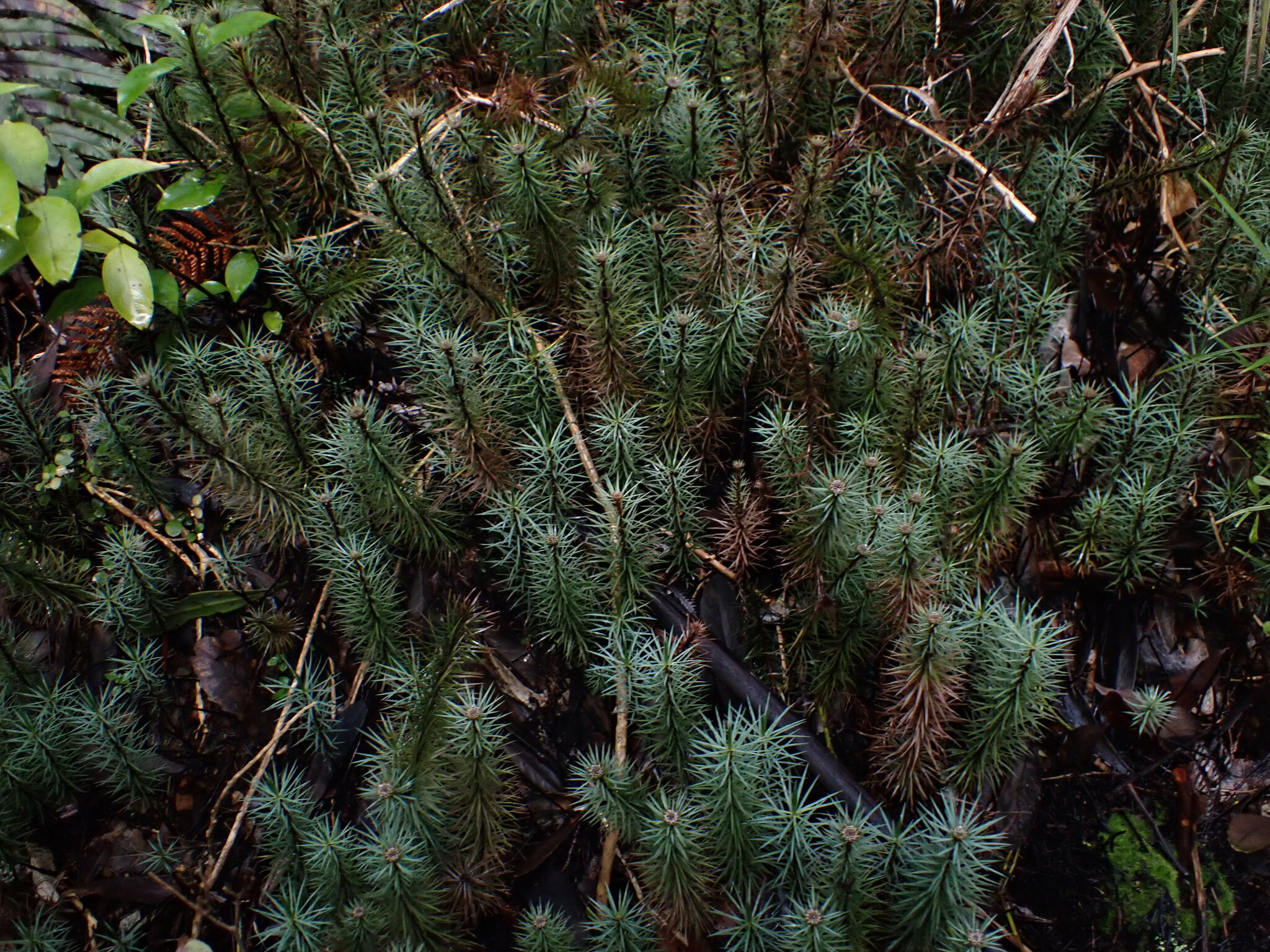
- In Coromandel Forest Park

Scientific classification
- Kingdom: Plantae
- Division: Bryophyta
- Class: Polytrichopsida
- Order: Polytrichales
- Family: Polytrichaceae
- Genus: Dawsonia
- Species: D. superba

Binomial name
- Dawsonia superba Grev., 1847

Synonyms
- Dawsonia celebensis Wijk; Dawsonia longifolia var. superba (Grev.) Zanten

= Dawsonia superba =

Species of moss

Dawsonia superba is a moss in the family Polytrichaceae that is found in Australia, New Guinea, Malaysia, and New Zealand. D. superba is the tallest self-supporting moss in the world, reaching heights of 60 cm (24 in). It has analogous structures to those in vascular plants that support large size, including hydroid and leptoid cells to conduct water and photosynthate, and lamellae that provide gas chambers for more efficient photosynthesis. D. superba is a member of the class Polytrichopsida, although it has a sporophyte that is unique from other hair-cap mosses.

There is some confusion surrounding if Dawsonia superba and Dawsonia longifolia are distinct species or refer to the same moss. According to some sources, Dawsonia longifolia and Dawsonia superba have been merged. For a long time, both D. longifolia and D. superba were used to refer to the same species, with some regional variation in its use. Both terms are still used.

== Distribution and habitat ==
The species is commonly found in Australia, New Guinea, Malaysia and New Zealand. D. superba prefers moist and sub-exposed habitats, cloud forests, and shady forests. It has often been observed growing at the base of uprooted trees.

== Gametophyte ==
Like all bryophytes, D. superba has a dominant gametophyte stage. The gametophyte is the haploid stage of the life cycle, and is composed of leaves, a stem, and root-like rhizoids. These rhizoids extend farther underground than is typical of other mosses.

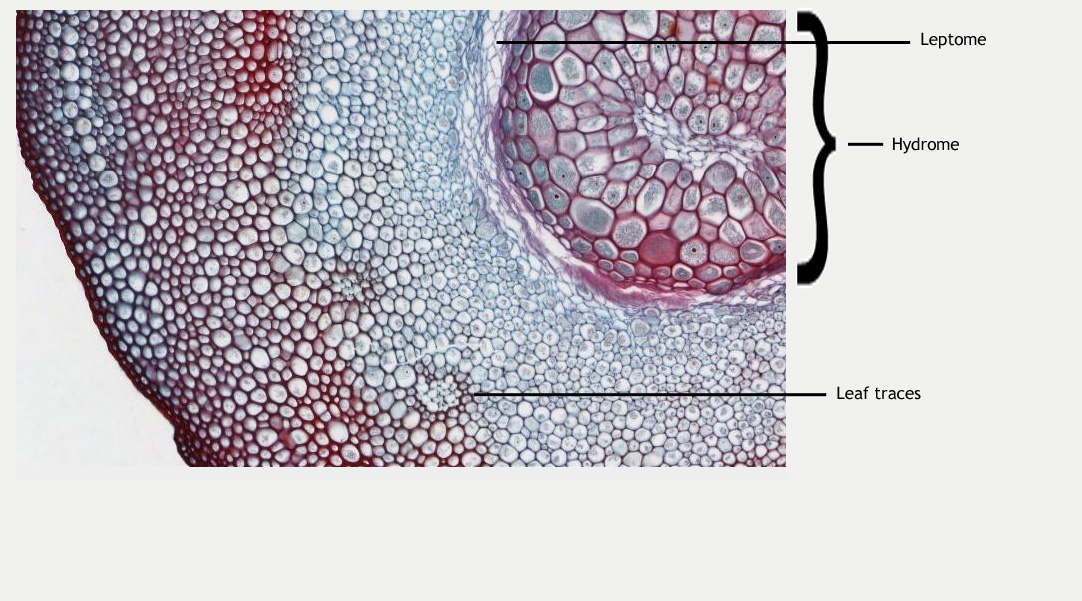
A cross section of Dawsonia superba stem. A central conducting hydrome is visible, as well as leptome cells and leaf traces.

The stem of the D. superba gametophyte has a central conducting strand and leaf traces. The stem has hydroid cells that conduct water, and leptoid cells that conduct photosynthate. According to Zanten (1973), the stem of D. superba is also characterized by the presence of sclerenchyma, which are cells with lignin in their cell walls. However, chemical analyses have shown that D. superba does not contain lignin, although it may contain a lignin-like component.

The leaves of D. superba can be up to 30 mm (1.2 in) long. Like other polytrichid mosses, the leaves of D. superba have lamellae. Lamellae are made up of rows of lamella that are one cell thick and several cells high. These rows of lamella sit atop the leaf's midrib, or costa. Each cell contains many chloroplasts. Lamellae increase the available surface area of the leaf for photosynthesis, and air spaces between each lamella allow for gas exchange to make photosynthesis more efficient. Lamellae have been referred to as "pseudo-mesophyll", meaning that they are analogous to mesophyll structures in vascular plant leaves, which also aid in gas exchange. Lamellae enable mosses to tolerate higher light saturation, which allows them to photosynthesize efficiently even in bright light, unlike other mosses with a unistratose leaf.

A waxy cuticle covers the leaf and the top of the lamellae. The wax acts as a hydrophobic barrier, so that air spaces in the lamellae are protected from both drying out and over-saturation from rainwater.

== Sporophyte ==
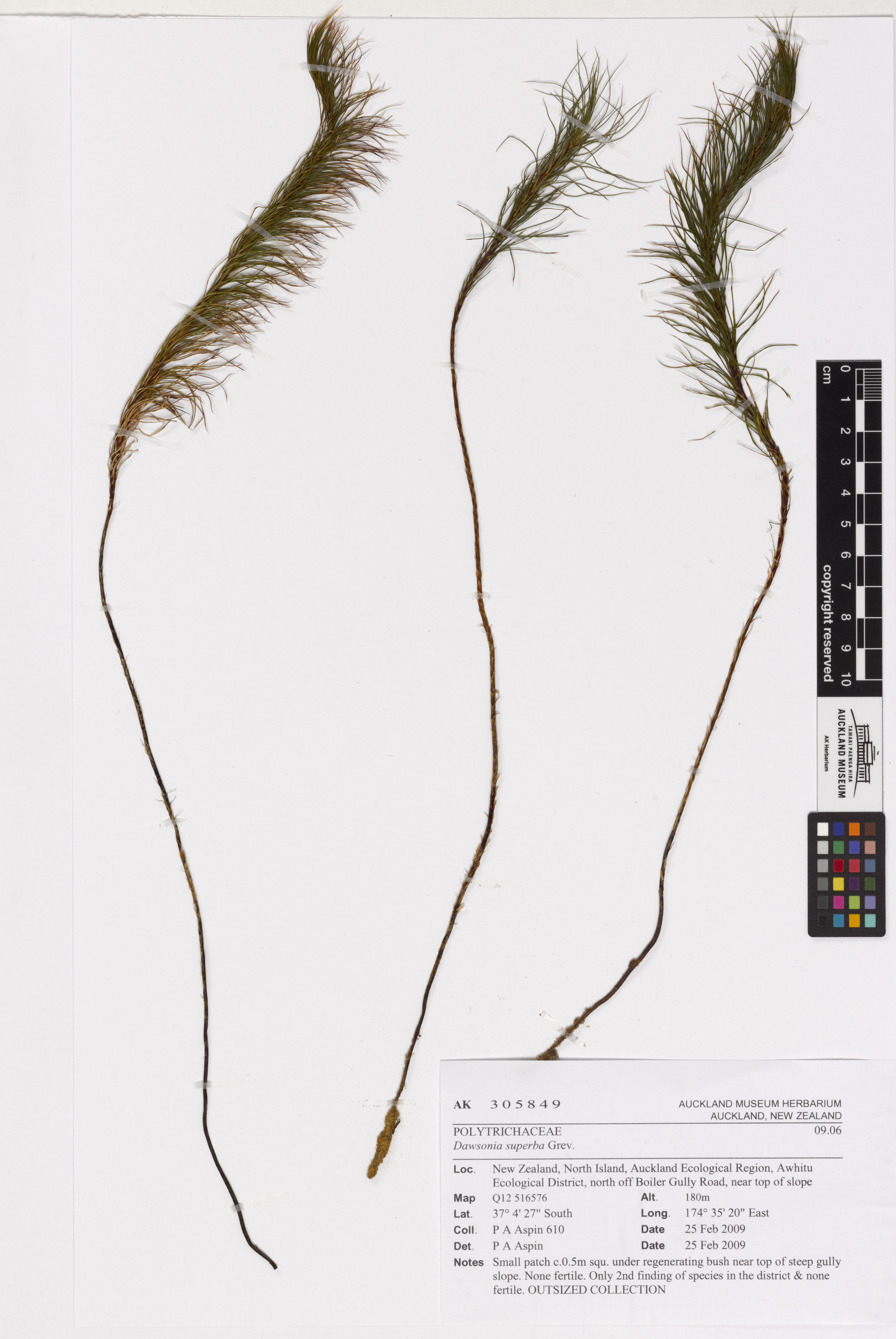
Dried vegetative samples of Dawsonia superba gametophytes

The diploid sporophyte of D. superba is produced from gametophytic tissue and depends on the gametophyte for water and nutrients. A long seta extends the sporangium above the gametophyte. The sporangium is the site of meiosis, and haploid spores are released from the sporangium through the peristome teeth. As in all members of the class Polytrichopsida, D. superba has nematodontous peristome teeth. This means that the peristome teeth are made up of whole cells. However, members of the genus Dawsonia have unique bristle-like peristome teeth. These teeth are arranged circularly in multiple rows and form a brush-like turf through which spores are released. No epiphragms are present in the Dawsoniaceae group.

The spores are dispersed over time from between these peristome teeth. Spores of D. superba are small (7 μm in diameter) and smooth. Once they have germinated, spores form protonemal shoots that develop into gametophytes.

== Reproduction ==
=== Sexual reproduction ===
The gametophytes of D. superba are dioicious, meaning that the male and female reproductive structures are housed on separate plants. The male reproductive structure, or antheridium, produces sperm that must reach a female archegonial plant in order for fertilization to occur.

While male and female plants are separate in D. superba, they often grow very close to each other. In order to disperse sperm, male gametophytes use what is called a splash-cup mechanism. Archegonia are found at the tips of gametophytic shoots. The leaves surrounding the antheridia, also called perigonial leaves, form a shallow cup-like structure. Water that falls into this cup collects sperm, and as the water splashes out of the cup the sperm is carried out with it. Using this mechanism, sperm can be dispersed up to 3 metres (9.8 ft) away from the male gametophyte.

=== Asexual reproduction ===
Leaves, when isolated from the rest of the plant, have been shown by Selkirk (1980) to develop protonemal filaments, although this regeneration is rare in D. superba compared to other members of the genus. Additionally, rhizomes often send up vegetative shoots.

== Growth and height ==
D. superba is the tallest known moss and can grow up to a height of 60 cm (24 in). Growth rates as high as 48 mm (1.9 in) per year have been observed, although the average growth rate is likely closer to 20 mm (0.79 in) per year. Temperature is the most important factor for growth, with the second most important factor being optimal water levels.

In order to grow tall, a plant must be able to conduct enough photosynthesis to have energy for growth, and have enough water to continue photosynthesis. Therefore, high photosynthetic efficiency and some sort of water transport system is necessary for plants to reach a certain height. D. superba has a hydroid system to conduct water and a leptoid system to conduct photosynthate, which allows the plant to stay hydrated internally. Surface wax on leaves also reduces desiccation. D. superba also has lamellae on its leaves. Lamellae increase photosynthetic surface area and provide spaces for gas exchange, both of which increase photosynthetic efficiency. These traits combined allow D. superba to grow taller than other mosses.
