= Dichaetomyia longiseta =

Scientific classification
- Kingdom: Animalia
- Phylum: Arthropoda
- Clade: Pancrustacea
- Class: Insecta
- Order: Diptera
- Family: Muscidae
- Genus: Dichaetomyia
- Species: D. longiseta

Binomial name
- Dichaetomyia longiseta Pont, 1967

Species of fly

Dichaetomyia longiseta is a species of fly in the family Muscidae that is native to Australia. Described in 1967 by Adrian Charles Pont, it is an uncommon species known from the rainforests and wet sclerophyll forests of New South Wales, Queensland, and the Northern Territory.
